= Limoza Island =

Island in Graham Land, Antarctica

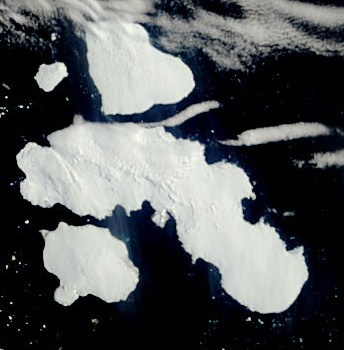
- D'Urville, Joinville and Dundee Islands (top to bottom)

- Location within Antarctica Location within Antarctic Peninsula

Geography
- Location: Antarctica
- Coordinates: 62°59′40.6″S 56°16′27″W
- Archipelago: Joinville Island group
- Length: 470 m (1540 ft)
- Width: 230 m (750 ft)

Administration
- Antarctica
- Administered under the Antarctic Treaty System

Demographics
- Population: uninhabited

Limoza Island (Bulgarian: остров Лимоза, romanized: ostrov Limoza, IPA: [ˈɔstrof liˈmɔzɐ]) is the rocky island off D'Urville Island in the Joinville Island group, Antarctica extending 470 m in west–east direction and 230 m wide.

The island is “named after the ocean fishing trawler Limoza of the Bulgarian company Ocean Fisheries – Burgas whose ships operated in the waters of South Georgia, Kerguelen, the South Orkney Islands, South Shetland Islands and Antarctic Peninsula from 1970 to the early 1990s. The Bulgarian fishermen, along with those of the Soviet Union, Poland and East Germany are the pioneers of modern Antarctic fishing industry.”

== Location ==
Limoza Island is located at 62°59′40.6″S 56°16′27″W, which is 1.5 km north of the coast of D'Urville Island, 10.98 km east-southeast of Cape Juncal, 6.32 km southeast of Harris Rock, and 13.8 km west-northwest of the largest of Français Rocks. British mapping in 1973.

== Maps ==
- Joinville Island. Scale 1:250000 topographic map SP 21-22/14. Directorate of Overseas Surveys, 1973.
- Antarctic Digital Database (ADD). Scale 1:250000 topographic map of Antarctica. Scientific Committee on Antarctic Research (SCAR). Since 1993, regularly upgraded and updated.
