= Tabarin Peninsula =

Peninsula in Antarctica

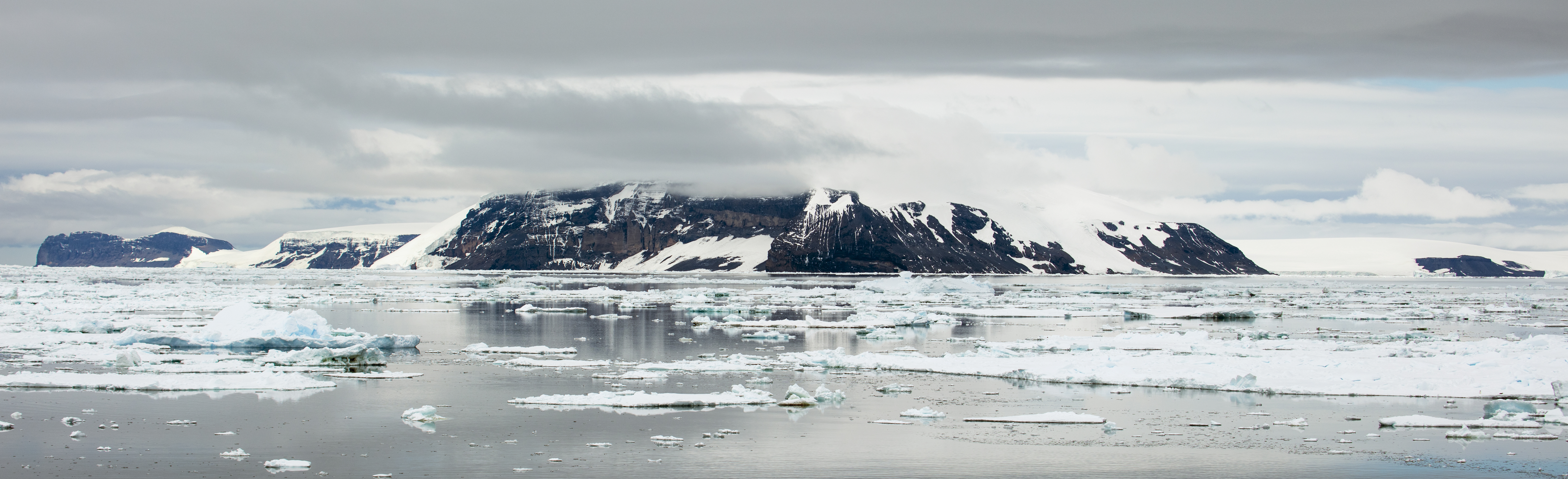
- Brown Bluff, on the east side of the peninsula

- Location within Antarctica

Geography
- Coordinates: 63°32′S 57°0′W

Administration
- Antarctica

The Tabarin Peninsula (63°32′S 57°0′W) is a peninsula 15 nautical miles (28 km; 17 mi) long and 5 to 12 nautical miles (9.3 to 22.2 km; 5.8 to 13.8 mi) wide, lying south of the trough between Hope Bay and Duse Bay and forming the east extremity of Trinity Peninsula in the Antarctic Peninsula.

== Location ==
Trinity Peninsula on Antarctic Peninsula. Tabarin Peninsula east of the tip

Tabarin Peninsula lies in Graham Land and forms the east tip of Trinity Peninsula, which is itself the tip of the Antarctic Peninsula. The peninsula extends in a southeast direction from the tip of Trinity Peninsula. It is separated by Antarctic Sound from the Joinville Island group to the east. It is northwest of the Erebus and Terror Gulf, and northeast of James Ross Island. Argentina's Esperanza Base is at the northeast end of the peninsula, beside Uruguay's ECARE base, named for Ruperto Elichiribehety.

The Tabarin Peninsula extends southwards into the Weddell Sea for about 25 kilometres (16 mi). It is connected to the mainland by an isthmus about 12 kilometres (7.5 mi) wide which lies between Hope Bay to the north and Duse Bay to the south. The average height of the peninsular is about 250 m (820 ft) and the highest point, at around 1,000 metres (3,300 ft), is Mount Taylor which lies just north of the isthmus.

== Discovery and name ==
The Tabarin Peninsula was discovered and charted by the Swedish Antarctic Expedition (SwedAE), 1901–1904, led by Otto Nordenskjöld and Carl Anton Larsen. It was mapped in 1946 by the Falkland Islands Dependencies Survey (FIDS) and named after Operation Tabarin, the naval code name for the FIDS from 1943 to 1945.

== Geology ==
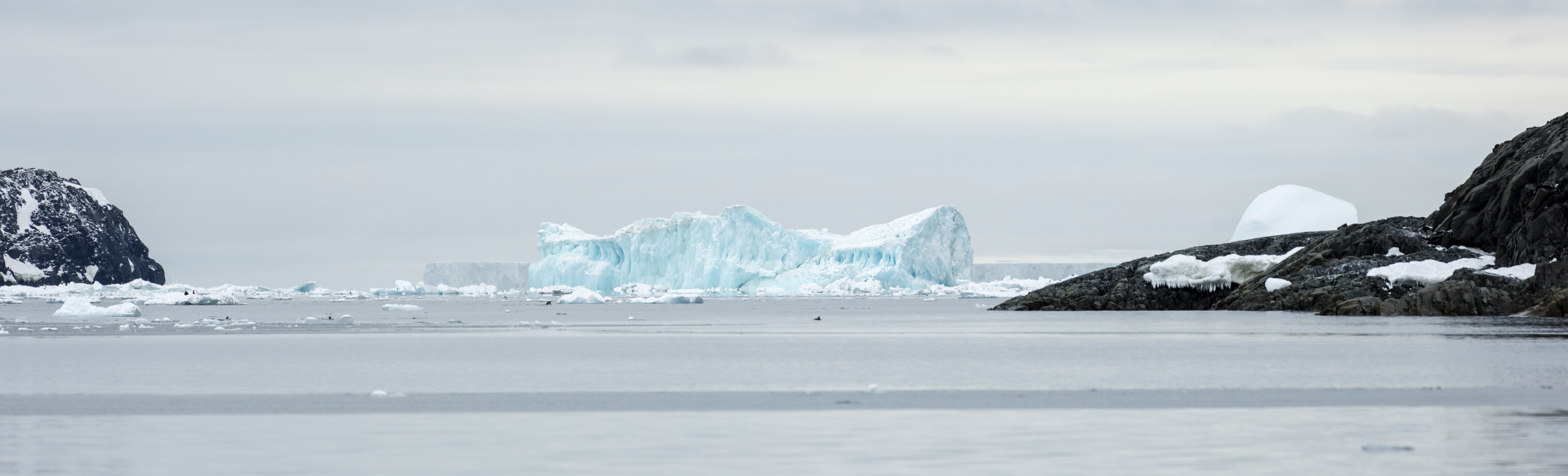
Icebergs in Hope Bay, northern side of the peninsula

Recently, more of the ground surface of the peninsula has become exposed by the melting of ice, and its geological structure is becoming clearer. Near Trepassey Bay there is a 60 m (200 ft) bed of steeply-dipping quartz-rich sandstones and mudstones which are probably part of the Hope Bay Formation dating to the Permian-Triassic. Dioritic rocks in this area are probably part of the early Cretaceous Antarctic Peninsula batholith. Rocks exposed above Duse Bay are Mesozoic marine sediments dipping gently to the southeast, and consisting of 60% coarse-grained conglomerates, 30% mudstones and 10% sandstones.

== Flora and fauna ==
The crumbling cliffs of Brown Bluff tower over Trepassey Bay, causing rock falls and scree slopes, and some wind-eroded boulders fall to the beach below. There are a few lichens on boulders at the top of the beach and some mosses grow higher up the slope, but no vascular plants grow here. Weddell seals often haul out on the beach and leopard seals hunt offshore. This is a breeding site for gentoo and Adélie penguins, Cape petrels, snow petrels, skuas and kelp gulls. Other birds that probably breed here include the southern giant petrel, the southern fulmar and Wilson's storm petrel.

== Glaciers ==
=== Depot Glacier ===
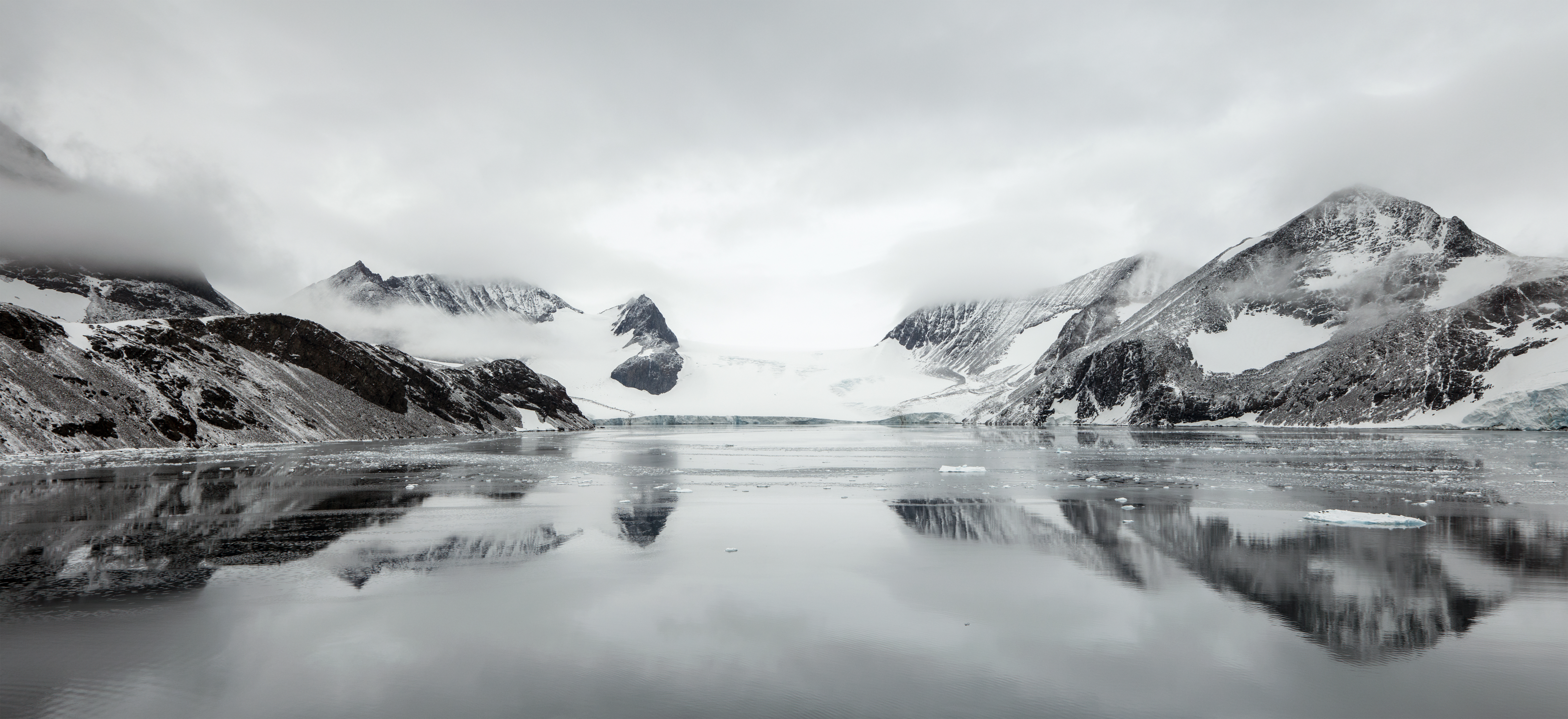
Depot Glacier, Hope Bay

63°25′S 57°03′W. A well-defined valley glacier, flanked by lateral moraines, which terminates in a high vertical ice cliff at the head of Hope Bay, in the northeast end of the Antarctic Peninsula. Discovered by the SwedAE, 1901-04, under Otto Nordenskjöld, and so named by him because, as seen from Antarctic Sound, it appeared to be a possible site for a depot.

=== Kenney Glacier ===
63°25′S 57°02′W. A glacier 1 nautical mile (1.9 km; 1.2 mi) long flowing northwest from The Pyramid and The Saddlestone into Depot Glacier, near the head of Hope Bay. Mapped in 1945 and 1948 by the FIDS. Resurveyed by the Falkland Islands Dependencies Survey (FIDS) in 1955 and named for Richard R. Kenney, assistant surveyor at Hope Bay in 1954 and 1955, who made a detailed local survey of the area between Hope and Duse Bays.

== Coastal features ==
Coastal features, clockwise from the northeast, include:

=== Hope Bay ===
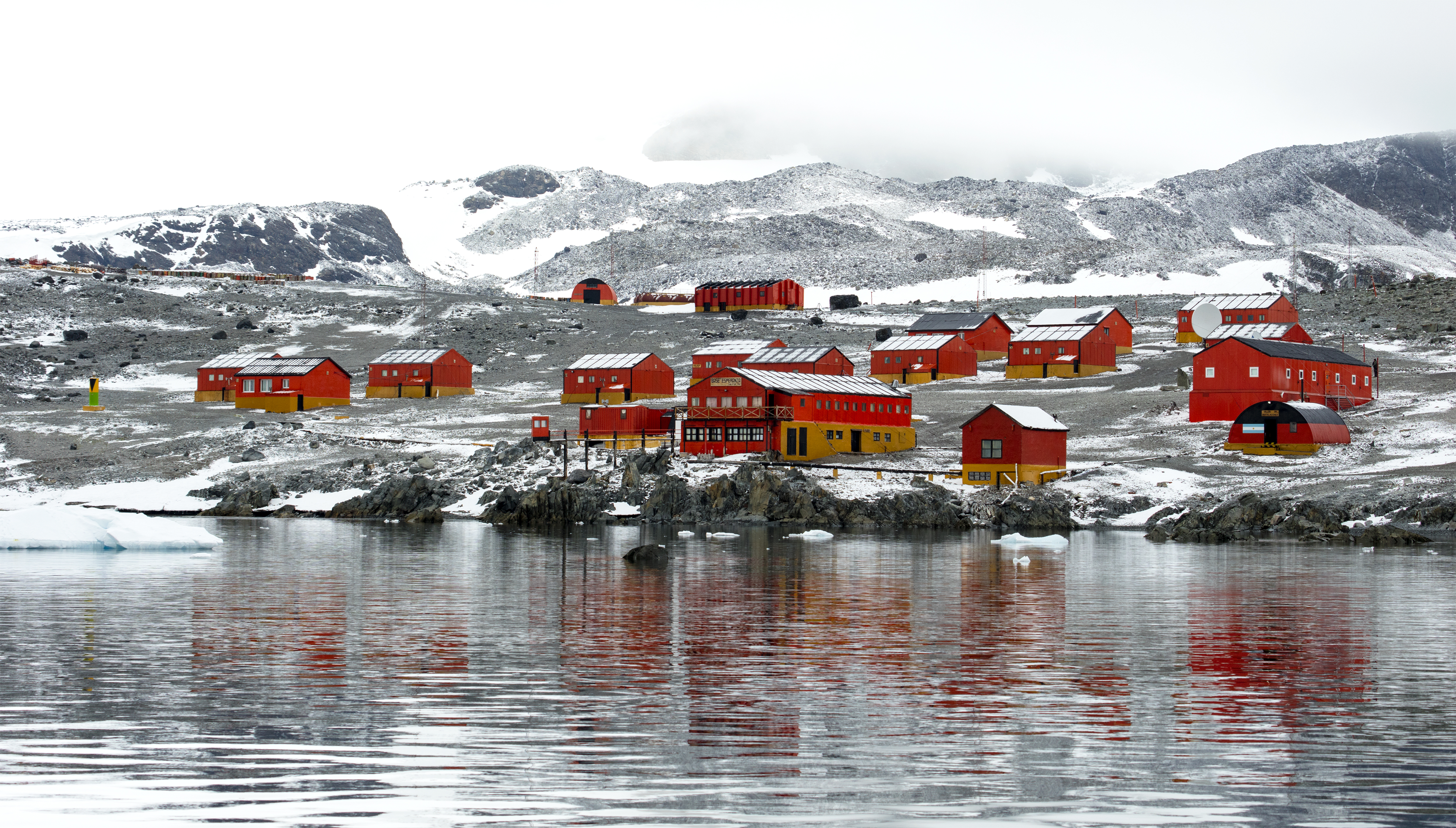
Esperanza Base, Hope Bay, January, 2016

63°23′S 57°00′W. A bay 3 nautical miles (5.6 km; 3.5 mi) long and 2 nautical miles (3.7 km; 2.3 mi) wide, indenting the tip of Antarctic Peninsula and opening on Antarctic Sound. Discovered on January 15, 1902, by the SwedAE under Otto Nordenskjöld, who named it in commemoration of the winter spent there by J. Gunnar Andersson, S.A. Duse, and Toralf Grunden of his expedition.

=== Trepassey Bay ===
63°28′S 56°58′W. A bay 0.8 nautical miles (1.5 km; 0.92 mi) wide, lying on the east side of Tabarin Peninsula 3.5 nautical miles (6.5 km; 4.0 mi) southeast of Hope Bay. First surveyed by the FIDS and by E. Burden, Master of the Trepassey, from that vessel in 1947. Resurveyed in 1955 by the FIDS. Named by the UK Antarctic Place-Names Committee (UK-APC) for the Trepassey, which was chartered by the FIDS in 1945-46 and 1946-47. The vessel was used for the relief of the station at Hope Bay in both seasons and for a survey of Antarctic Sound during the second one.

=== Fridtjof Sound ===
63°34′S 56°43′W. A sound, 6 nautical miles (11 km; 6.9 mi) long in a north–south direction and 2 nautical miles (3.7 km; 2.3 mi) wide, which separates Andersson Island and Jonassen Island from the Tabarin Peninsula. Discovered by the SwedAE, 1901-04, under Otto Nordenskjöld, and named after the Fridtjof, a vessel dispatched from Sweden to search for the SwedAE when it was feared lost in 1903.

=== Cape Green ===
63°40′S 56°50′W. Low ice cliff forming the southeast extremity of Tabarin Peninsula. Charted by the FIDS in 1946 and named for Michael C. Green, FIDS geologist who lost his life when the base hut at Hope Bay burned in November 1948.

=== Cape Burd ===
63°39′S 57°09′W. Low rock cliff forming the southwest extremity of Tabarin Peninsula. Charted by the FIDS in 1946 and named for Oliver Burd, FIDS meteorologist who lost his life when the base hut at Hope Bay burned in November 1948.

=== Seven Buttresses ===
63°36′S 57°10′W. A series of seven rock buttresses, 150 metres (490 ft) high, which are separated by narrow icefalls and extend for 4 nautical miles (7.4 km; 4.6 mi) along the west side of Tabarin Peninsula. Probably first sighted by a party under J. Gunnar Andersson of the SwedAE, 1901-04. The Seven Buttresses were surveyed and named by the FIDS, 1946.

== Peaks and passes ==
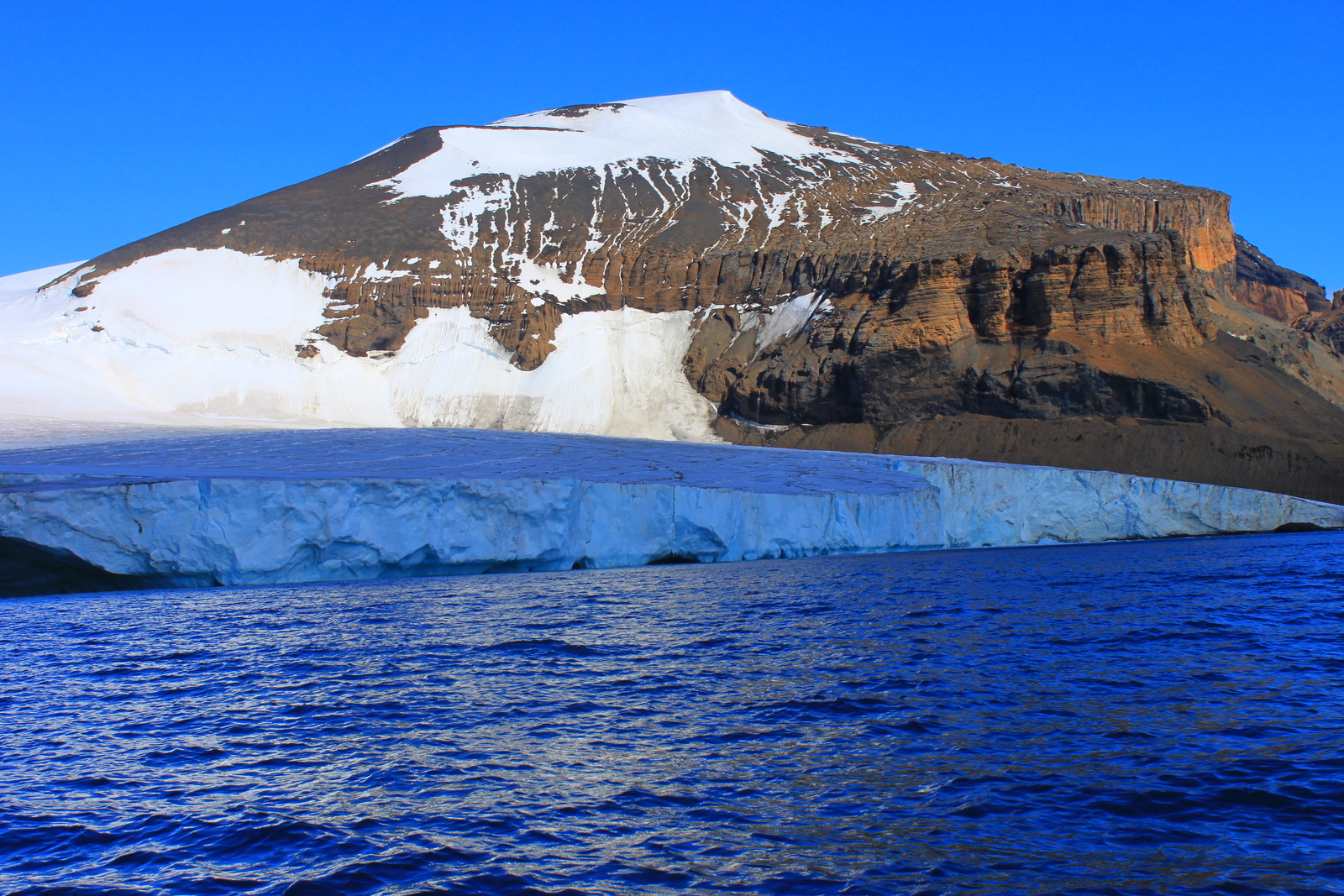
Brown Bluff as seen from Antarctic Sound

Mountain peaks, ridges and passes include, from north to south:

=== Mount Carroll ===
63°26′S 57°03′W. A horseshoe-shaped mountain rising to 650 metres (2,130 ft) high, south of Hope Bay. Discovered and mapped by the SwedAE, 1901-04. Surveyed by FIDS, 1945-47, and named in error "Mount Carrel" after Tom Carroll (b. 1864), Newfoundland boatswain of the ship Eagle, which participated in establishing the FIDS Hope Bay base in February 1945. The spelling has been amended to correct the original error.

=== The Steeple ===
63°26′S 57°03′W. A rocky ridge, about 500 metres (1,600 ft) high, forming the northwest arm of horseshoe-shaped Mount Carroll. It rises on the east side of Depot Glacier, 1.5 nautical miles (2.8 km; 1.7 mi) south of the head of Hope Bay. Discovered by the SwedAE, 1901-04, under Otto Nordenskjöld. The descriptive name was applied by the FIDS, 1945.

=== Dimaryp Peak ===
63°26′S 57°02′W. The prominent northeastern peak of Mount Carroll, rising to 500 metres (1,600 ft) high, 1 nautical mile (1.9 km; 1.2 mi) southof the head of Hope Bay. First charted by the SwedAE under Otto Nordenskjöld, 1901-04. Surveyed in 1945 and 1955 by FIDS, who applied the name. This peak is very similar to and has been frequently misidentified in bad weather as The Pyramid, a peak 0.8 mi to the east. The name is an anagram of pyramid.

=== The Saddlestone ===
63°26′S 57°02′W. A small nunatak, 380 metres (1,250 ft) high, standing between Mount Carroll and The Pyramid, in the north part of Tabarin Peninsula. It rises 45 metres (148 ft) high above the ice sheet at the head of Kenney Glacier. Surveyed in 1955 by FIDS, who applied the descriptive name; saddlestone is an architectural term for the stone at the apex of a pediment or gable.

=== The Pyramid ===
63°26′S 57°01′W. A pyramidal nunatak, 565 metres (1,854 ft) high, standing 1 nautical mile (1.9 km; 1.2 mi) east of Mount Carroll and 1.5 nautical miles (2.8 km; 1.7 mi) southeast of the head of Hope Bay. Discovered and named by a party under J. Gunnar Andersson of the SwedAE, 1901-04.

=== Summit Pass ===
63°27′S 57°02′W. A col 345 metres (1,132 ft) high between Passes Peak and Summit Ridge, situated 2.5 nautical miles (4.6 km; 2.9 mi) south of the head of Hope Bay and 3.5 nautical miles (6.5 km; 4.0 mi) northeast of Duse Bay. This area was first explored by the SwedAE, 1901-04. Summit Pass was first charted and named by the FIDS, 1945. It is the highest point on the sledge route between Hope Bay and Duse Bay.

=== Summit Ridge ===
63°27′S 57°02′W. A ridge, 380 metres (1,250 ft) high, with a steep ice slope on the north side and a rock cliff on the south side. It extends eastward from Passes Peak for 0.5 nautical miles (0.93 km; 0.58 mi) and is located 2 nautical miles (3.7 km; 2.3 mi) south of the head of Hope Bay. This area was first explored by the SwedAE, 1901-04. Summit Ridge was first charted and named by the FIDS, 1945. The feature takes its name from nearby Summit Pass.

=== Passes Peak ===
63°27′S 57°03′W. A pyramidal peak, 535 metres (1,755 ft) high, standing next south of Mount Carroll and 2 nautical miles (3.7 km; 2.3 mi) south of the head of Hope Bay. First charted in 1945 by the FIDS, and so named because it lies between two passes used by Hope Bay sledging parties in traveling to Duse Bay and to the head of Depot Glacier.

=== Last Hill ===
63°28′S 57°05′W. A small hill, 350 metres (1,150 ft) high, with a rock ridge at its crest and a cliff at its north side, standing 4 nautical miles (7.4 km; 4.6 mi) south-southwest of Hope Bay and 2 nautical miles (3.7 km; 2.3 mi) east of the northeast shore of Duse Bay on Tabarin Peninsula. Probably seen by the SwedAE, 1901-04, under Otto Nordenskjöld. First charted in 1946 by the FIDS, who so named it because it marks the last climb on the sledge route between Hope Bay and Duse Bay.

=== Fivemile Rock ===
63°29′S 57°03′W. A small nunatak, 375 metres (1,230 ft) high, rising just northwest of Mineral Hill. Mapped in 1946 and again in 1956 by the FIDS, and so named because the feature is located 5 miles from their station at Hope Bay on the route from there to Duse Bay.

=== Mineral Hill ===
63°29′S 57°03′W. A round-topped hill, 445 metres (1,460 ft) high, with ice-free, talus-covered slopes, standing 1.5 nautical miles (2.8 km; 1.7 mi) west of Trepassey Bay. Probably first seen by the SwedAE under Otto Nordenskjöld, 1901-04. First charted by the FIDS in 1946, who so named it because small quantities of reddish mineral in the rock gave the surfaces a conspicuous color.

=== Cairn Hill ===
63°30′S 57°04′W. A hill with two summits, the higher 475 metres (1,558 ft) high, standing 2 nautical miles (3.7 km; 2.3 mi) east of Duse Bay and 1 nautical mile (1.9 km; 1.2 mi) southwest of Mineral Hill. First charted by the FIDS in 1946, who so named it because a cairn was erected on the eastern of the two summits.

=== Ridge Peak ===
63°30′S 57°03′W. A pyramidal rocky peak, 510 metres (1,670 ft) high, from which a prominent ridge extends eastward, standing 2.5 nautical miles (4.6 km; 2.9 mi) southwest of Trepassey Bay between Cairn Hill and Lizard Hill. This area was first explored by a party of the SwedAE, 1901-04. Ridge Peak was charted and named by the FIDS, 1946.

=== Lizard Hill ===
63°31′S 57°01′W. A narrow, curving rock ridge, 355 metres (1,165 ft) high, standing 2 nautical miles (3.7 km; 2.3 mi) southwest of Trepassey Bay and 0.5 nautical miles (0.93 km; 0.58 mi) east of Ridge Peak. Probably first seen by the SwedAE, 1901-04, under Otto Nordenskjöld. First charted in 1946 by the FIDS, who applied the descriptive name.

=== Brown Bluff ===
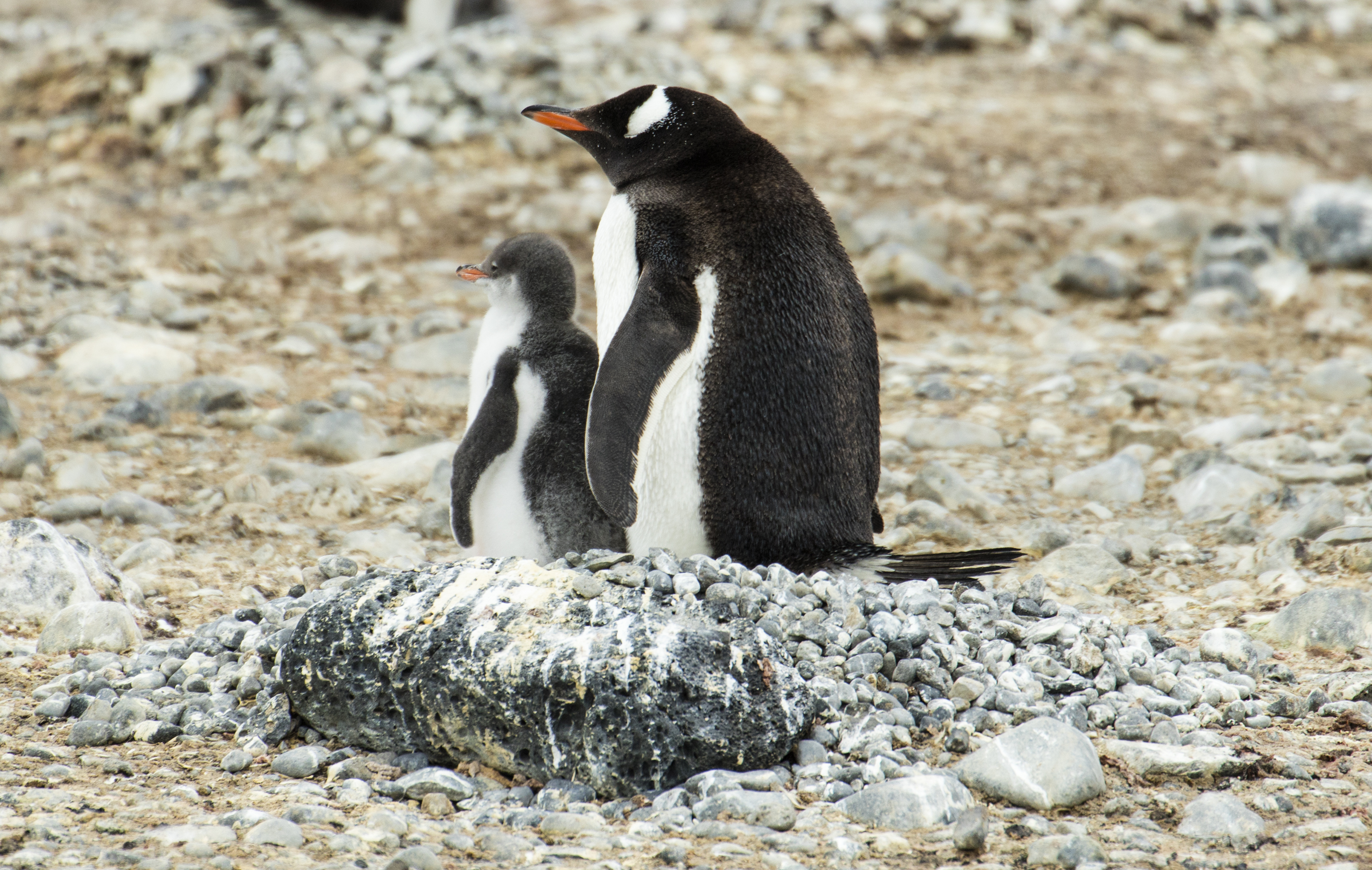
Gentoo penguins at Brown Bluff

63°32′S 56°55′W. An ice-capped, flat-topped mountain, 745 metres (2,444 ft) high, with a prominent cliff of reddish-brown volcanic rock on the north face, 9 nautical miles (17 km; 10 mi) south of Hope Bay on the east side of Tabarin Peninsula. The descriptive name was applied by the FIDS following their survey in 1946.

=== Gamma Hill ===
63°34′S 56°47′W. A distinctive ice-covered hill rising more than 300 metres (980 ft) high on the shore of Fridtjof Sound. The name arises from the intensive geophysical work carried out in this part of Tabarin Peninsula by FIDS in 1959-60.

=== Buttress Hill ===
63°34′S 57°03′W. A flat-topped hill, 690 metres (2,260 ft) high, with steep rock cliffs on the west side, standing 2 nautical miles (3.7 km; 2.3 mi) east of the most northern of the Seven Buttresses. Charted in 1946 by the FIDS and so named because of its proximity to the Seven Buttresses.

=== Cone Nunatak ===
63°36′S 57°02′W. A nunatak, 350 metres (1,150 ft) high, which appears conical on its north side but has brown rock cliffs on its south face, lying 3 nautical miles (5.6 km; 3.5 mi) south-southeast of Buttress Hill. The descriptive name was applied by the FIDS following their survey of the area in 1946.

== Sources ==
- Alberts, Fred G., ed. (1995), Geographic Names of the Antarctic (PDF) (2 ed.), United States Board on Geographic Names This article incorporates public domain material from websites or documents of the United States Board on Geographic Names.
- "Brown Bluff" (PDF), Visitor Guidelines, ATS: Antarctic Treaty Secretariat
- Del Valle, R.A. (2001), "Geology of new localities on Tabarin Peninsula, northern Antarctic Peninsula", Antarctic Science, 13 (3): 323–328, doi:10.1017/s0954102001000451
- Graham Land and South Shetland Islands, BAS: British Antarctic Survey, 2005

This article incorporates public domain material from websites or documents of the United States Geological Survey.
