= Andersson Island =

Island in Antarctica

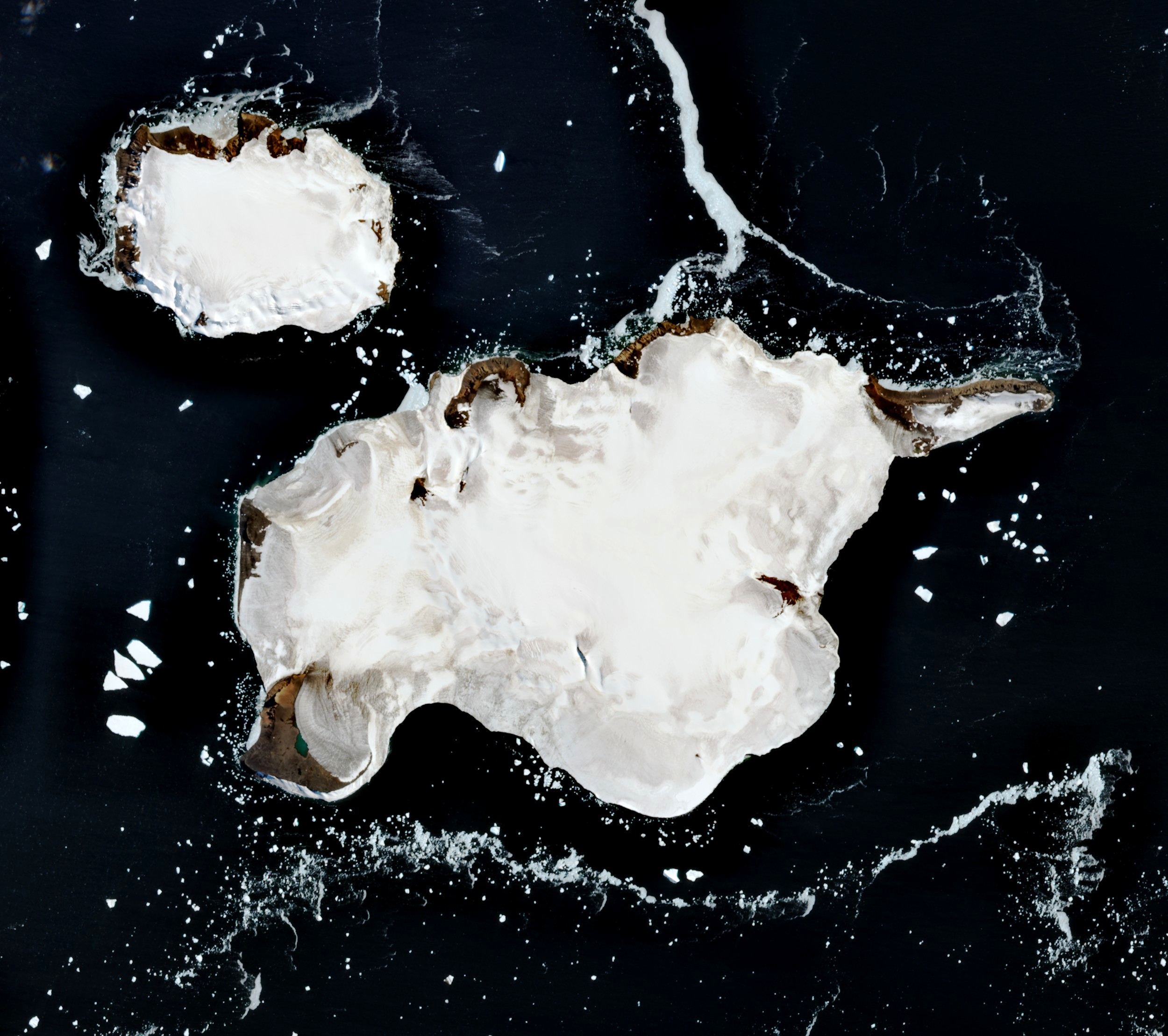
- Satellite image of Andersson Island and Jonassen Island (upper left)

- Location of Andersson Island

- Location within Antarctica

Geography
- Location: Antarctic Sound
- Coordinates: 63°35′S 56°35′W

Andersson Island (63°35′S 56°35′W) is an island 7 nautical miles (13 km; 8.1 mi) long and 4 nautical miles (7.4 km; 4.6 mi) wide, lying 0.5 nautical miles (0.93 km; 0.58 mi) south of Jonassen Island at the west side of the south entrance to Antarctic Sound, off the northeast tip of the Antarctic Peninsula. It is a volcanic island of the James Ross Island Volcanic Group.

== Location ==
Trinity Peninsula on Antarctic Peninsula. Tabarin Peninsula east of the tip

Andersson Island is in Graham Land, just east of the Tabarin Peninsula, which forms the east tip of Trinity Peninsula, which is itself the tip of the Antarctic Peninsula. The smaller Jonassen Island lies just to the north. It is separates from Joinville Island and Dundee Island to the east by the Antarctic Sound. Erebus and Terror Gulf is to the south.

== Exploration and name ==
Andersson Island was originally named Uruguay Island by the Swedish Antarctic Expedition (SwedAE), 1901–04, under Otto Nordenskjöld, after the Argentine ship Uruguay which participated in the rescue of the ship-wrecked Swedish Antarctic Expedition in 1903. In 1904, the French Antarctic Expedition (FrAE) under Jean-Baptiste Charcot, apparently unaware of the Swedish naming, gave the name "Uruguay" to an island off the west coast of Antarctic Peninsula. Since it is confusing to have two islands in close proximity identically named, and because Charcot's Uruguay Island has appeared more widely on maps and in reports, the United States Advisory Committee on Antarctic Names (US-ACAN) accepts the decision of the UK Antarctic Place-Names Committee (UK-APC) that the name given this island by Nordenskjold be altered. The new name commemorates Johan Gunnar Andersson, who was second-in-command of Nordenskjold's expedition.

== Features ==
Features and nearby features include

=== Jonassen Island ===
63°33′S 56°40′W. An island 2.5 nautical miles (4.6 km; 2.9 mi) long, lying 0.5 nautical miles (0.93 km; 0.58 mi) north of Andersson Island in the south entrance to Antarctic Sound. This island was named Irizar Island by the SwedAE, 1901-04, under Nordenskjold, for Captain Julian Irizar of the Argentine ship Uruguay, who rescued the shipwrecked SwedAE in 1903. In 1904 Doctor Jean-Baptiste Charcot, apparently unaware of the Swedish naming, gave the name Irizar to an island off the west coast of Antarctic Peninsula. Since it is confusing to have two islands in close proximity identically named, and because Charcot's Irizar Island has appeared more widely on maps and in reports, the US-ACAN accepts the decision of the UK-APC that the name given this island by Otto Nordenskjöld be altered. The new name commemorates Ole Jonassen, who accompanied Nordenskjold on his two principal sledge journeys in 1902-03.

=== Yalour Sound ===
63°34′S 56°39′W. A passage 1 nautical mile (1.9 km; 1.2 mi) wide and 4 nautical miles (7.4 km; 4.6 mi) long, usually ice bound, linking Fridtjof Sound and Antarctic Sound between Jonassen Island and Andersson Island. Named by Argentina for Lieutenant Jorge Yalour, who accompanied the Uruguay relief expedition of 1903.

=== Cape Scrymgeour ===
63°35′S 56°26′W. High, conspicuous cliffs of red-colored volcanic rock, forming the east end of Andersson Island. The cape was named by Thomas Robertson, captain of the Active of Dundee, Scotland, in 1893. It was re-identified and charted by the FIDS in 1947.

=== Cube Rock ===
63°37′S 56°22′W. A small rock lying in the south entrance to Antarctic Sound, 3 nautical miles (5.6 km; 3.5 mi) southeast of Cape Scrymgeour. The name is a translation of Roca Cubo, a descriptive name appearing on an Argentine chart of 1960.

=== Cape Betbeder ===
63°37′S 56°41′W. A cape which marks the southwest end of Andersson Island, lying in Antarctic Sound off the northeast tip of Antarctic Peninsula. Charted by the SwedAE, 1901-04, under Otto Nordenskjöld, and named by him for Rear Admiral Onofre Betbeder, Argentine Minister of Marine, upon whose orders the Argentine ship Uruguay was dispatched to rescue Nordenskjold's expedition.

== Sources ==
- Alberts, Fred G., ed. (1995), Geographic Names of the Antarctic (PDF) (2 ed.), United States Board on Geographic Names This article incorporates public domain material from websites or documents of the United States Board on Geographic Names.
- Graham Land and South Shetland Islands, BAS: British Antarctic Survey, 2005
- Smellie, J.L.; Johnson, J.S.; Nelson, A.E. (2013), "Geological map of James Ross Island. I. James Ross Island Volcanic Group (1:125 000 scale)" (PDF), BAS GEOMAP 2 Series, Sheet 5, British Antarctic Survey

This article incorporates public domain material from websites or documents of the United States Geological Survey.
