= Archibald Point =

Archibald Point (63°12′S 56°40′W) is an exposed rocky headland on the southwest side of Bransfield Island in Antarctic Sound. It was named by the United Kingdom Antarctic Place-Names Committee (1963) for George K. Archibald, first officer of RRS Shackleton, one of the British Antarctic Survey ships.
