= Knobble Head =

Rock exposure in Antarctic Sound

Knobble Head (63°9′S 56°32′W) is a conspicuous rock exposure forming the eastern extremity of Bransfield Island in Antarctic Sound. This descriptive name was given to the formation by the Falkland Islands Dependencies Survey survey party of 1960–61.
