= Hope Bay, Antarctica =

Bay of Antarctica

- Mount Flora left of center, Esperanza Base centered, Mount Taylor to right of center

- Location within Antarctica
- Coordinates: 63°23′S 56°59′W
- Type: Bay

Hope Bay (Spanish: Bahía Esperanza) (63°23′S 56°59′W) is a bay 3 nautical miles (5.6 km; 3.5 mi) long and 2 nautical miles (3.7 km; 2.3 mi) wide, indenting the tip of the Antarctic Peninsula and opening on Antarctic Sound.

== Location ==
Trinity Peninsula, Antarctic Peninsula. Lafond Bay towards northeast end

Hope Bay is in Graham Land on the north coast of the Trinity Peninsula, which forms the tip of the Antarctic Peninsula. Hope bay is south of Mount Bransfield and southwest of the Mott Snowfield. It opens onto the Antarctic Sound to the west, and faces Joinville Island. It defines the northeast end of the Tabarin Peninsula. Features and nearby features include, clockwise from the east, Mount Flora, Mount Carroll, Depot Glacier, Mount Cardinal, Mount Taylor, Whitten Peak, Twin Peaks, Arena Glacier and Andersson Nunatak.

== Sailing directions ==
The US Defense Mapping Agency's Sailing Directions for Antarctica (1976) describes Hope Bay as follows:

Hope Bay is about 1 2/3 miles wide between Sheppard and Stone Points, Its northwestern and southeastern entrance points, respectively, and indents the coast to a distance of 2 1/2 miles in a southwest direction. The northwestern entrance is a steep wall of ice which, on entering the bay, is backed by steep, sharp-ridged mountains, which trend southwestward forming the walls of a valley. A nunatak with a cliff about 300 feet high, located 2 1/4 miles southwestward of Sheppard Point, is conspicuous. On the opposite side of the bay several lofty pyramidical nunataks are conspicuous on the high, rocky wall. From the southeastern promontory the slopes descend to a low, hilly foreland. At the head of the bay there is a large valley glacier and lateral moraine which terminates at the water's edge in a high vertical cliff. This glacier is fed by the highland ice sheet which extends for some distance southward.

Whitten Peak, at the head of the bay, rises to an elevation of 1,465 feet, and is backed by Mount Taylor, 3,274 feet high, flat-topped and icecapped. Mount Flora, 1,708 feet high, stands at the head of the bay, on the eastern side.

== History ==
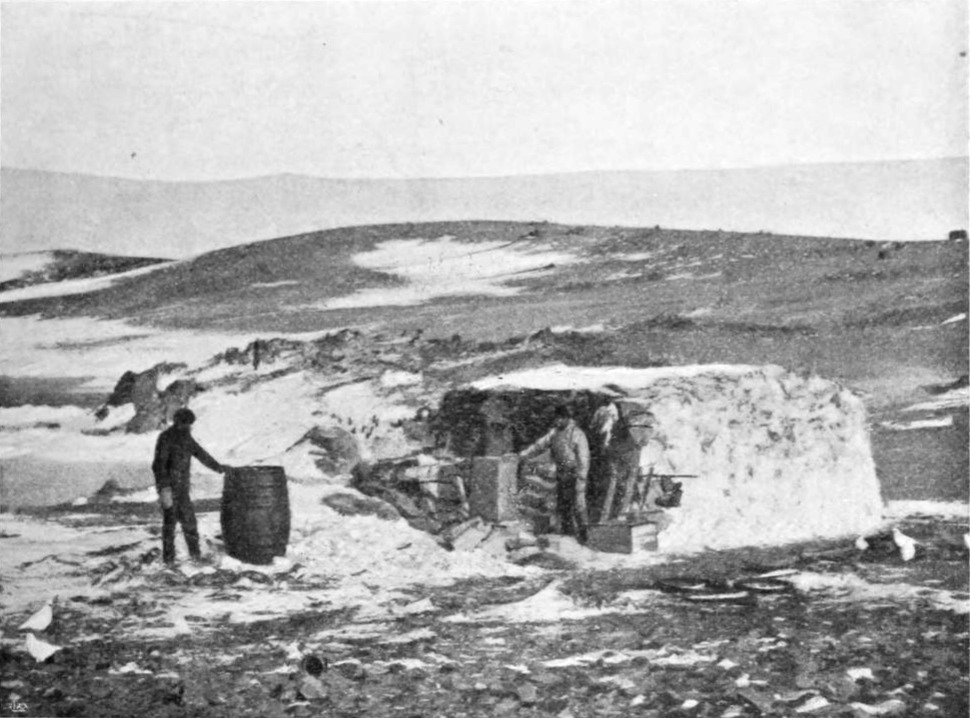
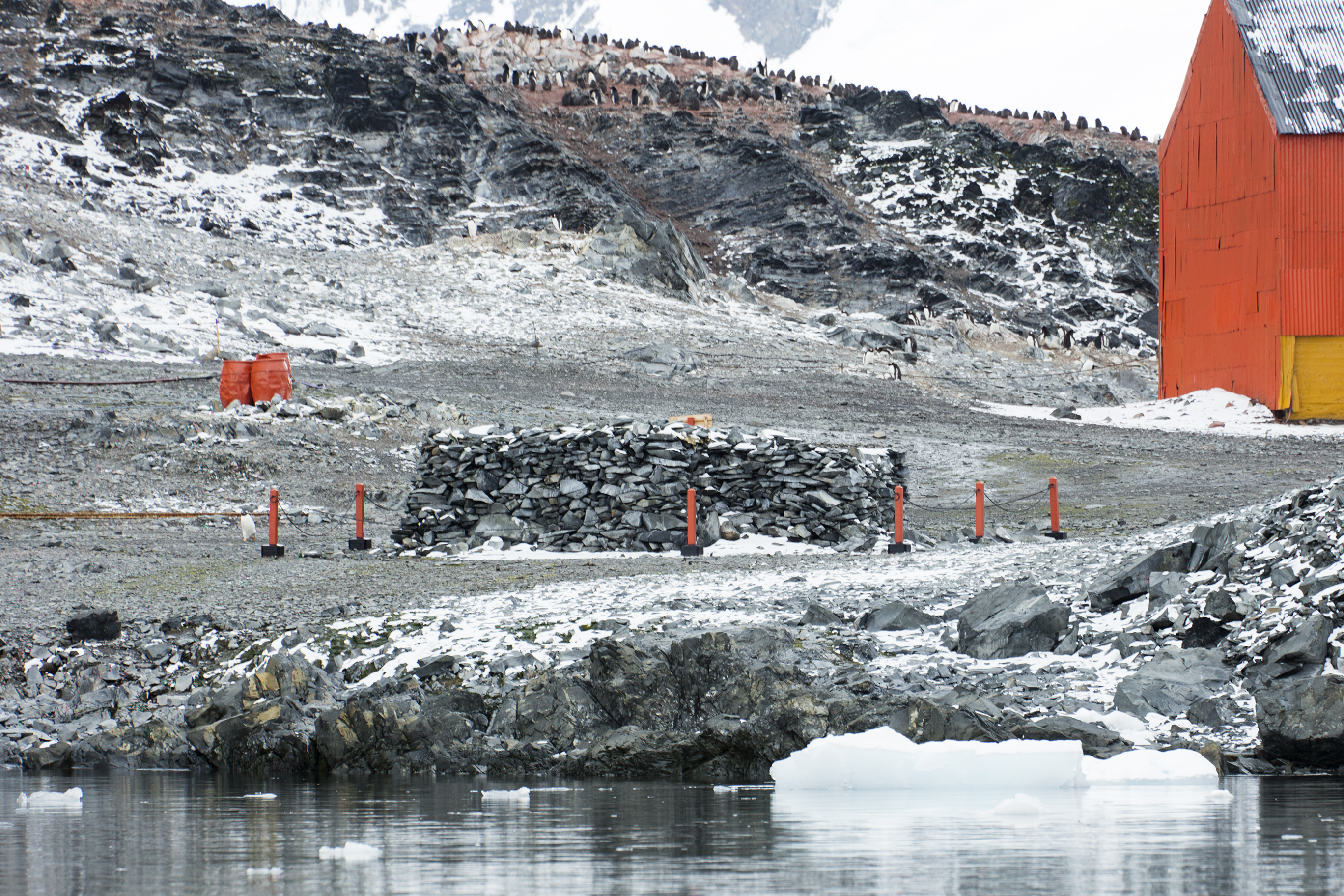
Swedish stone hut at Hope Bay in 1903 and 2016

Hope Bay was discovered on January 15, 1902 by the Swedish Antarctic Expedition (SwedAE) under Otto Nordenskiöld, who named it in commemoration of the winter spent there by J. Gunnar Andersson, S.A. Duse, and Toralf Grunden of his expedition, after his ship (the Antarctic) was crushed by the ice and lost. They were eventually rescued by Argentine corvette Uruguay.

The ruins of a stone hut built in January 1903 by members of the Swedish expedition can still be seen; it has been designated a Historic Site or Monument (HSM 39), following a proposal by Argentina and the United Kingdom to the Antarctic Treaty Consultative Meeting.

Hope Bay was also the scene of the Hope Bay incident when the only shots ever fired in anger in Antarctica took place, in 1952. An Argentine shore party fired a machine gun over the heads of a British Antarctic Survey team unloading supplies from the John Biscoe. The Argentines later extended a diplomatic apology, saying that there had been a misunderstanding and that the Argentine military commander on the ground had exceeded his authority. However, the Argentine party was given a hero's welcome upon its return to Argentina.

== Research Stations ==
=== Elichiribehety Station ===
Elichiribehety Station better known in English by its Spanish acronym ECARE is an Uruguay summer research station, established by the Uruguayan Antarctic Institute on December 22, 1997 on the Antarctic Peninsula.

=== Esperanza Base ===
Esperanza Base is a permanent, all year-round Argentine research station which was established in 1952. It is operated by the Instituto Antartico Argentino and has an average of 55 inhabitants in winter. The base installations have displaced part of a penguin rookery.

=== Station D ===
The old British Station D was established here in 1945 which was occupied by 13 people in the austral winter. It partially burned on November 8, 1948, with the loss of two lives.

A new hut was built on February 4, 1952 in a new place and took the name of Trinity House, it was closed in 1964. On December 8, 1997 the British Antarctic Survey transferred the base to Uruguay, who renamed it Teniente Ruperto Elichiribehety Uruguayan Antarctic Scientific Station (ECARE).

== Important Bird Area ==
The bay has been identified as an Important Bird Area (IBA) by BirdLife International because it supports one of the largest Adélie penguin colonies in Antarctica with around 125,000 pairs. Other birds nesting at the site include gentoo penguins, brown skuas, Antarctic terns, Wilson's storm-petrels, kelp gulls and snowy sheathbills.

== Northern features ==
Features around the north entrance to the bay include, from west to east,

=== Andersson Nunatak ===
63°22′S 57°00′W. A nunatak 1 nautical mile (1.9 km; 1.2 mi) west of Sheppard Point, standing above the coastal ice cliffs on the north shore of Hope Bay. Discovered by Johan Gunnar Andersson's party of the SwedAE which wintered at Hope Bay in 1903. Named for Andersson by the Falkland Islands Dependencies Survey (FIDS) following their survey of the area in 1945.

=== Sheppard Nunatak ===
63°22′S 56°59′W. A conical nunatak 60 metres (200 ft) high which stands close north of Sheppard Point, the north side of the entrance to Hope Bay. This area was first explored by a party of the SwedAE 1901-04. The nunatak was charted in 1945 by the FIDS, and named by them for its association with Sheppard Point.

=== Sheppard Point ===
63°22′S 56°58′W. A point marking the north side of the entrance to Hope Bay, at the northeast end of Antarctic Peninsula. Discovered by a party under J. Gunnar Andersson of the SwedAE, 1901–04, who wintered at Hope Bay in 1903. Named by the FIDS for R. Sheppard, Master of the Eagle who, in February 1945, landed the party which established a FIDS scientific station at Hope Bay.

=== Contact Point ===
63°23′S 56°59′W. A small rock point close west of Sheppard Point on the north side of Hope Bay. The feature was first charted as an island by the SwedAE, 1901–04, but was surveyed by the FIDS in 1955 and proved to be a point. So named by FIDS because greywacke, tuff and diorite were found to be exposed on or very close to this point. Such contacts had not previously been recorded and they were important for the interpretation of the geology of Tabarin Peninsula.

== Western features ==
Nearby features to the west of the head of the bay include, from west to east,

=== Mount Taylor ===
63°26′S 57°08′W. A large, flat-topped mountain, 1,000 metres (3,300 ft) high, having steep cliffs on the northeast side, standing 2.5 nautical miles (4.6 km; 2.9 mi) west-southwest of the head of Hope Bay. Discovered by the SwedAE, 1901–04, under Nordenskjold. The mountain was charted by the FIDS in 1946 and named in 1948 by the UK Antarctic Place-Names Committee (UK-APC) for Captain A. Taylor, commander of the FIDS and leader of its base at Hope Bay in 1945.

=== Eddy Col ===
63°26′S 57°06′W. A steep-sided rocky col between Mount Taylor and Blade Ridge, 1.5 nautical miles (2.8 km; 1.7 mi) southwest of the head of Hope Bay. Surveyed in 1955 by the FIDS, who applied the descriptive name; the wind direction varies continually in this col.

=== Blade Ridge ===
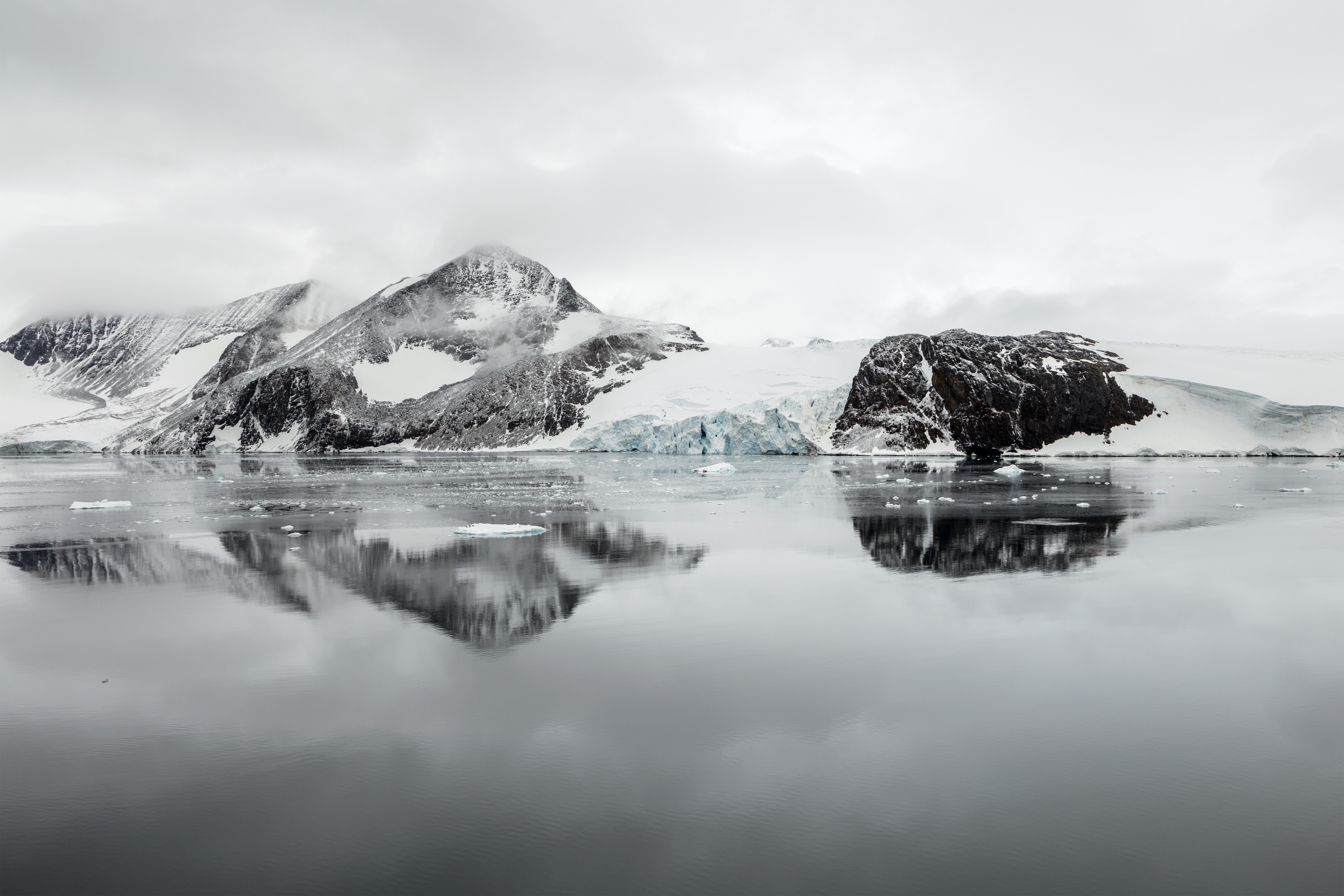
Blade Ridge

63°25′S 57°05′W. A sharp rock ridge marked by three peaks, the highest 575 metres (1,886 ft), forming the northwest wall of Depot Glacier near the head of Hope Bay. Discovered by the SwedAE, 1901–04, under Nordenskjold. The descriptive name was given by the FIDS following their survey of the area in 1945.

=== Whitten Peak ===
63°25′S 57°04′W. A pyramidal peak, 445 metres (1,460 ft) high, forming the northeast end of Blade Ridge at the west side of the head of Hope Bay. Discovered by the SwedAE, 1901–04, under Nordenskjold. Named by the FIDS for R. Whitten, first mate of the ship Eagle, which participated in FIDS operations in 1944-45.

=== Twin Peaks ===
63°24′S 57°07′W. Two sharply defined peaks, 750 metres (2,460 ft) high, standing together 1.5 nautical miles (2.8 km; 1.7 mi) north of Mount Taylor and 2 nautical miles (3.7 km; 2.3 mi) west of the head of Hope Bay. Discovered by the SwedAE, 1901–04, under Nordenskjold. Named by the FIDS following their survey of the area in 1946.

Views of Arena Glacier increasing in detail.

=== Arena Glacier ===
63°24′S 57°03′W. A glacier 3 nautical miles (5.6 km; 3.5 mi) long, flowing northeast from Mount Taylor into Hope Bay 2 nautical miles (3.7 km; 2.3 mi) southwest of Sheppard Point. Mapped in 1948 and 1955 by the FIDS and so named by them because the flat ice floor of the glacier's upper half, surrounded by the steep slopes of Twin Peaks, Mount Taylor and Blade Ridge, resembles an arena.

== Southern features ==
Features along or near the south shore of the bay include, from west to east,

=== Scar Hills ===
63°25′S 57°01′W. A small ridge of hills, with numerous glacial striae, extending from the head of Hope Bay 1 nautical mile (1.9 km; 1.2 mi) northeast along the southeast shore. Discovered and named "Schrammenhiigel" by a party under J. Gunnar Andersson of the SwedAE, 1901-04. An English translation of the name has been approved.

=== Lake Hope ===
63°25′S 57°01′W. A small lake lying 0.5 nautical miles (0.93 km; 0.58 mi) north of Mount Flora, close east of the head of Hope Bay. Named after nearby Hope Bay by Argentine parties working in the area.

=== Mount Flora ===
63°25′S 57°01′W. A mountain, 520 metres (1,710 ft) high, containing a well-defined cirque which faces NE, standing 0.5 nautical miles (0.93 km; 0.58 mi) southeast of the head of Hope Bay. Discovered by the SwedAE under Nordenskjold, 1901–04, and named by J. Gunnar Andersson, second-incommand of the expedition who discovered flora fossils of the Jurassic period in certain strata of this mountain.

=== Nobby Nunatak ===
63°25′S 56°59′W. A nunatak, 270 metres (890 ft) high, standing 1 nautical mile (1.9 km; 1.2 mi) south of Lake Boeckella and 1 nautical mile (1.9 km; 1.2 mi) east of Mount Flora. Nobby Nunatak was first charted and named by the FIDS in 1945. The name is descriptive.

=== The Crest ===
63°25′S 56°59′W. The summit, 125 metres (410 ft) high, of a moraine just east of Lake Boeckella and 0.5 nautical miles (0.93 km; 0.58 mi) south of Hut Cove. Mapped in 1945 and 1948 by the FIDS. The feature marks the summit of the initial steep slope up from the FIDS station at Hope Bay. The name originated locally in about 1945.

=== Lake Boeckella ===
63°24′S 57°00′W. A small lake which lies 0.3 nautical miles (0.56 km; 0.35 mi) south of Hope Bay and drains by a small stream into Eagle Cove, at the northeast end of Antarctic Peninsula. Discovered and named by the SwedAE, 1901–04, under Nordenskjold. Boeckella is a species of crustacean found in this area.

=== Eagle Cove ===
63°24′S 57°00′W. A small cove immediately west of Seal Point along the south side of Hope Bay. Discovered by J. Gunnar Andersson's party of the SwedAE, 1901–04, who wintered at Hope Bay in 1903. Named by the FIDS after the ship Eagle, which participated in the establishment of the FIDS base at Hope Bay in 1945.

=== Seal Point ===
63°24′S 56°59′W. A point which extends north from the southeast shore of Hope Bay between Eagle Cove and Hut Cove, at the northeast end of Antarctic Peninsula. Discovered by a party under J. Gunnar Andersson of the SwedAE, 1901–04, and so named because the party relieved their shortage of food and fuel by killing a seal on this point.

=== Hut Cove ===
63°24′S 56°59′W. A small cove in the east part of Hope Bay between Seal Point and Grunden Rock. Discovered by a party under J. Gunnar Andersson of the SwedAE, 1901–04, who wintered at Hope Bay in 1903. So named in 1945 by the FIDS because they, like the SwedAE, established a base hut on the south shore of this cove.

=== Jagged Rocks ===
63°24′S 56°59′W. A group of jagged rocks lying near the center of Hut Cove in the east part of Hope Bay. First charted in 1903 by a party under J. Gunner Andersson of the SwedAE. Named by the FIDS in 1945.

=== Grunden Rock ===
63°24′S 56°58′W. A rock 15 metres (49 ft) high, surrounded by a group of smaller rocks, lying close east of Hut Cove along the south side of the entrance to Hope Bay. Discovered by the SwedAE under Nordenskjold, 1901-04. The FIDS in 1945 named the entire group of rocks for Toralf Grunden, member of the SwedAE who wintered at Hope Bay in 1903, but in 1952 the name was restricted to the largest rock in this group for easier reference to the light beacon established on the main rock by the Argentine government during the previous season.

=== Stone Point ===
63°24′S 56°56′W. A point with a small islet lying off it, marking the south side of the entrance to Hope Bay. Named by the UK Antarctic Place-Names Committee (UK-APC) for H.W. Stone, First Mate on the Trepassey, 1946–47, following a survey by Lieutenant Commander F.W. Hunt, RN, in 1952.

== Sources ==
- Alberts, Fred G., ed. (1995), Geographic Names of the Antarctic (PDF) (2 ed.), United States Board on Geographic Names This article incorporates public domain material from websites or documents of the United States Board on Geographic Names.
- Deaths of FIDS and BAS Staff in Antarctica, archived from the original on 2013-10-29
- Graham Land and South Shetland Islands, BAS: British Antarctic Survey, 2005
- History of Hope Bay (Station D), British Antarctic Survey
- "Hope Bay", BirdLife data zone: Important Bird Areas, BirdLife International, 2024
- List of Historic Sites and Monuments approved by the ATCM (2012) (PDF), Antarctic Treaty Secretariat, 2012
- Nordenskjöld, Otto; Andersson, Johan Gunnar; Skottsberg, Carl; Larsen, Carl Anton (1905), Antarctica: Or, Two Years Amongst the Ice of the South Pole, Google Books: Hurst and Blackett, limited
- Sailing Directions for Antarctica: Includes Islands South of Latitude 60.̊, United States. Defense Mapping Agency. Hydrographic Center, 1976 This article incorporates public domain material from websites or documents of the National Geospatial-Intelligence Agency.
- Trinity Peninsula (PDF) (Scale 1:250000 topographic map No. 5697), Institut für Angewandte Geodäsie and British Antarctic Survey, 1996, archived from the original (PDF) on 23 September 2015

This article incorporates public domain material from websites or documents of the United States Geological Survey.
