= Eden Rocks =

Islands of Antarctica

Coordinates: 63°29′S 55°40′W

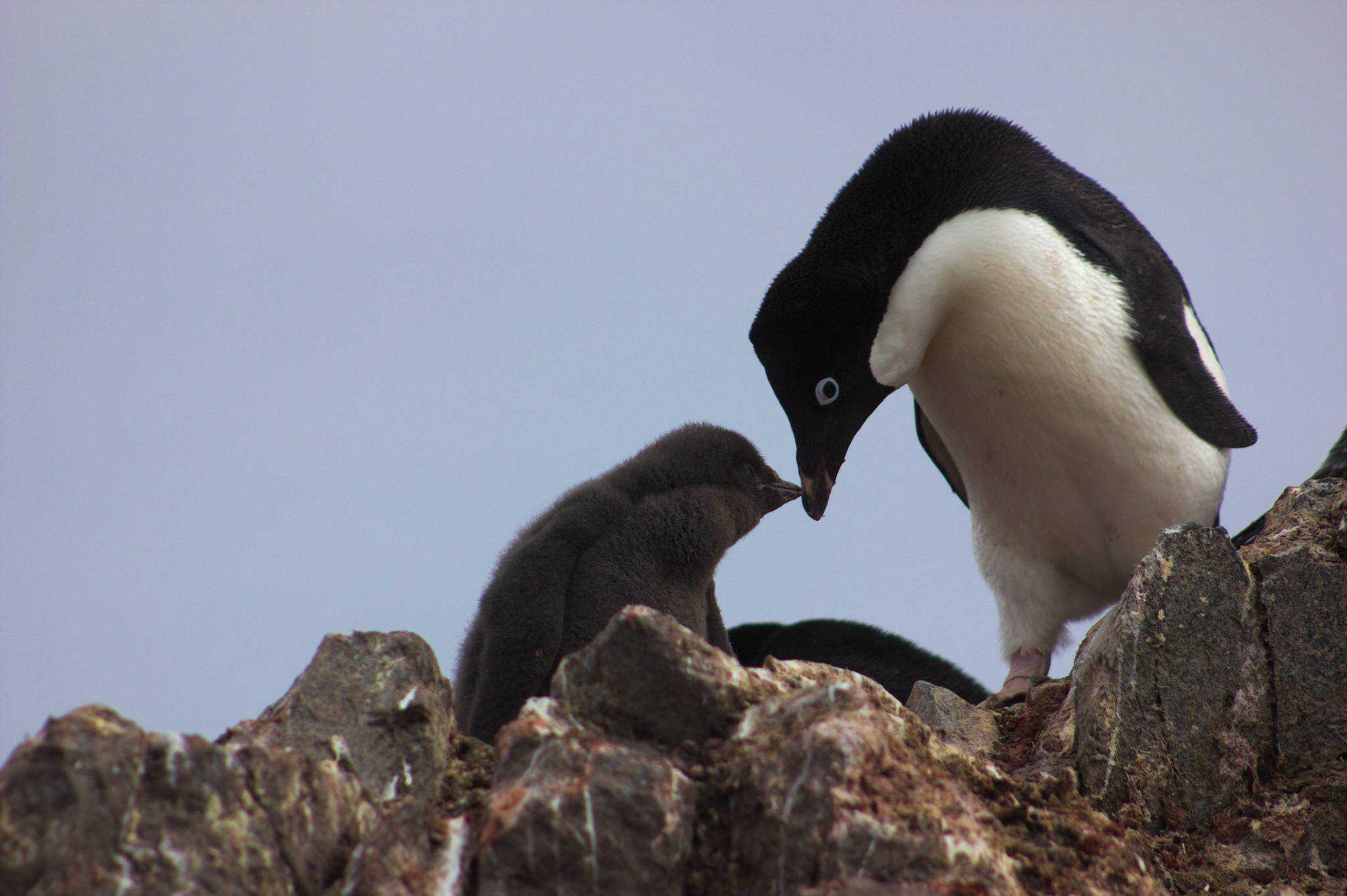
Large numbers of Adélie penguins breed in the IBA

The Eden Rocks are two rocks lying 1.5 km off the east coast of Dundee Island, at the northern end of the Antarctic Peninsula. A small island was reported there on 30 December 1842 by Captain James Clark Ross of the Royal Navy, who named it "Eden Island" for Captain Charles Eden. Following a survey by the Falkland Islands Dependencies Survey in 1953, it was reported that the feature consists of two rocky islets rising to about 90 m in height and lying close together.

== Important Bird Area ==
An 73 ha site, comprising the rocks and the intervening sea, has been identified as an Important Bird Area (IBA) by BirdLife International because it supports a large breeding colony of about 45,000 pairs of Adélie penguins.
