= Antarctic Sound =

Body of water in Antarctica

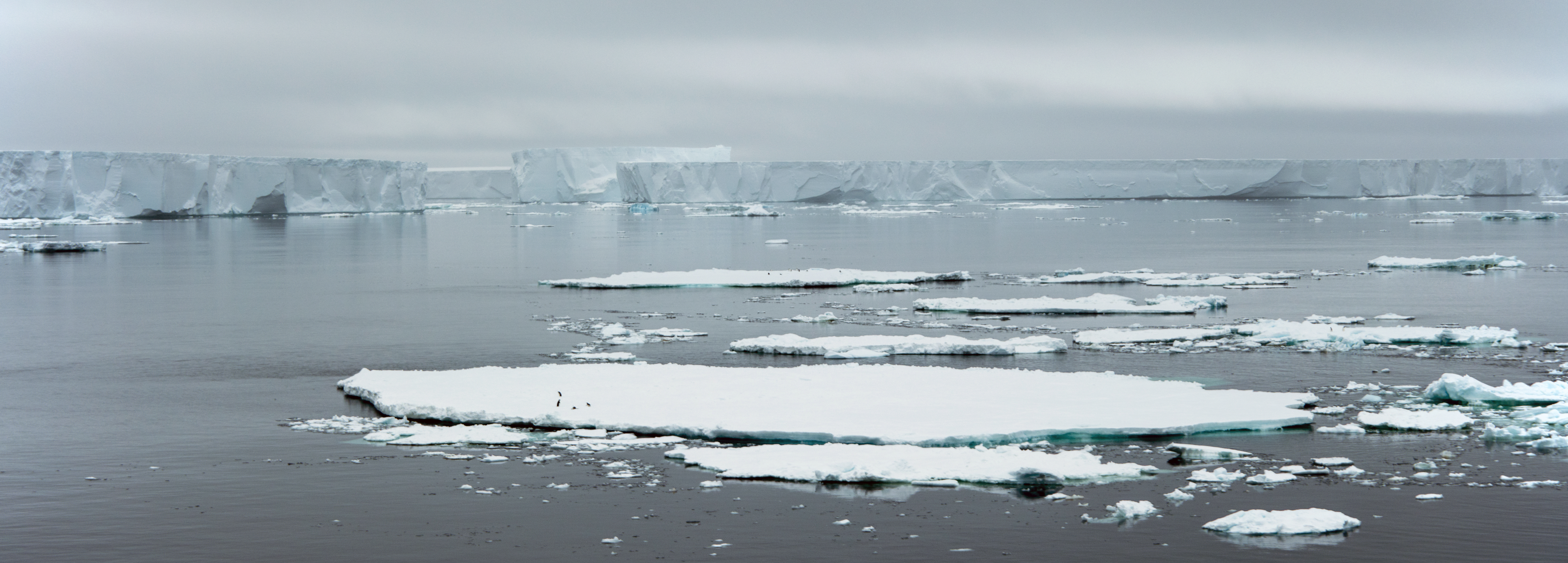
- Sea ice on Antarctic Sound

- Location within Antarctic Peninsula Location within Antarctica
- Coordinates: 63°18′S 56°45′W
- Max. length: 30 mi (50 km)
- Max. width: 12 mi (19 km)

The Antarctic Sound is a body of water about 30 nautical miles (56 km; 35 mi) long and from 7 to 12 nautical miles (13 to 22 km; 8 to 14 mi) wide, separating the Joinville Island group from the northeast end of the Antarctic Peninsula. The sound was named by the Swedish Antarctic Expedition under Otto Nordenskjöld for the expedition ship Antarctic which in 1902, under the command of Carl Anton Larsen, was the first vessel to navigate it. Since 1998 cruise ships have been visiting the area.

== Geography ==
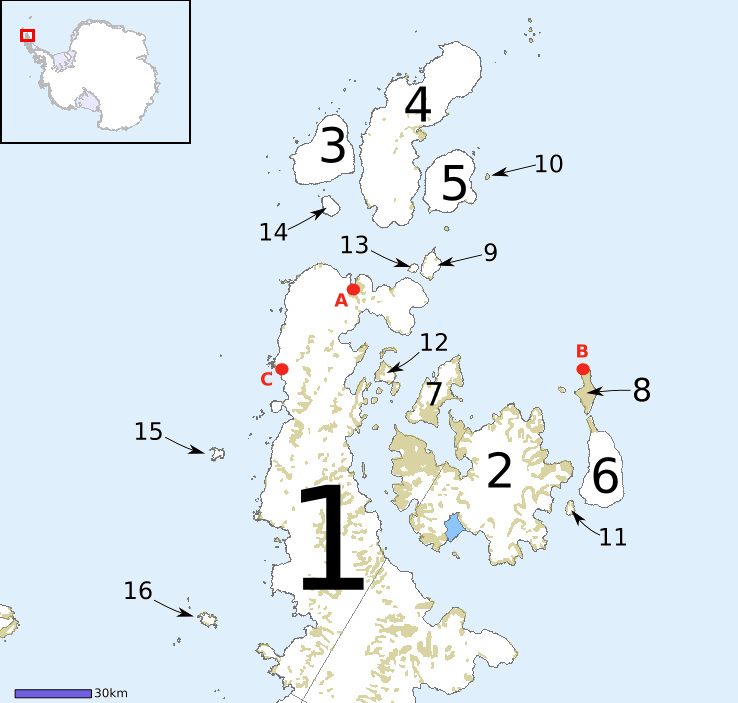
The Antarctic Sound is located between Trinity Peninsula (1) and Joinville Island group consisting of Joinville Island (4), D'Urville Island (3), and Dundee Island (5).

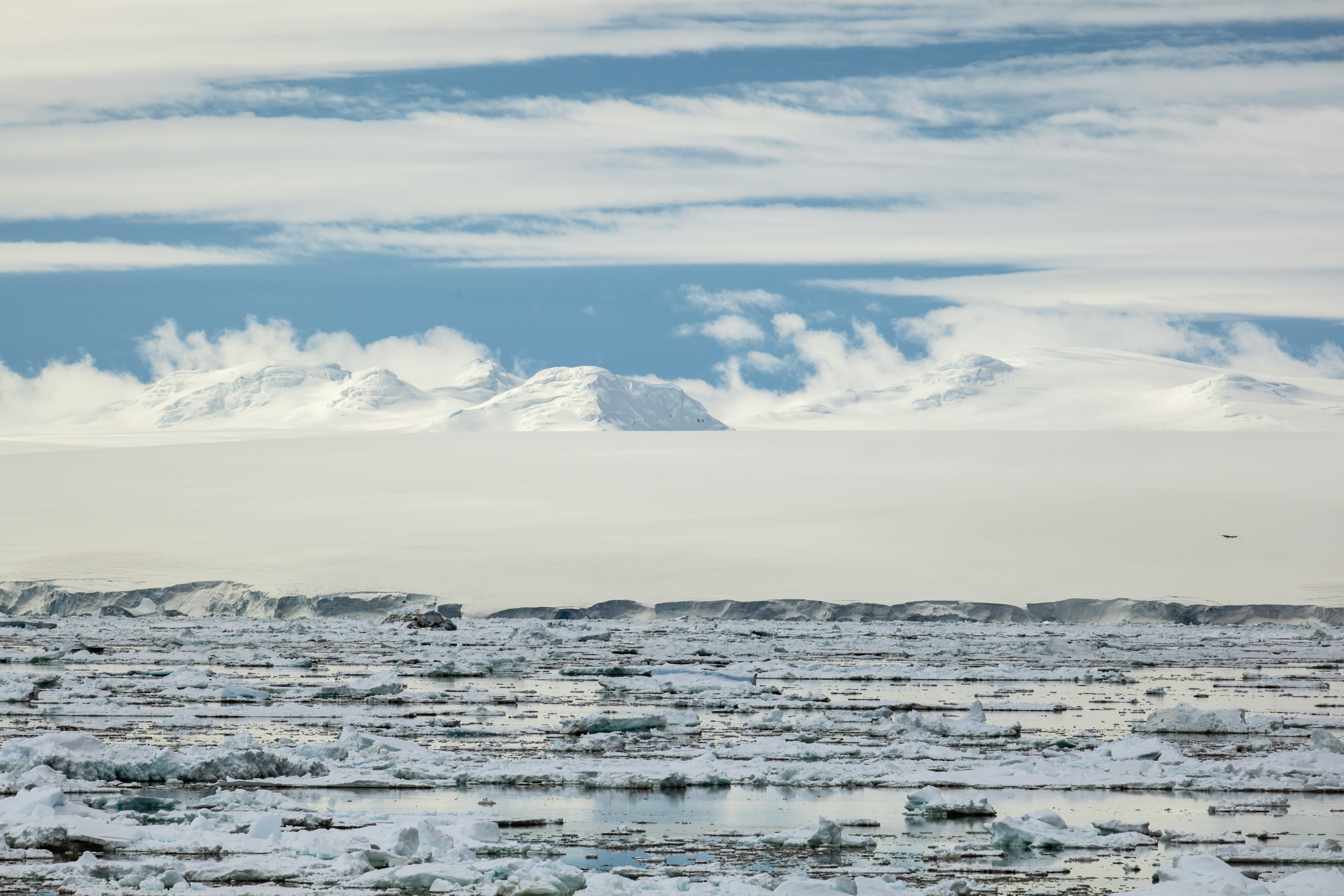
Ice shelf extending from Joinville Island into Antarctic Sound

The Antarctic Sound is the stretch of water that separates Trinity Peninsula, the tip of the Antarctic Peninsula, from the Joinville Island group which consists of D'Urville Island, Joinville Island, Dundee Island and the smaller Bransfield Island. The northern limit of the sound, where it joins the Bransfield Strait, is the line connecting Cape Dubouzet (63°16'S, 57°03'W) on Trinity Peninsula with Turnbull Point (63°02'S, 56°36'W) on D'Urville Island. The southern limit is the line connecting Cape Scrymgeour on Andersson Island (63°35'S, 56°26'W) with Cape Purvis on Dundee Island (63°35'S, 55°58'W). Close to the north of Andersson Island lies the smaller Jonassen Island, the two being separated by the Yalour Strait which joins the Antarctic Sound to the Erebus and Terror Gulf part of the Weddell Sea. The sound is 30 nautical miles (56 km) long and from 7 to 12 nautical miles (13 to 22 km) wide. The Tabarin Peninsula forms the southwestern coast of the Antarctic Sound and contains several bays, the main ones being Hope Bay and Trepassey Bay. Cube Rock lies in the southern entrance southeast of Cape Scrymgeour.

== History ==
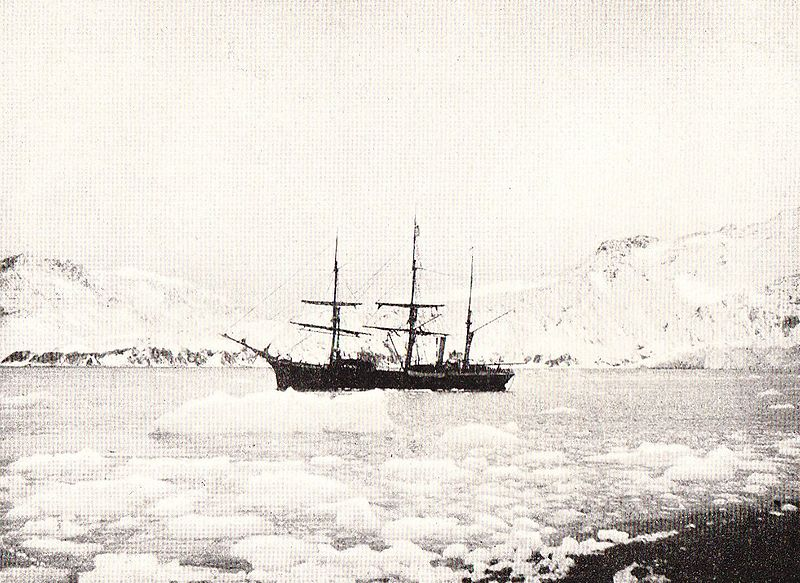
Antarctic, the first vessel to navigate the sound

The Antarctic Sound was first navigated by the vessel Antarctic belonging to the Swedish Antarctic Expedition of 1902, captained by Otto Nordenskjöld. Frequently clogged by pack ice, particularly tabular icebergs broken from the Larsen Ice Shelf, it is deceptive and difficult to traverse, and in the year after its first navigation, the same vessel was trapped and crushed by the ice, the ship's crew spending the winter at Hope Bay. Another vessel trying to navigate the sound en route for Snow Hill Island in 1920, failed to get through and could not even reach Hope Bay, and "Operation Tabarin" in 1944 was beset by similar problems. Hope Bay was at one time the site of a British base, and there is now a permanently staffed Argentinian research station there called Esperanza Base.

== Fauna ==
Hope Bay has been recognised as an Important Bird Area. Birds that breed here include the gentoo penguin, brown skua, Antarctic tern, Wilson's storm petrel, kelp gull and snowy sheathbill. It also houses one of the largest breeding colonies of Adélie penguin in Antarctica. At Trepassey Bay, gentoo and Adélie penguins also breed, as well as Cape petrels, snow petrels, skuas and kelp gulls. Weddell seals often haul out on the beach and leopard seals hunt offshore.
