= Nordenskjöld Basin =

Undersea basin In Antarctica

- Location within Antarctica
- Location: Southern Ocean
- Coordinates: 76°3′S 165°0′E
- Type: Basin
- Etymology: Relation to Nordenskjöld Ice Tongue

Nordenskjöld Basin is an undersea basin named in association with the Nordenskjöld Ice Tongue (itself after explorer Otto Nordenskjöld). Name approved 4/80 (ACUF 201).
