= Jonassen Island =

Antarctic island

Coordinates: 63.55°S 56.68°W

Location of Jonassen Island

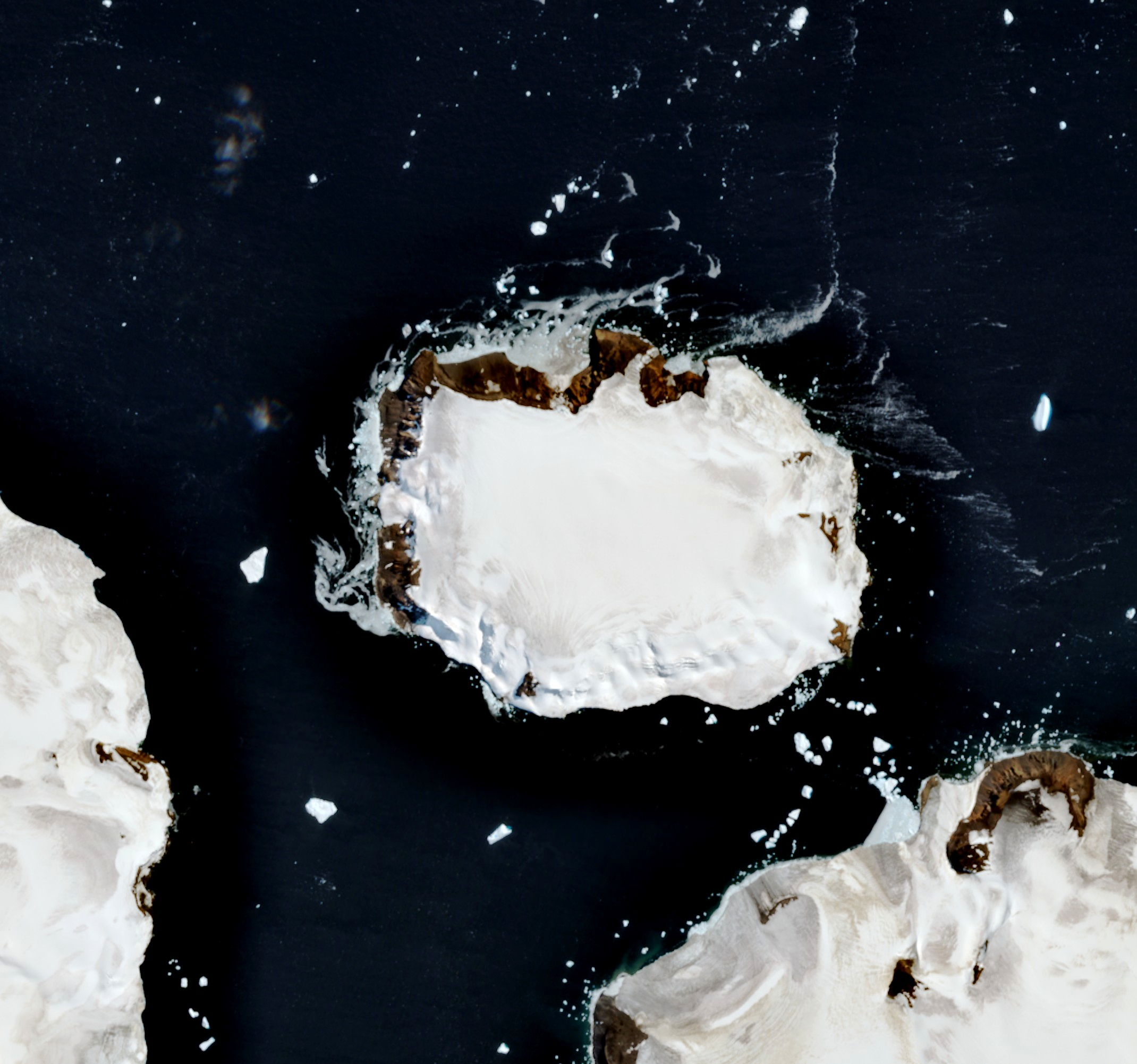
Satellite image of Jonassen Island

Jonassen Island is one of several Antarctic islands around the peninsula known as Graham Land, which is closer to South America than any other part of that continent. It is volcanic in origin and part of the James Ross Island Volcanic Group.

It is said to be a particularly rocky island, 4.1 km (2.5 mi) long. It is located north of Andersson Island.

It was first named Irizar Island by Otto Nordenskiöld in honor of the Argentine captain whose ship Uruguay rescued the Swedish Antarctic Expedition in 1903 after their ship Antarctic had been crushed by ice. A year later, another island elsewhere in the Antarctic was named Irizar and, because that was a larger island and the name was in broad use for the location, the smaller island was renamed for Ole Jonassen, who accompanied Nordenskiöld on his two major sledge journeys in 1902–3.

The main life form on the island are gentoo penguins and kelp gulls. Both species have established breeding colonies on the island. Adélie and chinstrap penguins as well as pintado and snow petrels have been observed around or flying about the island. A 1901 observation listed the Adélie as having nested on the island; the claim has not been substantiated in modern surveys.

== See also ==
- Chaucheprat Point
- Yalour Sound
