= D'Urville Island, Antarctica =

Island in Antarctica

- Location of D'Urville Island

- Location in Antarctica

Geography
- Location: Antarctica
- Coordinates: 63°05′S 56°20′W
- Archipelago: Joinville Island group
- Area: 455.3 km^{2} (175.8 sq mi)
- Length: 27 km (16.8 mi)

Administration
- Administered under the Antarctic Treaty System

Demographics
- Population: Uninhabited

D'Urville Island (63°05′S 56°20′W) is the northernmost island of the Joinville Island group in Antarctica. It is 27 kilometres (17 mi) long, lying immediately north of Joinville Island, from which it is separated by Larsen Channel.

== Location ==
Trinity Peninsula on Antarctic Peninsula. D'Urville Island to the north

D'Urville Island is separated by the Larsen Channel from Joinville Island to the south. It is northeast of the tip of Trinity Peninsula, which itself is the tip of the Antarctic Peninsula. It is southeast of the South Shetland Islands, from which it is separated by Bransfield Strait. Features include Cape Juncal and Turnbull Point. Burden Passage separates d'Urville Island from Bransfield Island to the southwest. Wideopen Island is to the east.

== Exploration and name ==
The single island was charted in 1902 by the Swedish Antarctic Expedition (SwedAE) under Otto Nordenskiöld, who named it for Captain Jules Dumont d'Urville, French explorer who discovered land in the Joinville Island group.

== Features ==
Features and nearby features include:

=== Français Rocks ===
63°02′S 56°00′W. A group of fringing rocks lying off the northeast coast of D'Urville Island. The name "Pointe des Français" (point of the French) was given by Captain Jules Dumont d'Urville (French expedition, 1837–40) to the northeast point of the island which at that time was believed to be continuous with Joinville Island. Surveys by FIDS (1952–54) and aerial photographs by FIDASE (1956–57) have not revealed a definable point hereabout. For the sake of historical continuity in the area, the UK-APC (1978) applied the name Français Rocks to these fringing rocks.

=== Harris Rock ===
62°57′S 56°21′W. The largest and southernmost of a group of three rocks lying north of Montrol Rock and D'Urville Island. The name appears on an Argentine government chart of 1960. Named after Capitán de Navío Santiago Harris, Argentine Navy.

=== Montrol Rock ===
62°58′S 56°21′W. The largest of a group of rocks lying east of Cape Juncal, D'Urville Island. Discovered by the French expedition under Captain Jules Dumont d'Urville, 1837–40, and named after François Mongin de Montrol, a French journalist and politician.

=== Medley Rocks ===
62°58′S 56°01′W. A group of reefs and rocks lying close off the northeast side of D'Urville Island. Surveyed by the Falkland Islands Dependencies Survey (FIDS) in 1953-54 and named in 1956. The name arose because of the medley of reefs and rocks in this area.

=== Cape Juncal ===
62°59′S 56°28′W. A prominent cape forming the northwest extremity of D'Urville Island. The name appears on an Argentine government chart of 1957 and was applied in remembrance of the Argentine naval victory of 1827 at the island of Juncal.

=== Northtrap Rocks ===
62°54′S 56°35′W. A small isolated group of rocks lying northwest of Cape Juncal. In association with Southtrap Rock, so named by UK Antarctic Place-Names Committee (UK-APC) in 1963 because the rocks are the northernmost of two features which should be avoided by vessels entering the Antarctic Sound from the north.

=== Southtrap Rock ===
62°59′S 56°38′W. An isolated rock lying west of Cape Juncal. In association with Northtrap Rocks so named by the UK-APC in 1963 because the rock is the southernmost of two groups of features which should be avoided by vessels entering the Antarctic Sound from the north.

=== Turnbull Point ===
63°02′S 56°36′W. An exposed rocky point at the west extremity of D'Urville Island. Following surveys by FIDS, 1959–61, named after David H. Turnbull, Master of the FIDS/BAS ship Shackleton, 1959–69.

=== Hope Island ===
63°03′S 56°50′W. The largest of a group of small islands lying 6 nautical miles (11 km; 6.9 mi) west of Turnbull Point, D'Urville Island. The name appears on Powell's map published by Laurie in 1822. A French expedition under Captain Jules Dumont d'Urville, 1837–40, charted an island in essentially the same position which was named Daussy Island.

== Sources ==
- Alberts, Fred G., ed. (1995), Geographic Names of the Antarctic (PDF) (2 ed.), United States Board on Geographic Names This article incorporates public domain material from websites or documents of the United States Board on Geographic Names.
- Graham Land and South Shetland Islands, BAS: British Antarctic Survey, 2005

This article incorporates public domain material from websites or documents of the United States Geological Survey.
