= Graham Land =

Section of the Antarctic Peninsula and surrounding islands

Coordinates: 66°00′S 63°30′W

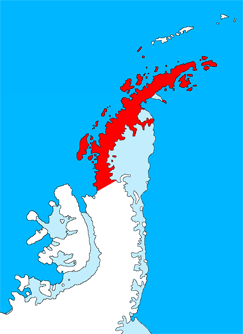
Graham Land

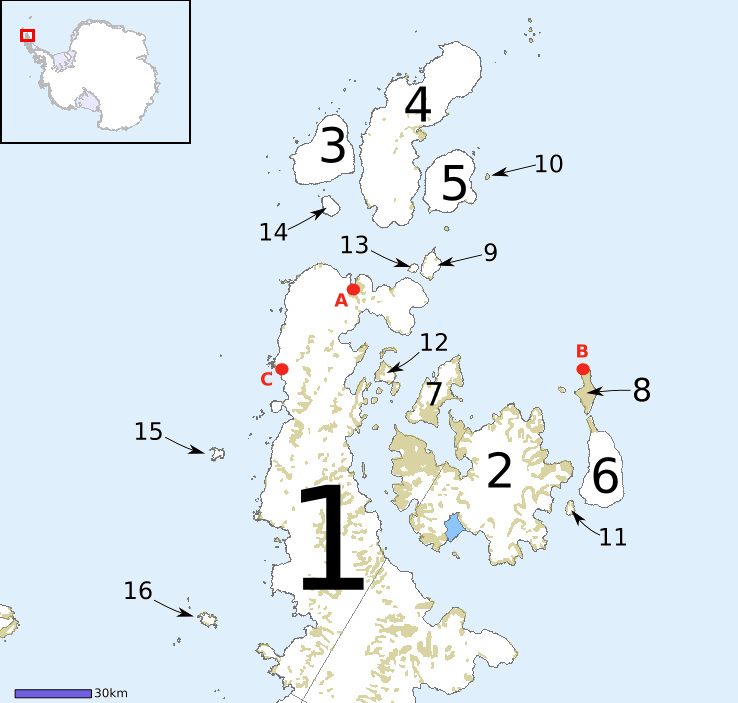
Northern Graham Land and the surrounding islands. 1 Antarctic Peninsula, 2 James Ross Island, 3 D'Urville Island, 4 Joinville Island, 5 Dundee Island, 6 Snow Hill Island, 7 Vega Island, 8 Seymour Island, 9 Andersson Island, 10 Paulet Island, 11 Lockyer Island, 12 Eagle Island, 13 Jonassen Island, 14 Bransfield Island, 15 Astrolabe Island, 16 Tower Island

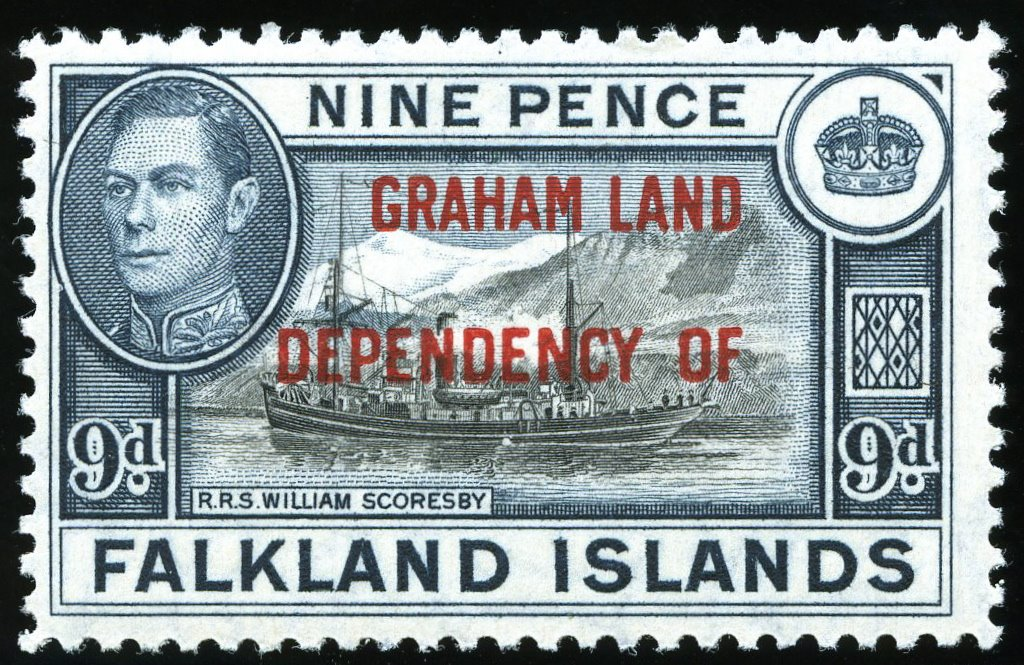
A 1944 stamp of the Falkland Islands overprinted for use in Graham Land

Graham Land is the portion of the Antarctic Peninsula that lies north of a line joining Cape Jeremy and Cape Agassiz. This description of Graham Land is consistent with the 1964 agreement between the British Antarctic Place-names Committee and the US Advisory Committee on Antarctic Names, in which the name "Antarctic Peninsula" was approved for the major peninsula of Antarctica, and the names Graham Land and Palmer Land for the northern and southern portions, respectively. The line dividing them is roughly 69 degrees south.

Graham Land is claimed by Argentina (as part of Argentine Antarctica), Britain (as part of the British Antarctic Territory) and Chile (as part of the Chilean Antarctic Territory).

Graham Land is the closest part of Antarctica to South America. Thus, it is the usual destination for small ships taking paying visitors on Antarctic trips from South America. (Larger ships are not allowed to disembark passengers.)

The mountains of Graham Land are the last range of the American Cordillera, the almost continuous sequence of mountain ranges forming the western "backbone" of North America, Central America, South America and the Antarctic Peninsula.

== Nomenclature ==
Argentina calls the area Tierra de San Martín (Land of San Martin) and also calls the northern peninsula (Trinity Peninsula) Península Trinidad or Tierra de la Trinidad. Similarly, Chile calls the entire Antarctic Peninsula Tierra de O'Higgins (Land of O'Higgins).

In English, Graham Land is named after Sir James R. G. Graham, First Lord of the Admiralty at the time of John Biscoe's exploration of the west side of Graham Land in 1832.

== History ==
Graham Land's creation was volcanic and happened over 200 million years ago. However, volcanic activity eventually ceased, leaving behind ridges and mountains. Specific rocks dated on Graham Land are believed to be older than the land itself, dating to 486 million years in the past.

Geochronology dates certain rocks to specific time periods. Granite in Graham Land, for example, has been dated to the Triassic period. Most of the outcrop, however, consists of igneous rock dating to the Mesozoic and Tertiary periods. Other rocks in Graham Land include adamellite, diorite, rhyolite, dacite, and rhyodacite.

Until the discoveries of the British Graham Land Expedition of 1934–1937, it was generally believed to be an archipelago rather than a peninsula. In 1933, Graham Land was thought of to be a large island divided from mainland Antarctica by channels. It offered explorers and researchers many opportunities to study polar biology and geology. During the British Graham Land Expedition, researchers discovered fossil plants.

== Flora and fauna ==
Graham Land is home to many varieties of arthropods, such as the Antarctic springtail, Diphascon puniceum (a species of water bear), Antarctic midge, lice, and mites. Birds such as the snow petrel have been reported in the area. At least three species of penguin have been spotted: the Adélie, Chinstrap, and Gentoo.

Graham Land is also home to plants such as moss and liverworts. Some of these are native only to polar areas, such as Ditrichum conicum, while others can be found around the world, such as Amphidium lapponicum. Antarctic hair grass, a flowering plant, has been seen near Graham Land.

== Features ==
=== Peaks ===
- Mount Brading, seven kilometres (four nautical miles) east of the northeast corner of Larsen Inlet.
- The Downfall, located between the heads of Arago Glacier and Woodbury Glacier.
- Mount Kennett, on the east side.

=== Plateaus ===
The interior of Graham Land is occupied by a series of plateaus (north to south): Laclavère Plateau, Louis Philippe Plateau, Detroit Plateau, Herbert Plateau, Foster Plateau, Forbidden Plateau, Bruce Plateau, Avery Plateau and Hemimont Plateau.

== See also ==
- British Graham Land Expedition
- Geology of the Antarctic Peninsula
- Gerlache Strait Geology
