= Joinville Island =

Island of Antarctica

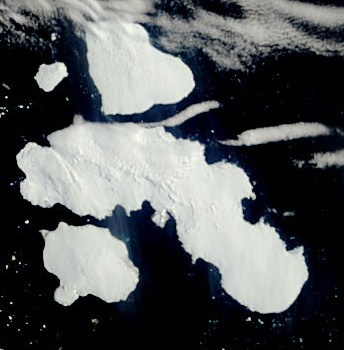
- Joinville Island (center) between d'Urville Island (above) and Dundee Island (below)

- Location of Joinville Island

- Location within Antarctica

Geography
- Location: Antarctica
- Coordinates: 63°15′S 55°45′W
- Archipelago: Joinville Island group
- Area: 1,607 km^{2} (620 sq mi)
- Length: 74 km (46 mi)
- Width: 22 km (13.7 mi)

Joinville Island (63°15′S 55°45′W) is the largest island of the Joinville Island group, about 40 nautical miles (74 km; 46 mi) long in an east–west direction and 12 nautical miles (22 km; 14 mi) wide, lying off the northeastern tip of the Antarctic Peninsula, from which it is separated by the Antarctic Sound.

== Location ==
Trinity Peninsula on Antarctic Peninsula. Joinville Island group to the north

Joinville Island lies in Graham Land to the east of the tip of Trinity Peninsula, which is itself the tip of the Antarctic Peninsula. The Antarctic Sound separates it from the Trinity Peninsula. D'Urville Island is to the north, Danger Islands to the east and Dundee Island to the west. Northern features include Cape Kinnes, Boral Point, King Point and Fitzroy Point. Southern features include Mount Percy, Mount Quilmes, Tay Head and Moody Point.

== Sailing directions ==
The US Defense Mapping Agency's Sailing Directions for Antarctica (1976) describes Joinville Island as follows:

Joinville Island is the largest of [the Joinville Island Group], being about 41 miles in length east and west, from Antarctic Sound to Moody Point, its eastern extremity. It is about 12 miles north and south at its greatest breadth. The island is completely ice-capped, the summit of which is Mount Percy, about 2,510 feet high, a flat cupola with twin-peaked feature. Bare rock is visible only where the surfaces are nearly perpendicular or to steep for snow to lodge upon it. The north coast is marked by two rugged headland promontories, Capes King and FitzRoy, between which are two bays ...

== Discovery and name ==
Joinville Island was discovered and charted roughly during 1838 by a French expedition commanded by Captain Jules Dumont d'Urville, who named it for François d'Orléans, Prince of Joinville (1818–1900), the third son of Louis-Philippe, Duke of Orléans.

== Northern features ==
Features in the north of the island, from west to east, include:

=== Cape Kinnes ===
63°22′S 56°33′W. A cape which forms the west extremity of Joinville Island, off the northeast end of Antarctic Peninsula. Named by members of the Dundee whaling expedition 1892–93, for R. Kinnes, sponsor of the expedition.

=== Madder Cliffs ===
63°18′S 56°29′W. Reddish rock cliffs rising steeply from the sea to about 305 metres (1,001 ft) high and forming the north side of the entrance to Suspires Bay, at the west end of Joinville Island. Surveyed by the Falkland Islands Dependencies Survey (FIDS) in 1953-54. The name, given in 1956 by the UK Antarctic Place-Names Committee (UK-APC), is descriptive of the red color of the rocks, madder being a red vegetable dye.

=== Suspiros Bay ===
63°19′S 56°28′W. A small bay indenting the west end of Joinville Island just south of Madder Cliffs. The name was proposed by Captain Emilio L. Díaz, commander of the Argentine Antarctic task force (1951-52). The toponym alludes to the difficulties encountered in surrounding the bay.

=== Balaena Valley ===
63°20′S 56°23′W. A gently sloping valley, filled with ice, lying east of Suspires Bay in the west part of Joinville Island. Surveyed by the FIDS in 1953-54. The Balaena (Alexander Fairweather, master) was one of the Dundee whaling ships that visited the Joinville Island group in 1892-93. The name was applied in 1956 by the UK-APC and derives from association with Cape Kinnes 4 nautical miles (7.4 km; 4.6 mi) to the SW; Robert Kinnes was the Dundee shipowner and merchant who equipped these ships for their Antarctic voyage.

=== Saxum Nunatak ===
63°10′S 56°02′W. An isolated nunatak, 430 metres (1,410 ft) high, standing 6 nautical miles (11 km; 6.9 mi) north of Mount Tholus on the north side of Joinville Island. It is dome-shaped when seen from the south, but has a conspicuous rock wall on its northern side. Surveyed by the FIDS in 1954. The name is descriptive of the feature as seen from the north, "saxum" being Latin for wall.

=== Gaviotín Rock ===
63°08′S 56°01′W. A rock lying in Larsen Channel, about 0.25 nautical miles (0.46 km; 0.29 mi) north of the coastal ice cliffs of Joinville Island and 2 nautical miles (3.7 km; 2.3 mi) north of Saxum Nunatak. The name Gaviotín (gull) appears on an Argentine government chart of 1957.

=== Boreal Point ===
63°07′S 55°48′W. A point forming the west side of Rockpepper Bay, along the north coast of Joinville Island. Surveyed by the FIDS in 1953-54. The feature was so named by the UK-APC because of its position on the north coast of Joinville Island.

=== Rockpepper Bay ===
63°08′S 55°44′W. A bay 3.5 nautical miles (6.5 km; 4.0 mi) wide at its entrance, lying east of Boreal Point along the north coast of Joinville Island. Surveyed by the FIDS in 1953-54. So named by the UK-APC because of the very many small islands and rocks in the bay.

=== King Point ===
63°09′S 55°27′W. A point marking the west side of the entrance to Ambush Bay on the north coast of Joinville Island. Discovered on 30 December 1842 by a British expedition under Ross, who named it Cape King for Captain (later Rear Admiral) Phillip Parker King, RN, 1793-1856, English naval surveyor who made notable improvements to the charts of Australia and South America.

=== Ambush Bay ===
63°10′S 55°26′W. A bay 3.5 nautical miles (6.5 km; 4.0 mi) wide indenting the north coast of Joinville Island immediately east of King Point. Surveyed by the FIDS in 1953. The name arose because the bay is a trap for the unwary if its shallow and foul nature is not known.

=== Fliess Bay ===
63°12′S 55°10′W. A bay lying immediately west of Fitzroy Point along the north coast of Joinville Island. The name appears on an Argentine government chart of 1957. Named "Caleta Almirante Fliess" after Admiral Felipe Fliess (1878-1952) who, as a lieutenant, was commander of the Argentine navy group detached for duty with the crew of the ship Uruguay in 1903, on the occasion of the rescue expedition to the members of the SwedAE (1901-04) led by Doctor Otto Nordenskjold.

=== Fitzroy Point ===
63°11′S 55°07′W. A low point at the east side of Fliess Bay forming the northeast extremity of Joinville Island. Discovered on 30 December 1842 by a British expedition under James Clark Ross, who named it Cape Fitzroy for Captain (later Vice Admiral) Robert Fitzroy, RN (1805-65), English hydrographer and meteorologist.

== Southern features ==
=== D'Urville Monument ===
63°25′S 56°18′W. A conspicuous conical summit, 575 metres (1,886 ft) high, at the southwest end of Joinville Island. Discovered by a British expedition, 1839-43, under James Clark Ross, and named by him for Captain Jules Dumont d'Urville.

=== Diana Reef ===
63°26′S 56°11′W. An isolated reef lying 3 nautical miles (5.6 km; 3.5 mi) east of D'Urville Monument, Joinville Island, in Active Sound. Roughly surveyed by FIDS in 1954. Named in 1956 by UK-APC after Diana (Robert Davidson, master), one of the ships of the Dundee whaling expedition which visited the Joinville Island area in 1892-93.

=== Nodule Nunatak ===
63°19′S 56°05′W. A small but prominent isolated nunatak, 440 metres (1,440 ft) high, standing 3 nautical miles (5.6 km; 3.5 mi) south of Mount Tholus in the southern part of Joinville Island. Surveyed by the FIDS in 1953-54. The descriptive name was given by the UK-APC in 1956.

=== Mount Tholus ===
63°16′S 56°04′W. The highest mountain, 825 metres (2,707 ft) high, in the ridge extending southwest from Postern Gap in the central part of Joinville Island. Surveyed by the FIDS in 1953-54 and named by the UK-APC in 1956. The name is descriptive, "tholus" being a circular, domed structure.

=== Postern Gap ===
63°15′S 55°59′W. A pass in the central ridge of Joinville Island, just east of Mount Tholus. Surveyed by the FIDS in 1954. So named by the UK-APC because this is the only way through the ridge which gives access to the central part of the south coast of Joinville Island.

=== Gibson Bay ===
63°19′S 55°53′W. A small bay on the south side of Joinville Island, lying just west of Mount Alexander at the junction of Active Sound and the Firth of Tay. Discovered and named on 8 January 1893 by Thomas Robertson, master of the ship Active, one of the Dundee whalers.

=== Mount Percy ===
63°15′S 55°49′W. A prominent mountain, 765 metres (2,510 ft) high, the highest feature on Joinville Island, standing immediately north of Mount Alexander near the center of the island. Discovered by a British expedition under Ross on 30 December 1842, and named for Rear Admiral the Honorable Josceline Percy, RN, 1784-1856. Although this mountain is not surmounted by twin peaks, as described by Ross, there are a number of peaks of similar height in its vicinity, one of which may have given rise to Ross' description.

=== Mount Alexander ===
63°18′S 55°48′W. A mountain with several summits, the highest 595 metres (1,952 ft) high, forming the rocky peninsula separating Gibson Bay and Haddon Bay, on the south side of Joinville Island. The cliff marking the extremity of the peninsula was discovered and named Cape Alexander on 8 January 1893 by Thomas Robertson, master of the ship Active, one of the Dundee whalers. The name was amended to Mount Alexander by the UK-APC in 1956 following a survey by the FIDS in 1953-54, the mountain summits of the peninsula being considered more suitable to name.

=== Haddon Bay ===
63°18′S 55°44′W. A bay lying immediately east of Mount Alexander along the south coast of Joinville Island. Discovered in January 1893 by Thomas Robertson, master of the ship Active, one of the Dundee whalers. Surveyed by the FIDS in 1953 and named by the UK-APC in 1956 for Professor Alfred C. Haddon (1855-1940), who helped Doctor W.S. Bruce with his preparations for scientific work with the Dundee whaling expedition.

=== Mount Quilmes ===
63°14′S 55°37′W. A mainly snow-covered mountain, 715 metres (2,346 ft), standing northeast of Haddon Bay. The name was given during the course of the Argentine Antarctic Expedition (1953-54) and memorializes the battle of the same name in which the Argentine squadron of Admiral Guillermo Brown was engaged.

=== Tay Head ===
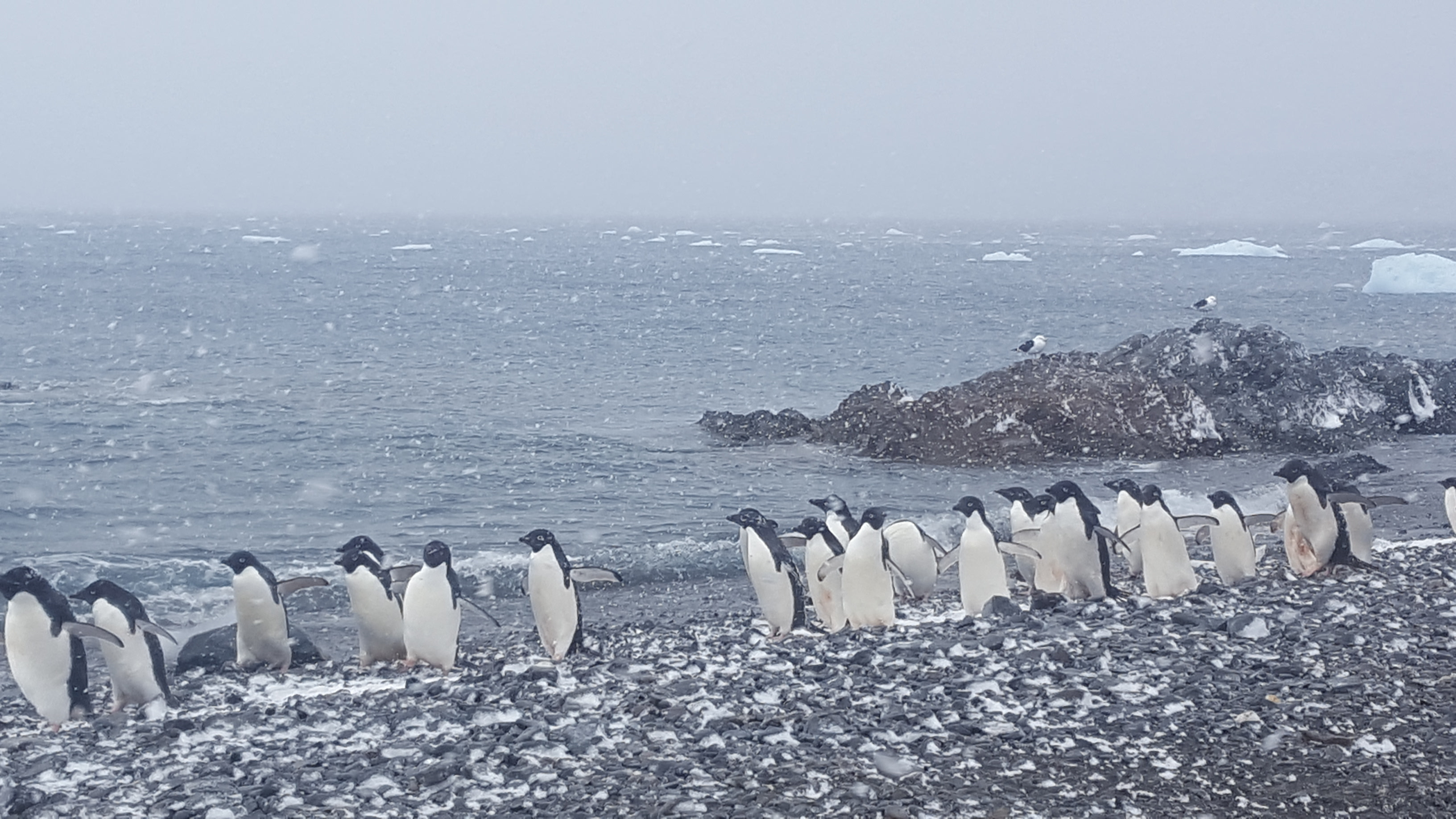
Tay Head pebble beach

63°21′S 55°34′W. A rocky headland 6 nautical miles (11 km; 6.9 mi) east of Mount Alexander, extending into the Firth of Tay on the south coast of Joinville Island. The name, given by the UK-APC in 1963, is derived from the Firth of Tay.

=== Taylor Nunataks ===
63°15′S 55°33′W. Two isolated nunataks, 650 metres (2,130 ft) high and 660 metres (2,170 ft) high, joined by a narrow ridge, lying southeast of Mount Quilmes in the eastern half of Joinville Island. Surveyed by the FIDS in 1953. Named by the UK-APC for Robert J.F. Taylor of FIDS, dog-physiologist at Hope Bay in 1954 and 1955, who accompanied the FIDS survey party to Joinville Island in 1953-54.

=== Moody Point ===
63°18′S 55°01′W. A point which forms the east end of Joinville Island. Discovered by a British expedition under Ross, 1839-43, and named by him for Lieutenant Governor Moody of the Falkland Islands.

=== Williwaw Rocks ===
63°20′S 55°01′W. Two small rocks lying 2 nautical miles (3.7 km; 2.3 mi) south of Moody Point. Surveyed by the FIDS in 1953. The name arose because williwaws appear to be characteristic in the vicinity of Moody Point and the nearby Danger Islands.

=== Scud Rock ===
63°23′S 55°01′W. An isolated rock lying 4 nautical miles (7.4 km; 4.6 mi) south of Moody Point. Roughly surveyed by the FIDS in 1953. So named by the UK-APC because scud (low, fast moving cloud) is characteristic of this area.

== Sources ==
- Alberts, Fred G., ed. (1995), Geographic Names of the Antarctic (PDF) (2 ed.), United States Board on Geographic Names This article incorporates public domain material from websites or documents of the United States Board on Geographic Names.
- Graham Land and South Shetland Islands, BAS: British Antarctic Survey, 2005
- Sailing Directions for Antarctica: Includes Islands South of Latitude 60.̊, United States. Defense Mapping Agency. Hydrographic Center, 1976 This article incorporates public domain material from websites or documents of the National Geospatial-Intelligence Agency.
