= Dundee Island =

Island at the tip of the Antarctic Peninsula

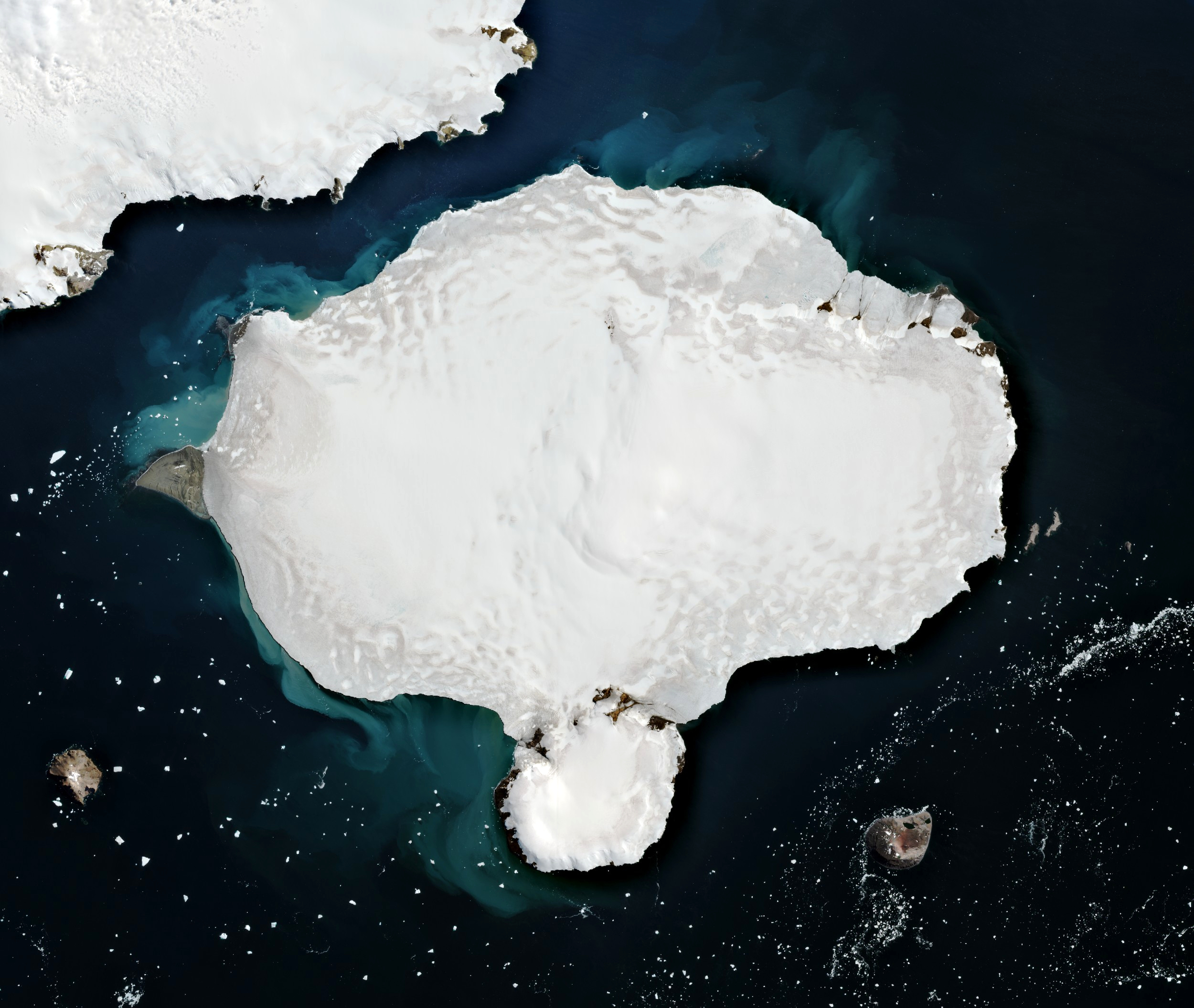
- Aerial view of Dundee Island

- Location of Dundee Island

- Location in Antarctica

Geography
- Location: Antarctica
- Coordinates: 63°30′S 55°55′W
- Archipelago: Joinville Island group

Administration
- Administered under the Antarctic Treaty System

Demographics
- Population: 10 Petrel Base (ARG) Crew

Dundee Island (63°30′S 55°55′W) is an ice-covered island lying east of the northeastern tip of the Antarctic Peninsula and south of Joinville Island, Antarctica.

== Location ==
Trinity Peninsula on Antarctic Peninsula. Dundee Island to the north

Dundee Island is in the Joinville Island group in Graham Land. It is south of Joinville Island and east of the Trinity Peninsula, which in turn is the tip of the Antarctic Peninsula. It is separated from Joinville Island by Active Sound and the Firth of Tay, and separated from Trinity Peninsula by the Antarctic Sound. Features include the Petrel Base (Argentina) and Cape Purvis in the south. Nearby features include Eden Rocks and Paulet Island.

== Early history ==
Dundee Island was discovered on January 8, 1893 by Captain Thomas Robertson of the Active and named for the home port, Dundee, Scotland, from whence the ship sailed in company with three other vessels in search of whales. It is from this island that the American businessman Lincoln Ellsworth, accompanied by the pilot Herbert Hollick-Kenyon, took off on 21 November 1935 for the first crossing of Antarctica by plane.

== Petrel Base ==
The Petrel Base is a scientific station in Antarctica belonging to Argentina. Its coordinates are 63°28′41″S 56°13′51.6″W and it is located on Welchness cape, Petrel Cove, the only area on Dundee Island that is free of ice and has access to the sea. The area has a diverse bird population. Weddell seals and leopard seals are sometimes seen near the coast. It was established as Petrel Refuge in December 1952, with a small airstrip. The airstrip was extended in summer of 1966–67, and a large metal hangar and other buildings were erected. The base was evacuated after a fire in the winter of 1974, and became a temporary summer station in February 1978. The base infrastructure has 3,600 square metres (39,000 sq ft) under roof, a 1,200-square-metre (13,000 sq ft) logistics area and 25 beds.

== Features ==
Features and nearby features include, clockwise from the west:

=== Welchness ===
63°29′S 56°14′W. A gravel spit which forms the west extremity of Dundee Island. Roughly charted by the Dundee whaling expedition (1892-93) and named after Captain George Welch (d.1891), a leading Dundee whaler and Manager, from about 1860 onward, of the Jay Whale Fishing Company, which for many years owned the Dundee whaling expedition ship Active.

=== Petrel Cove ===
63°28′S 56°13′W. A small coastal indentation at the west end of Dundee Island between Welchness and Diana Reef on Joinville Island. The cove is adjacent to the Argentine station "Petrel," established in 1951-52, from which it takes its name.

=== Active Reef ===
63°23′S 55°52′W. An isolated reef lying in the Firth of Tay, just off the north coast of Dundee Island. Discovered and named by Thomas Robertson, master of the Active, one of the ships of the Dundee whaling expedition of 1892–1893. Active ran onto this reef during a gale on January 10, 1893, and lay there for six hours before she could be gotten off.

=== Cape Purvis ===
63°35′S 55°58′W. A cape forming the south extremity of Dundee Island. Discovered in December 1842 by Captain James Ross, and named by him for Commodore (later Rear Admiral) John B. Purvis, Royal Navy, who was of assistance to Ross's expedition.

== Sources ==
- Alberts, Fred G., ed. (1995), Geographic Names of the Antarctic (PDF) (2 ed.), United States Board on Geographic Names This article incorporates public domain material from websites or documents of the United States Board on Geographic Names.
- Antarctic Station Catalogue (PDF) (catalogue), Council of Managers of National Antarctic Programs, August 2017, p. 23, ISBN 978-0-473-40409-3
- Graham Land and South Shetland Islands, BAS: British Antarctic Survey, 2005
- Wexler, Alan; Cunningham, Jon (2019), Biographical Dictionary of Explorers, Infobase Holdings, ISBN 978-1-4381-8215-5

This article incorporates public domain material from websites or documents of the United States Geological Survey.
