= Joinville Island group =

Group of Antarctic islands

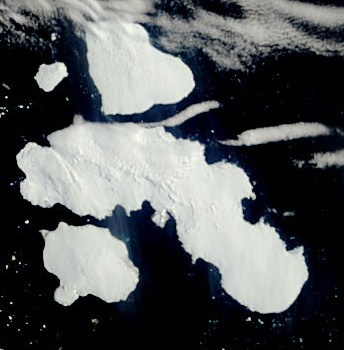
- Satellite picture of the group

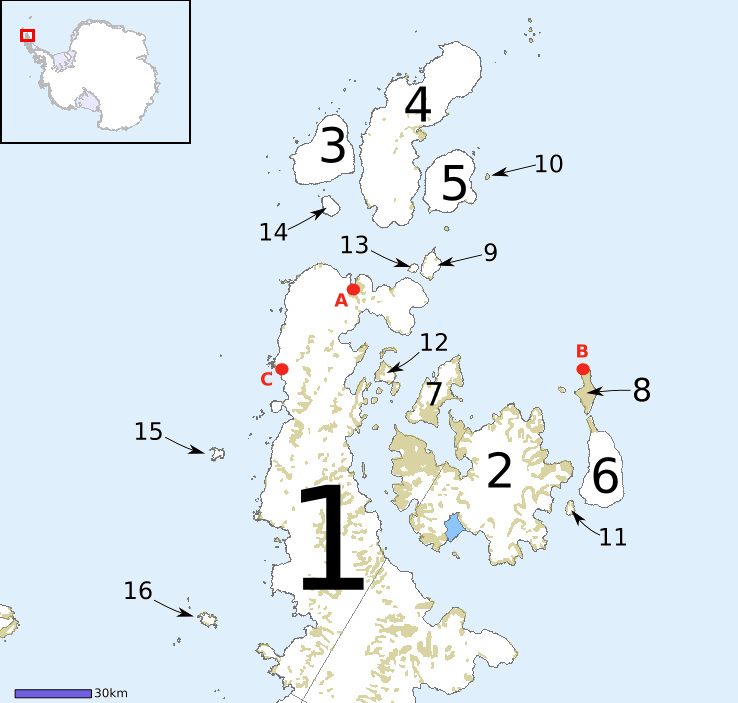
- Joinville Island group: D'Urville Island (3) – Joinville Island (4) – Dundee Island (5) – Bransfield Island (14)

- Location within Antarctica

Geography
- Location: Antarctica
- Coordinates: 63°15′S 55°45′W
- Archipelago: Joinville Island group

Administration
- Administered under the Antarctic Treaty System

Demographics
- Population: Uninhabited

Joinville Island group is a group of antarctic islands, lying off the northeastern tip of the Antarctic Peninsula, from which Joinville Island group is separated by the Antarctic Sound.

== Location ==
Trinity Peninsula on Antarctic Peninsula. Joinville Island group to the north

The Joinville Island group lies in Graham Land to the east of the tip of Trinity Peninsula, which is itself the tip of the Antarctic Peninsula. It is separated from the mainland by the Antarctic Sound. Joinville Island is at the center of the group. Other islands and rocks include, clockwise from the west, Bransfield Island, D'Urville Island, Wideopen Islands, Brash Island, Danger Islands, Eden Rocks, Paulet Island, Dundee Island.

== Main islands ==
=== D'Urville Island ===
63°05′S 56°20′W. Northernmost island of the Joinville Island group, 17 nautical miles (31 km; 20 mi) long, lying immediately north of Joinville Island, from which it is separated by Larsen Channel. Charted in 1902 by the SwedAE under Otto Nordenskjöld, who named it for Captain Jules Dumont d'Urville, French explorer who discovered land in the Joinville Island group.

=== Joinville Island ===
63°15′S 55°45′W. Largest island of the Joinville Island group, about 40 nautical miles (74 km; 46 mi) long in an east–west direction and 12 nautical miles (22 km; 14 mi) wide, lying off the northeast tip of Antarctic Peninsula, from which it is separated by Antarctic Sound. Discovered and roughly charted in 1838 by a French expedition under Captain Jules Dumont d'Urville, who named it for François d'Orléans, Prince of Joinville (1818-1900), the third son of the Duc d'Orleans.

=== Dundee Island ===
63°30′S 55°55′W. Ice-covered island lying east of the northeast tip of Antarctic Peninsula and south of Joinville Island. Discovered on 8 January 1893 by Captain Thomas Robertson of the Active and named for the home port, Dundee, Scotland, from whence the ship sailed in company with three other vessels in search of whales.

== Straits ==
=== Antarctic Sound ===
63°20′S 56°45′W. Body of water about 30 nautical miles (56 km; 35 mi) long and from 7 to 12 nautical miles (13 to 22 km; 8.1 to 13.8 mi) wide, separating the Joinville Island group from the northeast end of the Antarctic Peninsula. The sound was named by the Swedish Antarctic Expedition (SwedAE) under Otto Nordenskjöld for the expedition ship Antarctic which in 1902, under the command of Captain C.A. Larsen, was the first vessel to navigate it.

=== Burden Passage ===
63°08′S 56°32′W. A marine passage between D'Urville Island and Bransfield Island. Charted in 1947 by the FIDS and named after Eugene Burden (1892-1979), who, as master of the Trepassey, first navigated the passage in January 1947.

=== Larsen Channel ===
63°10′S 56°12′W. A strait 1 to 3 nautical miles (1.9 to 5.6 km; 1.2 to 3.5 mi) wide between D'Urville Island and Joinville Island. Discovered in 1902 by the Swedish Antarctic Expedition under Nordenskjold, and named for Captain C.A. Larsen of the expedition ship Antarctic.

=== Firth of Tay ===
63°22′S 55°45′W. A sound, 12 nautical miles (22 km; 14 mi) long and 6 nautical miles (11 km; 6.9 mi) wide, extending in a northwest–southeast direction between the northeast side of Dundee Island and the east portion of Joinville Island. It merges to the northwest with Active Sound with which it completes the separation of Dundee and Joinville Islands. Discovered in 1892–93 by Captain Thomas Robertson of the Dundee whaling expedition and named by him after the Firth of Tay of Scotland.

=== Active Sound ===
63°25′S 56°10′W. A sound, averaging 2 nautical miles (3.7 km; 2.3 mi) wide, extending in an east-northeast direction from Antarctic Sound and joining the Firth of Tay with which it separates Joinville and Dundee Islands. Discovered in 1892-93 by Captain Thomas Robertson of the Dundee whaling expedition. Robertson named the feature after his ship, the Active, first vessel to navigate the sound.

== Smaller islands ==
Smaller islands, clockwise from the west, include:

=== Bransfield Island ===
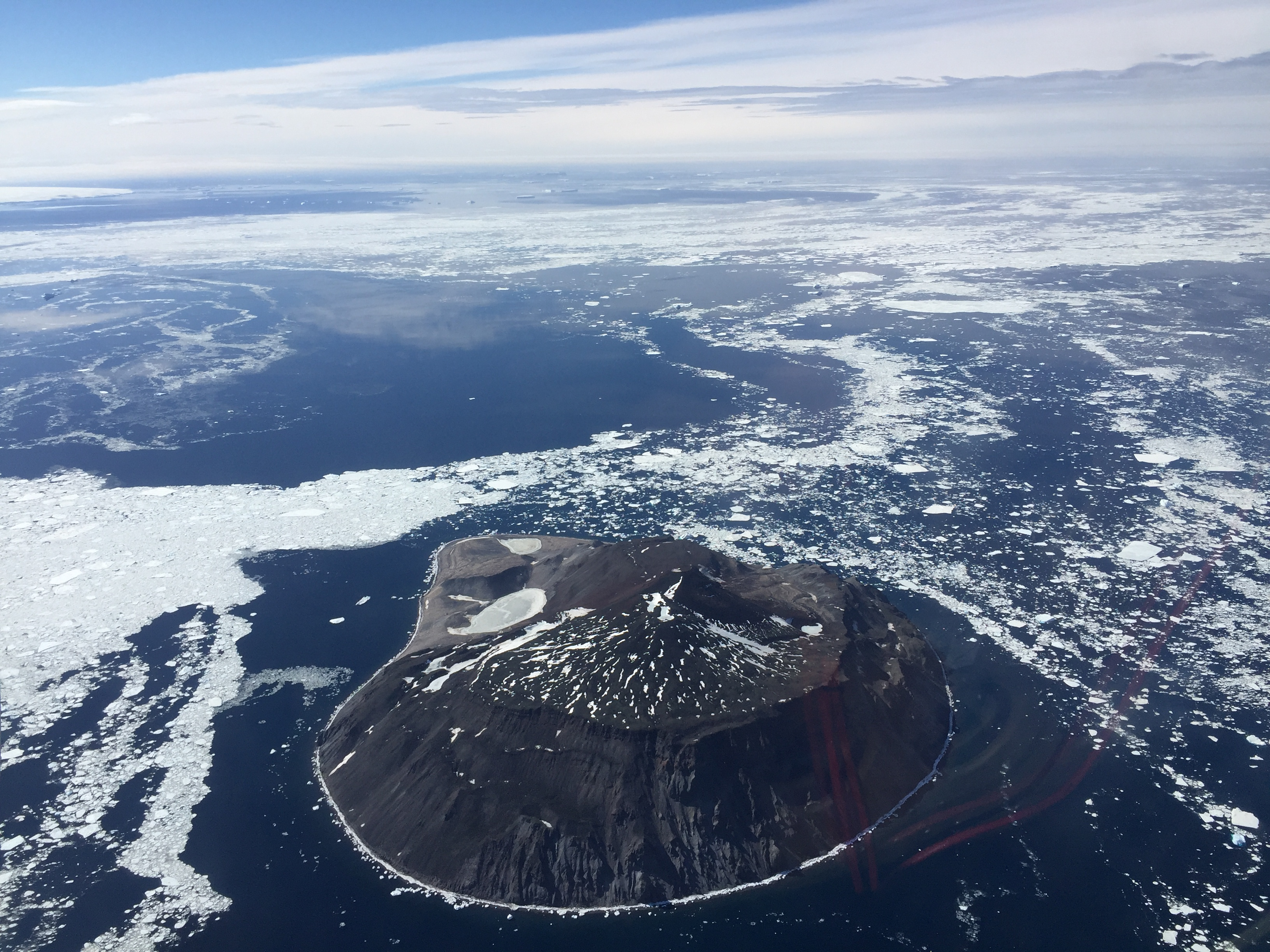
Bransfield Island, October 27, 2016

63°11′S 56°36′W. An island nearly 5 nautical miles (9.3 km; 5.8 mi) |long, lying 3 nautical miles (5.6 km; 3.5 mi) southwest of D'Urville Island. The name Point Bransfield, after Edward Bransfield, Master, Royal Navy, was given in 1842 by a British expedition under James Clark Ross to the low western termination of what is now the Joinville Island group. A 1947 survey by the FIDS determined that this western termination is a separate island.

=== Papua Island ===
63°07′S 55°57′W. A small circular island lying 4 nautical miles (7.4 km; 4.6 mi) west of Boreal Point, off the north coast of Joinville Island. The name was applied by the Argentine Antarctic Expedition (1953-54) because large numbers of gentoo penguins (Pygoscelis papua) were sighted on this island.

=== Wideopen Islands ===
63°00′S 55°49′W. A group of islands and rocks lying 7 nautical miles (13 km; 8.1 mi) north of Boreal Point, Joinville Island. Roughly surveyed from a distance by the FIDS in 1953-54. So named by the UK Antarctic Place-Names Committee (UK-APC) in 1958 because of their exposed, isolated position on the south side of Bransfield Strait.

=== Patella Island ===
63°08′S 55°29′W. A small but prominent island, more than 75 metres (246 ft) high, lying 2 nautical miles (3.7 km; 2.3 mi) northwest of Ambush Bay off the north coast of Joinville Island. Surveyed by the Falkland Islands Dependencies Survey (FIDS) in 1953. The name is descriptive of the island's shape; Patella is the Latin name for a limpet.

=== Etna Island ===
63°05′S 55°09′W. An island with a high summit, lying 6 nautical miles (11 km; 6.9 mi) north of the eastern end of Joinville Island. Discovered by a British expedition under James Clark Ross, 1839-43, who so named it because of its resemblance to volcanic Mount Etna.

=== Brash Island ===
63°24′S 54°55′W. An isolated island lying 5 nautical miles (9.3 km; 5.8 mi) northwest of Darwin Island, off the southeast end of Joinville Island. Surveyed by the FIDS in 1953. So named by the UK-APC because the island lies in an area where brash ice is frequently found.

=== Danger Islands ===
63°25′S 54°40′W. Group of islands lying 13 nautical miles (24 km; 15 mi) east-southeast of Joinville Island. Discovered on 28 December 1842 by a British expedition under James Clark Ross, who so named them because, appearing among heavy fragments of ice, they were almost completely concealed until the ship was nearly upon them.

=== Puget Rock ===
63°29′S 55°39′W. A rock lying east of Eden Rocks, off the east end of Dundee Island. The name Cape Puget was given by Sir James Clark Ross on 30 December 1842, for Captain William D. Puget, Royal Navy, but it is not clear from Ross' text what feature he was naming. The name Puget Rock was given by the UK Antarctic Place-Names Committee (UK-APC) in 1956 in order to preserve Ross' name in this vicinity.

=== Eden Rocks ===
63°29′S 55°40′W. Two rocks lying just off the east end of Dundee Island. A small island was reported here by Captain James Clark Ross, Royal Navy, on December 30,1842. He named it "Eden Island" for Captain Charles Eden, Royal Navy. Following survey by the Falkland Islands Dependencies Survey (FIDS) in 1953, it was reported that the feature consists of two rocks lying close together. The Eden Rocks are a designated Important Bird Area.

=== Paulet Island ===
63°35′S 55°47′W. A circular island about 1 nautical mile (1.9 km; 1.2 mi) in diameter, lying 3 nautical miles (5.6 km; 3.5 mi) southeast of Dundee Island. Discovered by a British expedition under Ross, 1839-43, and named by him for Captain the Right Honorable Lord George Paulet.

=== Rosamel Island ===
63°34′S 56°17′W. A circular island 1 nautical mile (1.9 km; 1.2 mi) in diameter with precipitous cliffs of volcanic rock rising to a snow-covered peak 435 metres (1,427 ft) high, lying west of Dundee Island in the south entrance to Antarctic Sound. Discovered by the French expedition, 1837-40, under Captain Jules Dumont d'Urville, and named by him for V. Admiral Claude de Rosamel, French Minister of Marine under whose orders the expedition sailed.

== Sources ==
- Alberts, Fred G., ed. (1995), Geographic Names of the Antarctic (PDF) (2 ed.), United States Board on Geographic Names This article incorporates public domain material from websites or documents of the United States Board on Geographic Names.
- "Eden Rocks", BirdLife data zone: Important Bird Areas, BirdLife International, 2012, archived from the original on 10 July 2007
- Graham Land and South Shetland Islands, BAS: British Antarctic Survey, 2005

This article incorporates public domain material from websites or documents of the United States Geological Survey.
