= Otto Nordenskjöld =

Swedish geologist, geographer, and polar explorer

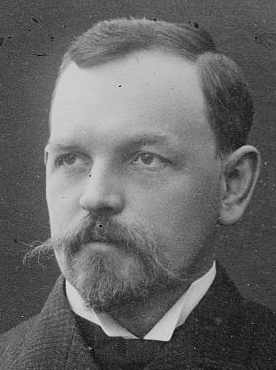
- Otto Nordenskjöld
- Born: 6 December 1869; Hässleby, Småland, Sweden
- Died: 2 June 1928 (aged 58); Gothenburg, Sweden
- Relatives: Adolf Erik Nordenskiöld (uncle); Gustaf Nordenskiöld (cousin)

Nils Otto Gustaf Nordenskjöld (6 December 1869 – 2 June 1928) was a Swedish geologist, geographer, and polar explorer.

== Early life ==
Nordenskjöld was born in Hässleby in Småland in eastern Sweden, in a family that included his maternal uncle, Finnish-born polar explorer Adolf Erik Nordenskiöld, and cousin Gustaf Nordenskiöld. His father and mother were cousins, but his father's family name was "Nordenskjöld", while his mother's family name was spelled "Nordenskiöld".

He studied at Uppsala University, obtaining a doctorate in geology in 1894, and later became a lecturer and then associate professor in the university's geology department.

== Career ==
Otto Nordenskjöld led mineralogical expeditions to Patagonia in the 1890s, and to Alaska and the Klondike area in 1898.

=== Antarctic Expedition ===
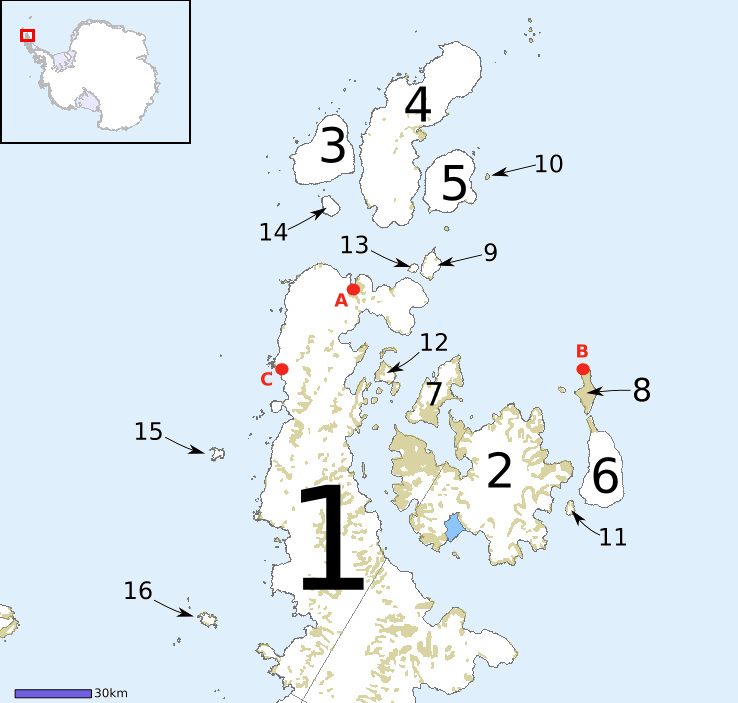
Peninsula tip (north on the left): 6 = Snow Hill I., 10 = Paulet I., A = Hope Bay

Nordenskjöld led the 1901–1904 Swedish Antarctic Expedition. Their ship Antarctic, commanded by the seasoned Antarctic sailor Carl Anton Larsen, visited Buenos Aires and the Falkland Islands before leaving Nordenskjöld's party at Snow Hill Island off the Antarctic Peninsula to overwinter, while the ship returned to the Falklands.

The following spring, early in November 1902, Larsen sailed south to retrieve the party, but the Antarctic became trapped in ice and so damaged it eventually sank on 12 February 1903, forcing the crew to winter in a hastily constructed shelter on Paulet Island. Larsen and Nordenskjöld finally rendezvoused at their fall-back rescue hut at Hope Bay in November 1903 and were soon picked up by the corvette ARA Uruguay (commanded by Julián Irízar), dispatched after Antarctic had failed to make its appointed return to Argentina.

Despite its end and the great hardships endured, the expedition was considered a scientific success, having explored much of the eastern coast of Graham Land, including Cape Longing, James Ross Island, the Joinville Island group, and the Palmer Archipelago, recovering also valuable geological samples and samples of marine animals. It earned Nordenskjöld lasting fame at home, but its huge cost left him greatly in debt.

== Later life ==
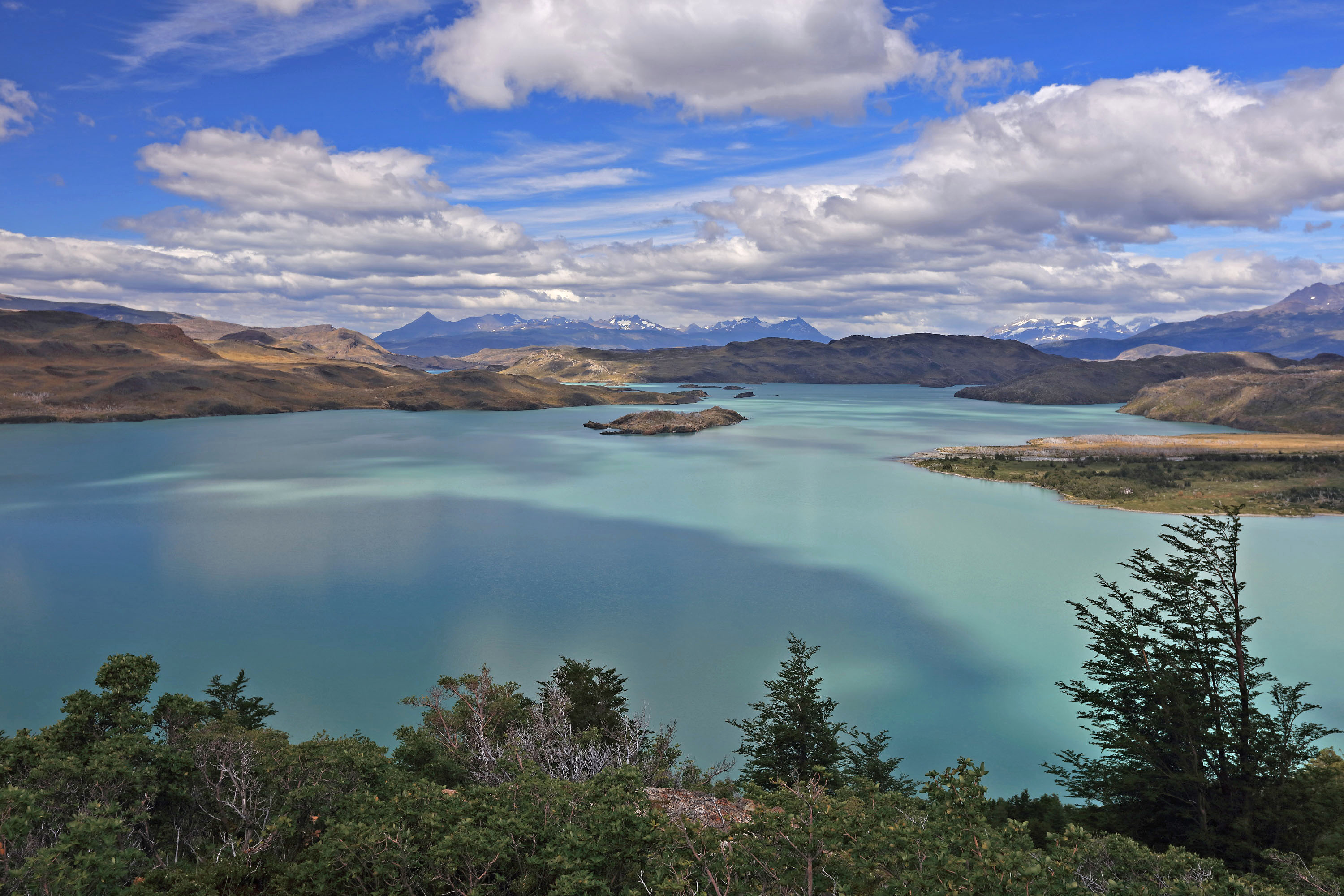
Lago Nordenskjöld in southern Chile.

In 1905, Nordenskjöld was appointed professor of geography (with commercial geography) and ethnography at University of Gothenburg.

Nordenskjöld later explored Greenland in 1909 and returned to South America to explore Chile and Peru in the early 1920s (many samples from this expedition are now displayed at the Natural History Museum in Lima). He also studied the effects of winter on alpine climate, and developed a formula for identifying the boundaries of the Arctic region based on the temperatures in the warmest and coldest months of the year.

Nordenskjöld was killed in a traffic collision at the age of 58 when he was hit by a bus driver in Gothenburg, where he was also buried.

== Legacy ==
A number of geographical features have been named after Otto Nordenskiöld, including:

- Nordenskjöld Lake, an pre-andean lake in Chile's Torres del Paine National Park
- Nordenskjöld Coast, a section of the coast of the east side of the Antarctic Peninsula
- Nordenskjöld Basin, an undersea basin
- Nordenskjöld Ice Tongue, a glacial ice tongue extending over the Ross Sea
- Nordenskjöld Glacier, a glacier on South Georgia
- Nordenskjöld Outcrops, rocky outcrops on the Antarctic Peninsula
- Nordenskjöld Peak, a mountain on South Georgia

== Publications ==
- Antarctica: Or, Two years amongst the ice of the South Pole ISBN 0-208-01642-2
- S A Duse (1905), Bland pingvinar ock sälar, minnen från Svenska sydpolarexpeditionen 1901-03.
