= Coupvent Point =

Headland in Antarctica

- Location within Antarctica

Geography
- Coordinates: 63°16′S 57°36′W

Coupvent Point (63°16′S 57°36′W) is a point, with several off-lying rocks, projecting north from Trinity Peninsula, 5 nautical miles (9.3 km; 5.8 mi) southwest of Lafarge Rocks.

== Location ==
Trinity Peninsula, Antarctic Peninsula. Coupvent Point towards northeast end

Coupvent Point is near the east end of the north shore of Trinity Peninsula, which itself is the tip of the Antarctic Peninsula. It faces the Bransfield Strait. It is east of the Duroch Islands and Schmidt Peninsula, north of the Mott Snowfield and west of Caleta Thornton and Prime Head. Nomad Rock, Lafarge Rocks and Casy Island are north of the point.

== Name ==
The name "Roche Coupvent" (Coupvent Rock) was given by Captain Jules Dumont d'Urville to a feature in the vicinity. The present name revives the d'Urville naming, given for Aimé Coupvent-Desbois, an officer on the Zélée and later the Astrolabe.

== Nearby features ==
Nearby features, from west to east, include:

=== Kevin Islands ===
63°17′S 57°44′W. A cluster of small islands and rocks which lie close to the northern coast of Trinity Peninsula, midway between Halpern Point and Coupvent Point. Named by US-ACAN for Kevin M. Scott, member of geological party from the University of Wisconsin (USARP), who carried out independent studies in Gerlache Strait, 1961-62.

=== Nomad Rock ===
63°13′S 57°42′W. An isolated rock in Bransfield Strait, 5 nautical miles (9.3 km; 5.8 mi) off the north coast of Trinity Peninsula and 9 nautical miles (17 km; 10 mi) northeast of Cape Legoupil. So named by UK-APC because of confusion about the identity of geographic points along this coast, and because of the wandering of features and names on charts of this vicinity.

=== Lafarge Rocks ===
63°13′S 57°33′W. One large and several smaller rocks lying 2 nautical miles (3.7 km; 2.3 mi) northwest of Casy Island and 7 nautical miles (13 km; 8.1 mi) west of Prime Head, the north tip of Antarctic Peninsula. Discovered by a French expedition, 1837–40, under Captain Jules Dumont d'Urville, and named by him for Ensign Antoine Pavin de la Farge of the expedition ship Zélée. They were recharted by the FIDS in 1946.

=== Casy Island ===
63°14′S 57°30′W. The largest feature in a group of small islands lying 2 nautical miles (3.7 km; 2.3 mi) southeast of Lafarge Rocks and 3 nautical miles (5.6 km; 3.5 mi) northeast of Coupvent Point. Discovered and named by a French expedition under Captain Jules Dumont d'Urville, 1837-40.

=== Caleta Thornton ===
63.26667°S 57.46667°W. A cove located about 5 nautical miles (9.3 km; 5.8 mi) southwest of Prime Head. The name corresponds to the surname of 1st Lieutenant George Thornton M., of the AGS. "Yelcho" of the Chilean Navy, who participated in the Antarctic hydrographic work carried out by the Chilean Antarctic Expedition of 1971. It is called Caleta Mercado by Argentina.

== Sources ==
- Alberts, Fred G., ed. (1995), Geographic Names of the Antarctic (PDF) (2 ed.), United States Board on Geographic Names This article incorporates public domain material from websites or documents of the United States Board on Geographic Names.
- "Caleta Thornton", Composite Gazetteer of Antarctica (in Spanish), Scientific Committee on Antarctic Research
- Graham Land and South Shetland Islands, BAS: British Antarctic Survey, 2005
- Trinity Peninsula (PDF) (Scale 1:250000 topographic map No. 5697), Institut für Angewandte Geodäsie and British Antarctic Survey, 1996, archived from the original (PDF) on 23 September 2015

This article incorporates public domain material from websites or documents of the United States Geological Survey.
