= Astrolabe Island =

Island in Graham Land, Antarctica

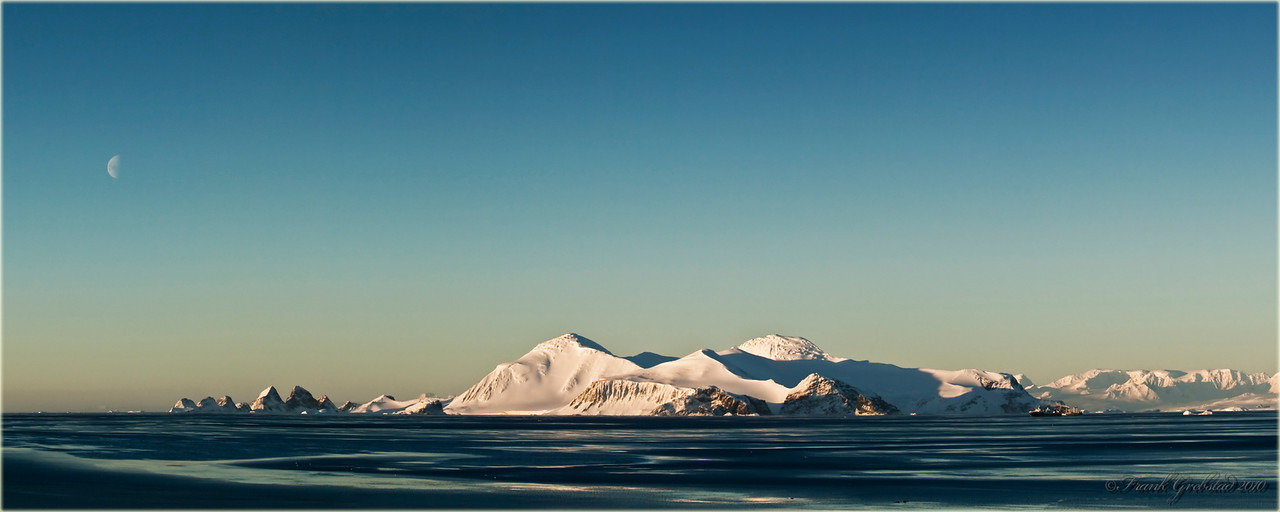
- Astrolabe Island from northwest, with the Dragons Teeth on the left, and Drumohar Peak and Rogach Peak dominating the island.

- Location of Astrolabe Island

- Location in Antarctica

Geography
- Location: Antarctica
- Coordinates: 63°17′S 58°40′W

Astrolabe Island (63°17′S 58°40′W) is an island 3 nautical miles (5.6 km; 3.5 mi) long, lying in the Bransfield Strait 14 nautical miles (26 km; 16 mi) northwest of Cape Ducorps, Trinity Peninsula in Antarctica.

== Location ==
Astrolabe Island is in Graham Land. It lies in the Bransfield Strait to the west-northwest of the Tupinier Islands and the Cockerell Peninsula on the north coast of the Trinity Peninsula, which itself is the tip of the Antarctic Peninsula. Features include Sherell Point, Diaz Rock and the Dragons Teeth.

== Geology ==
Astrolabe Island is predominantly volcanic rocks, with coarse grained mafic dolerite making up most of the landing site on the east end. The steep pyramid peaks, called the Dragons Teeth, may be the vents of an old volcanic complex, probably related to the Shetland subduction zone to the north.

== Sailing directions ==
The US Defense Mapping Agency's Sailing Directions for Antarctica (1976) describes Astrolabe Island as follows:

Astrolabe Island, about 1,850 feet high, lies about 9 miles from the coast and about 19 miles southwestward of Montravel Rock. It is about 3 miles long from east to west and about 2 miles wide. There is a bay on the northern side of the island, but it has not been investigated. The shores of Astrolabe Island are foul close-to. A foul area extends from the northwestern extremity of the island for a distance of about 1 mile in a northerly direction, and the foul area is charted continuing to a point about 2 1/2 miles northward of the island. An above-water rock lies approximately 2 miles west-northwest of the northwestern extremity of the island.

A group of three islets, surrounded by foul ground, lies with the westernmost of the group in a position about 3 1/2 miles east-southeastward of the eastern extremity of Astrolabe Island. A depth of 10 fathoms is charted about 1 1/2 miles westward of the westernmost islet. A rock, awash, is charted about 8 miles southwestward of the western end of Astrolabe Island.

== Discovery and name ==
Astrolabe Island was discovered by the French expedition, 1837–40, under Captain Jules Dumont d'Urville, and named by him for his chief expedition ship, the Astrolabe. The island was photographed from the air and triangulated by the Falkland Islands and Dependencies Aerial Survey Expedition (FIDASE) in 1956–57.

== Coastal features ==
Coastal features include, clockwise from the north:

=== Kanarata Point ===
63°17′16.3″S 58°40′42″W. A rocky point in northeastern Astrolabe Island forming the north extremity of the island surmounted by Dragons Teeth. Situated 3.95 kilometres (2.45 mi) northeast of Raduil Point and 2.17 kilometres (1.35 mi) north of Drumohar Peak. Named after Kanarata Peak in Rila Mountain, Bulgaria.

=== Velcha Cove ===
63°18′37″S 58°39′53″W. A 400 metres (1,300 ft) wide cove indenting the east coast of Astrolabe Island by 680 metres (2,230 ft). Centred 2.6 kilometres (1.6 mi) southeast of Kanarata Point, 700 metres (2,300 ft) southwest of Papazov Island and 3.3 kilometres (2.1 mi) northeast of Sherrell Point. Surmounted by Drumohar Peak on the northwest and Rogach Peak on the south. Named after Velcha Peak in Eastern Balkan Mountains.

=== Gega Point ===
63°19′39″S 58°42′22″W. A point on the west coast of Astrolabe Island. Situated 1.15 kilometres (0.71 mi) northwest of Sherrell Point and 3.35 kilometres (2.08 mi) southeast of Raduil Point. Forming the southeast side of the entrance to Mokren Bight. Named after the settlement of Gega in Southwestern Bulgaria.

=== Mokren Bight ===
63°19′14″S 58°43′08″W. A 2 kilometres (1.2 mi) wide embayment indenting the west coast of Astrolabe Island for 850 metres (2,790 ft). Entered north of Gega Point. Named after the settlement of Mokren in Southeastern Bulgaria.

=== Damga Point ===
63°19′04″S 58°44′29″W. A sharp rocky northwest entrance point of Mokren Bight on the west coast of Astrolabe Island. Situated 1.58 kilometres (0.98 mi) south of Raduil Point, 1.2 kilometres (0.75 mi) southwest of Petleshkov Hill and 3.1 kilometres (1.9 mi) northwest of Sherrell Point. Named after Damga Peak in Rila Mountain, Bulgaria.

=== Raduil Point ===
63.30389°S 58.74861°W. The point forming the northwest extremity of Astrolabe Island. Situated 4.5 kilometres (2.8 mi) northwest of Sherrell Point. Named after the settlement of Raduil in Southwestern Bulgaria.

=== Sherrell Point ===
63°18′S 58°41′W. A point at the south end of Astrolabe Island. Named for Frederick W. Sherrell, surveyor and geologist in this area with the Falkland Islands and Dependencies Aerial Survey Expedition (FIDASE), 1955-56.

== Inland features ==
Inland features, from west to east, include:

=== Petleshkov Hill ===
63°18′35″S 58°43′30″W. An ice-covered hill rising to 381 metres (1,250 ft) high in northwestern Astrolabe Island. Situated 1.2 kilometres (0.75 mi) northeast of Damga Point, 1.32 kilometres (0.82 mi) southeast of Raduil Point and 2.15 kilometres (1.34 mi) west of Drumohar Peak. Surmounts Mokren Bight to the south. Named after Vasil Petleshkov (1845-1876), a leader of the 1876 April Uprising for Bulgarian independence, in connection with the settlement of Petleshkovo in Northeastern Bulgaria.

=== Drumohar Peak ===
63°18′26″S 58°40′55″W. The ice-covered peak rising to 437 metres (1,434 ft) high on Astrolabe Island in Graham Land. Situated 3.15 kilometres (1.96 mi) east-northeast of Raduil Point and 1.9 kilometres (1.2 mi) north-northwest of Rogach Peak. German-British mapping in 1996. Named after the settlement of Drumohar in Western Bulgaria.

=== Rogach Peak ===
63°19′19″S 58°39′45″W. The ice-covered peak rising to Raduil Point 562 metres (1,844 ft) high on Astrolabe Island, summit of the island. Situated 2.28 kilometres (1.42 mi) northeast of Sherell Point and 1.9 kilometres (1.2 mi) south-southeast of Drumohar Peak. German-British mapping in 1996. Named after the settlement of Rogach in Southern Bulgaria.

== Nearby islands ==
Nearby rocks and islands include, clockwise from the north,

=== Dragons Teeth ===
63.25°S 58.65°W. A small group of rocks off the northeast part of Astrolabe Island. The name, applied by the UK Antarctic Place-Names Committee (UK-APC), is descriptive of these black tooth-shaped rocks.

=== Polich Island ===
63°17′17″S 58°40′29″W. A rocky island lying off the northeast coast of Astrolabe Island, 250 metres (820 ft) long in a southeast–northwest direction and 100 metres (330 ft) wide. Situated 90 metres (300 ft) northeast of Kanarata Point, 460 metres (1,510 ft) north-northwest of Sagita Island and 2.08 kilometres (1.29 mi) north-northeast of Drumohar Peak. Named after Golyam Polich and Malak Polich Peaks in Rila Mountain, Bulgaria.

=== Sagita Island ===
63°17′35″S 58°40′00″W. A rocky island lying off the northeast coast of Astrolabe Island, 280 metres (920 ft) long in a southwest–northeast direction and 180 metres (590 ft) wide. Situated 710 metres (2,330 ft) southeast of Kanarata Point and 1.64 kilometres (1.02 mi) northeast of Drumohar Peak. Named after the ocean fishing trawler Sagita of the Bulgarian company Ocean Fisheries – Burgas that operated in Antarctic waters off South Georgia during its fishing trips under Captain Ivan Krastanov from February 1978 to July 1978, and under Captain Yordan Yordanov from December 1979 to June 1980. Apart from fishing, on the latter occasion the ship carried out fisheries research by an onboard scientific team.

=== Papazov Island ===
63°18′19″S 58°39′12″W. A rocky island lying off the entrance to Velcha Cove on the east coast of Astrolabe Island, 200 metres (660 ft) long in a west.southwest – east-northeast direction and 100 metres (330 ft) wide. Situated 2.27 kilometres (1.41 mi) southeast of Kanarata Point and 1.4 kilometres (0.87 mi) east of Drumohar Peak. Named after the Bulgarian-French artist George Papazov (1894-1972).

=== Diaz Rock ===
63°18′S 58°45′W. The largest of several rocks close north of the west end of Astrolabe Island. The name was given by the first Chilean Antarctic Expedition (1947) for sub-lieutenant Joaquin Diaz Martinez.

== Sources ==
- Alberts, Fred G., ed. (1995), Geographic Names of the Antarctic (PDF) (2 ed.), United States Board on Geographic Names This article incorporates public domain material from websites or documents of the United States Board on Geographic Names.
- "Damga Point", Composite Gazetteer of Antarctica, Scientific Committee on Antarctic Research
- "Drumohar Peak", Composite Gazetteer of Antarctica, Scientific Committee on Antarctic Research
- "Gega Point", Composite Gazetteer of Antarctica, Scientific Committee on Antarctic Research
- Graham Land and South Shetland Islands, BAS: British Antarctic Survey, 2005
- "Kanarata Point", Composite Gazetteer of Antarctica, Scientific Committee on Antarctic Research
- "Mokren Bight", Composite Gazetteer of Antarctica, Scientific Committee on Antarctic Research
- "Papazov Island", Composite Gazetteer of Antarctica, Scientific Committee on Antarctic Research
- "Petleshkov Hill", Composite Gazetteer of Antarctica, Scientific Committee on Antarctic Research
- "Polich Island", Composite Gazetteer of Antarctica, Scientific Committee on Antarctic Research
- "Raduil Point", Composite Gazetteer of Antarctica, Scientific Committee on Antarctic Research
- "Rogach Peak", Composite Gazetteer of Antarctica, Scientific Committee on Antarctic Research
- "Sagita Island", Composite Gazetteer of Antarctica, Scientific Committee on Antarctic Research
- Sailing Directions for Antarctica: Includes Islands South of Latitude 60.̊, United States. Defense Mapping Agency. Hydrographic Center, 1976 This article incorporates public domain material from websites or documents of the National Geospatial-Intelligence Agency.
- Trinity Peninsula (PDF) (Scale 1:250000 topographic map No. 5697), Institut für Angewandte Geodäsie and British Antarctic Survey, 1996, archived from the original (PDF) on 23 September 2015
- "Velcha Cove", Composite Gazetteer of Antarctica, Scientific Committee on Antarctic Research

This article incorporates public domain material from websites or documents of the United States Geological Survey.
