= General Jorge Boonen Rivera Base =

General Jorge Boonen Rivera Base Refugio General Jorge Boonen Rivera General Ramon Cans Montalva Base Station V (until 1996)
- Antarctic refuge
- Location in Antarctica
- Coordinates: 63°32′18″S 57°24′27″W
- Region: Antarctic Peninsula
- Location: View Point
- Established: 01:00, 3 June 1953
- Transferred: 29 August 1996
- Named for: Jorge Boonen

Government
  - Type: Administration
  - Body: Chilean Army

Population
  - Total: 0
- Time zone: UTC-3
- Active times: Summer

General Jorge Boonen Rivera Base (formally General Ramon Cañas Montalva) is a small Chilean shelter located in Duse Bay, Trinity Peninsula, Antarctic Peninsula. It is administered by the Chilean Army.

== Description ==
The base is a cabin with a machine house, bathroom and storage. It is located about 50 km away from another Chilean base, Base General Bernardo O'Higgins Riquelme on which it heavily depends. Currently the installation is regularly maintained by Chile, for use as an emergency shelter, allowing 8 people to survive in it for 20 days in the event of an accident. For this purpose, the station has an electric generator, as well as fuel, food, water and gas.

== History ==
It was initially named "Station V - View Point" as given by the British Antarctic Survey when they established the site as a satellite on 3 June 1953.

Between its opening in 1953 and 25 November 1963, it operated intermittently, always under the British administration, which assigned it to meteorological and geological investigations. As part of a plan to remove or transfer abandoned facilities, in compliance with the Antarctic Treaty, on 29 July 1996, Station V was transferred to Chile, which renamed it to General Ramon Cañas Montalva and then later to its current name.

In September 2005 three soldiers of the Chilean Army died in the vicinity of this shelter, when their snow vehicle fell into a crack.
