= German Antarctic Receiving Station =

German receiving station in Antarctica

Coordinates: 63°19′15″S 57°54′03″W

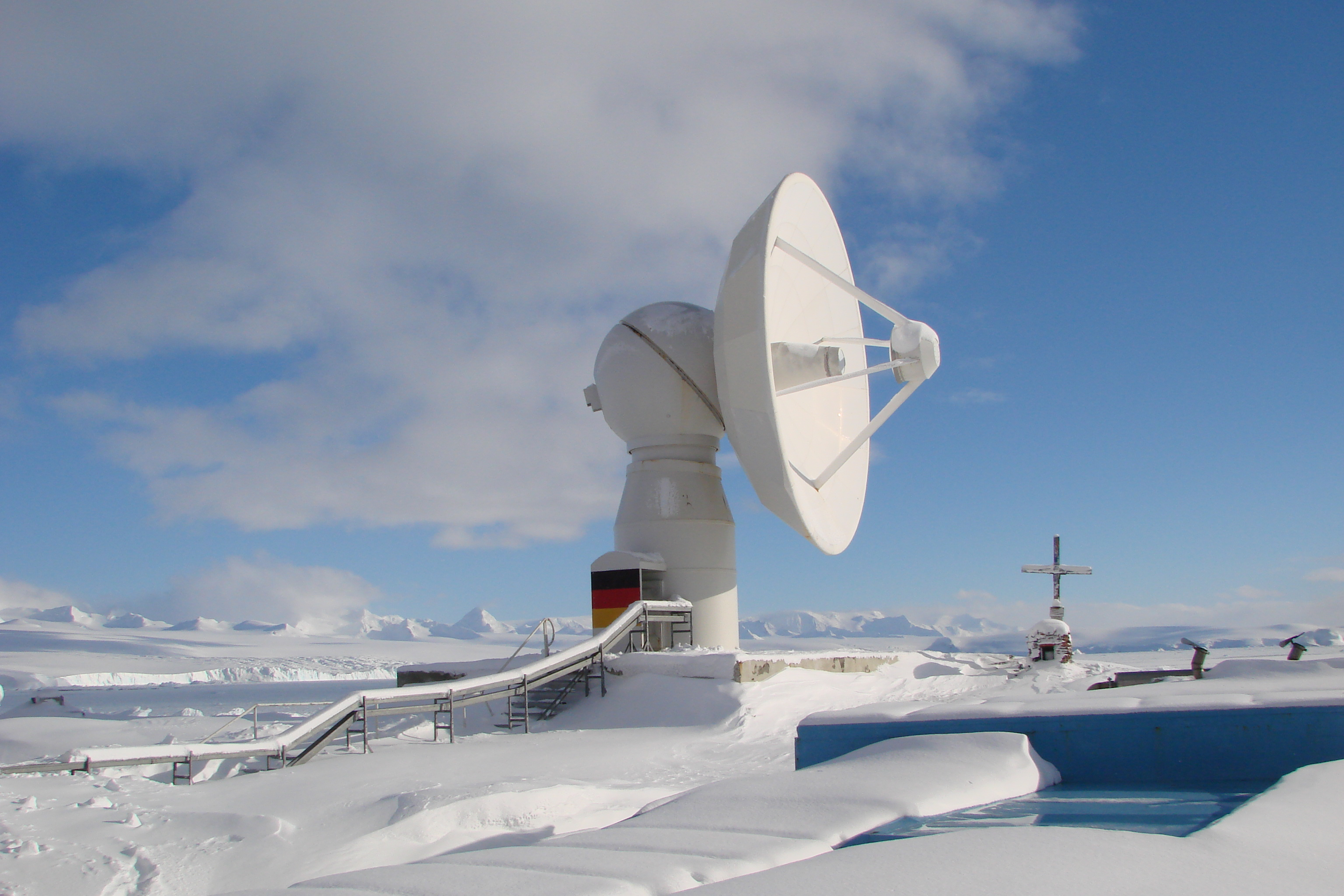
German Antarctic Receiving Station

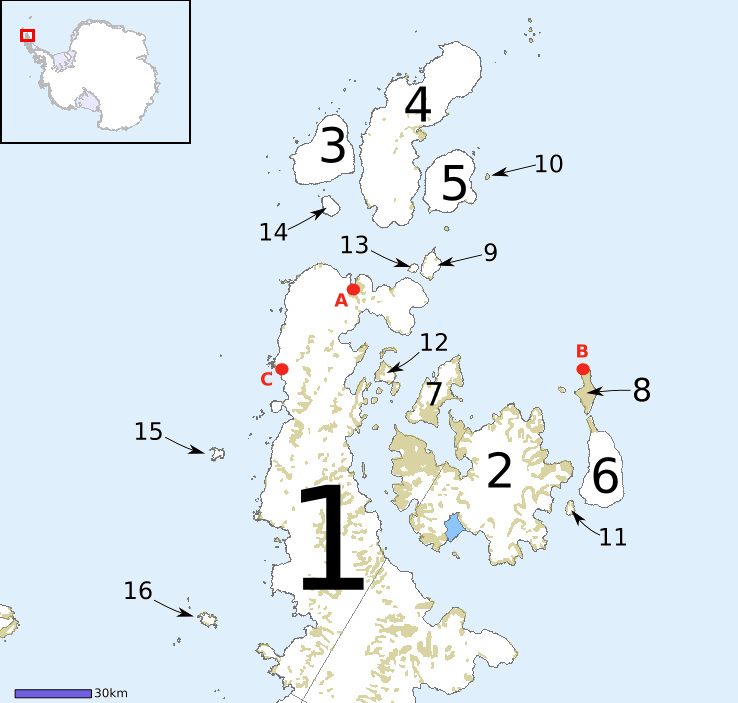
Location of the GARS O'Higgins research station (point C) at the northern end of the Antarctic Peninsula (area 1)

German Antarctic Receiving Station or GARS O'Higgins is a German polar research station in Antarctica.

It is located at Cape Legoupil on the Antarctic Peninsula on the six-hectare Isabel Riquelme islet, also known as Schmidt Peninsula. The islet is 300 m wide and 200 m long, 50 m from the mainland, with a land connection at low tide.

The station stands on rock suitable for geodetic long-term observations. The living, sleeping and working rooms of the campaign teams, as well as most of the station's equipment, are located in a main station building consisting of fifteen 20-foot ISO containers, and an infrastructure complex consisting of twenty 20-foot ISO containers.

== Operations and responsibilities ==
The station is operated by the German Aerospace Center (DLR) and the Federal Agency for Cartography and Geodesy (BKG) in close cooperation with Chile. Campaign teams have been on site all year round since the beginning of 2010. A maximum of ten scientists, engineers and technicians work in the station. DLR owns the station and is responsible for satellite operations, management, infrastructure and logistics. All logistical activities are coordinated between DLR and the Instituto Antártico Chileno (INACH). BKG is responsible for all geodetic observations.

== Choice of location ==
The station is named after the Chilean freedom fighter Bernardo O'Higgins. It was built in 1990/91 next to the Chilean Base General Bernardo O'Higgins Riquelme, which is operated by the Departamento Antártico del Ejército (DAE). The location was chosen for various reasons, including a cooperation agreement with INACH, favorable geological conditions for a radio telescope, the intended satellite visibility for reception of various sensor data from the European earth observation satellites ERS-1 and ERS-2 in the Antarctic area, and the existing Chilean infrastructure and logistics.

== Accessibility and logistics ==
As part of the long-standing cooperation with Chile, DLR and BKG can rely on Chilean Antarctic infrastructure and polar logistics. This makes the station accessible from Punta Arenas via King George Island by ship, plane and helicopter. The provision of flights by the Brazilian Antarctic Program (PROANTAR) is also logistically very important.

=== By air ===
O'Higgins (ICAO code: SCBO) can be reached all year round using special polar planes. If necessary, a 1000 m long runway is prepared 3 km south-east of the station on a glacier and can be approached from King George Island by a DHC-6 Twin Otter with skids of the Chilean Air Force (FACh). The preparation of the runway and the Ski-Doo transfer of people and cargo to and from the runway is carried out by the Chilean Army team from the General Bernardo O'Higgins station. In exceptional cases, FACh also uses a Bell 412 helicopter in between King George Island and the Schmidt Peninsula. King George Island, specifically the Chilean airfield Teniente Rodolfo Marsh Martin (ICAO code: SCRM), is served from Punta Arenas several times throughout the year by Hercules C-130 transport aircraft from FACh, the Brazilian Air Force (FAB) and the Uruguayan Air Force (FAU). FAB flies on this route on behalf of PROANTAR and FAU on behalf of the Uruguayan Antarctic Institute (IAU). During the southern summer, the private airline Aerovías DAP also operates commercial flights between Punta Arenas and King George Island.

=== By water ===
Ships also reach O'Higgins during the southern summer depending on the sea ice and iceberg situation. In particular, the Chilean Navy uses the ships ATF Lautaro and Almirante Oscar Viel to supply the station with marine diesel oil (MDO), transport containers and general cargo to and from the station, and sometimes exchange personnel. Due to the shallow water around the Schmidt Peninsula, ships cannot dock directly at the pier. If the sea allows it, people and smaller cargo are transported between ship and station by inflatable boats. For the same reason, containers are brought to and from the station by self-propelled barge from the Almirante Oscar Viel. The Almirante Oscar Viel can also fly people and small cargo to and from the ship using an MBB Bo 105 helicopter, often necessary when sea ice conditions prevent the use of inflatable boats.

== Research ==
=== Scientific equipment ===
The main scientific instrument of the station is a 9-meter antenna designed for use in extreme Antarctic conditions such as storms with peak winds of up to 180 km/h. It is used both for receiving satellite data and commanding satellites and as a radio telescope. It was installed in the southern summer of 1990/91, and the first experiments were carried out in 1991. The station also has permanent GPS, GLONASS and GALILEO reference stations, a pressure level, a radar level, and two weather stations. Absolute, GPS-referenced sea level data is obtained through the radar level. Absolute gravimetric measurements were carried out repeatedly. The weather stations permanently record meteorological readings such as temperature, relative humidity, air pressure, wind direction and wind speed.

=== Satellite operations and Earth observation ===
From 1991 until its mission ended on July 4, 2011, the station received SAR data and other sensor data from the European earth observation satellites ERS-1 and ERS-2. Since 2007, the station has supported the operation of the SAR satellite TSX as part of the German earth observation mission TerraSAR-X. With the launch of the almost identical SAR twin satellite TDX on June 21, 2010, the station assumed a decisive role in the implementation of the German TanDEM-X mission. The station covers a large part of the data reception and enables the monitoring and commanding of the satellites TSX and TDX, which form the satellite-based radar interferometer TanDEM-X. The station is becoming increasingly important for the GRACE and GRACE-FO mission, which DLR and NASA agreed in 2010 to continue until 2015. It will also receive downlinked data from SMILE, a joint mission between the European Space Agency and the Chinese Academy of Sciences to provide the first global images of the Earth's magnetosphere.

=== Geodesy and astrometry ===
The 9-meter antenna is used as a radio telescope to receive signals from radio stars and for geodetic VLBI observations. As such, the station is the network component of the International VLBI Service (IVS), providing precise data on continental drift and determining the achievable accuracy for the realization of the International Celestial Reference System (ICRS) and the derivation of the Earth's rotation parameters (ERP). The station is uniquely located on the Antarctic Peninsula for radio astrometry. The TANAMI project (Tracking Active Galactic Nuclei with Austral Milliarcsecond Interferometry) demonstrated this by observing black holes in the centers of distant galaxies that are millions to billions of times heavier than the Sun. Using the radio telescope in the station, a new VLBI image of the Centaurus A jet has successfully imaged structures just 0.04 light-years in size, a new record in extragalactic black hole exploration.
