= Gourdin =

Gourdin is a family name of French origin. Notable people with the surname include:

- Edward Gourdin (1897–1966), American athlete and jurist
- Noel Gourdin (born 1981), American musician
- Theodore Gourdin (1764–1826), American politician

== See also ==
- Gourdin Island, Antarctica
