= Ami Boué =

French geologist (1794–1881)

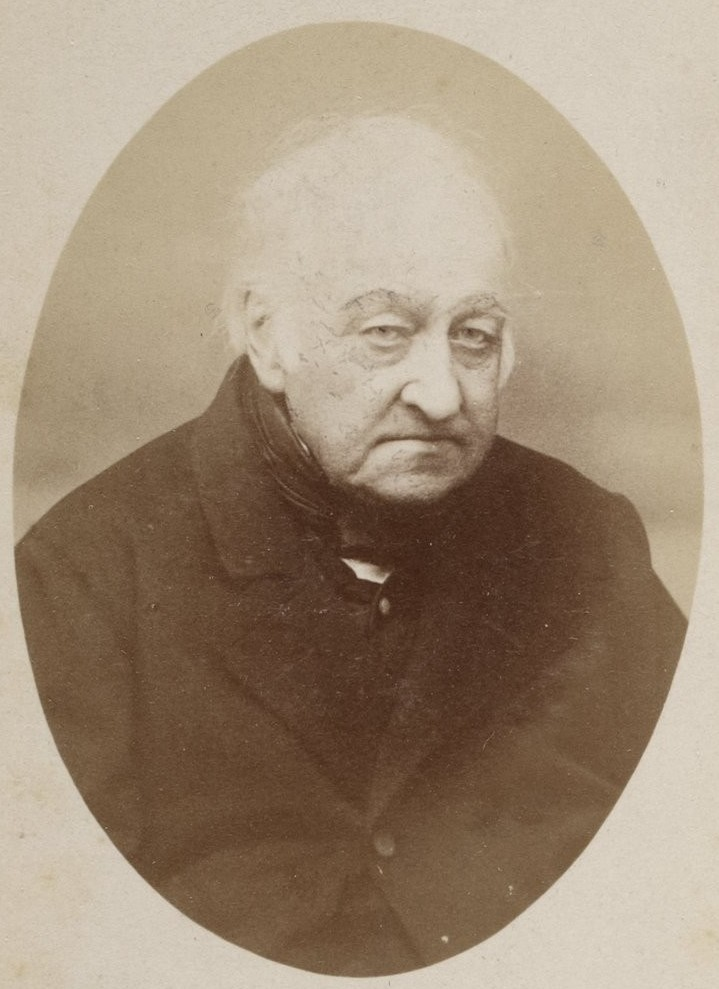
- Ami Boué, 1880
- Born: 16 March 1794; Hamburg, Holy Roman Empire
- Died: 21 November 1881 (aged 87); Vienna, Austria-Hungary
- Resting place: Bad Vöslau
- Citizenship: Austrian Empire
- Education: University of Edinburgh (M. D.)
- Spouse: Eleonore Beinstingel (m. 1826)
- Parent(s): Jean Henri Boué (father); Suzanne Chapeaurouge (mother)
- Awards: Wollaston Medal (1847)
- Scientific career
- Fields: geology

Ami Boué (16 March 1794 – 21 November 1881) was a geologist of French Huguenot origin. Born at Hamburg, he was trained in Edinburgh and across Europe. Based on fossil and the strata in which he observed them, he suggested that there were continuous change in the animal forms that existed over time and opposed the theories of catastrophism of the period. He travelled across Europe, studying geology, as well as ethnology, and is considered to be among the first to produce a geological map of the world.

== Career ==
Boué was born in Hamburg where his grandfather Jacques Chapeaurouge had settled in 1705 and established a shipping company which grew. Born in a wealthy home, Boué studied in Hamburg and Geneva before going to study medicine at Edinburgh from 1814 to 1817. Here he came under the influence of Robert Jameson, whose teachings in geology and mineralogy inspired his future career. Boué was thus led to make geological expeditions to various parts of Scotland and the Hebrides, and after taking his degree of M.D. in 1817 he settled for some years in Paris.

In 1820 he issued his Essai géologique sur l'Écosse, in which the eruptive rocks in particular were carefully described. He travelled much in Germany, Austria and southern Europe, studying various geological formations, and becoming one of the pioneers in geological research; he was one of the founders of the Société Géologique de France in 1830, and was its president in 1835. Boué married Eleonore Beinstingel in 1826 and lived for sometime in Berne and then at Vöslau. In 1837 he wrote an anonymous note in the Edinburgh New Philosophical Journal an article titled “Of the Changes Which Life Has Experienced on the Globe” in which he noted the fossil record by strata and argued against theories that involved catastrophism and special forms of creationism. In a French paper in 1834, he however accepted transmutation of species as suggested by Lamarck and Geoffroy. He also noted the role of climate change and other natural causes in extinction. In his 1836 book Guide du Géologue-Voyageur, sur le modéle de l’agenda geognostica, he emphasized uniformitarianism and the idea that most transmutations or changes were gradual and with only occasional cataclysmic change. He suggested that sudden changes would leave little chance for species to adapt. In 1841 he settled in Vienna, and became naturalized as an Austrian.

To the Imperial Academy of Sciences at Vienna he communicated important papers on the geology of the Balkan States (1859–1870), and he also published Mémoires géologiques et paléontologiques (Paris, 1832) and La Turquie d'Europe; observations sur la geographie, la géologie, l'histoire naturelle, etc. (Paris, 1840). This work was published in German under the title -- Die europäische T'ürkei—in 1890.

He was a correspondent of the Serbian Learned Society. In 1849 he published the first ethnological map of the Balkan Peninsula.

He is buried in a crypt in the Vöslau cemetery.

He was supportive of spontaneous generation and argued that spontaneously generated organisms existed at the microscopic level between animals and plants.

== Honours ==
Ami Boué Bluff on Graham Land in Antarctica and streets in Budapest, Varna, Vienna and Sofia are named after him.

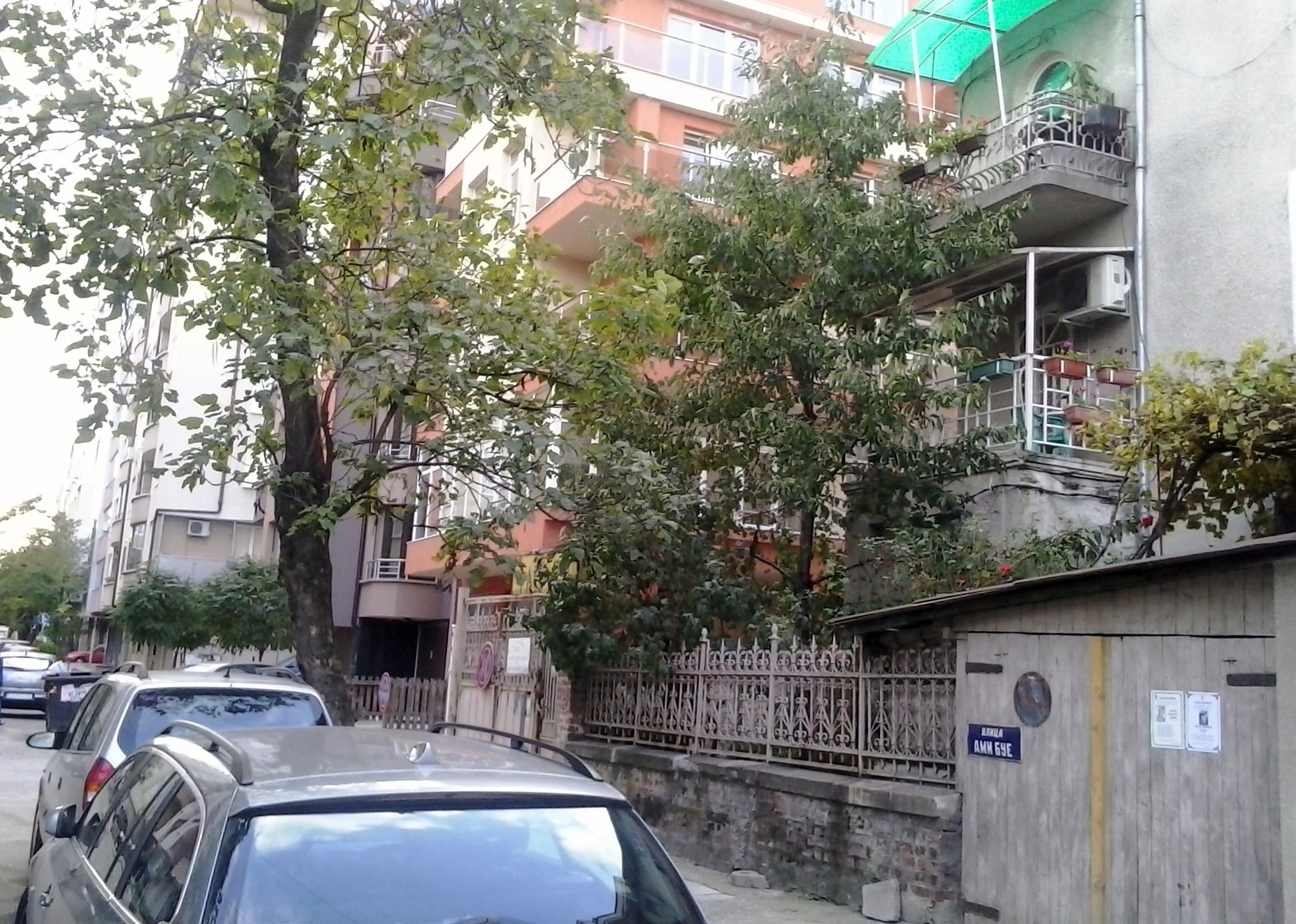
A view of Ami Boué Street in Sofia, Bulgaria (42°41.153′N 23°17.999′E)

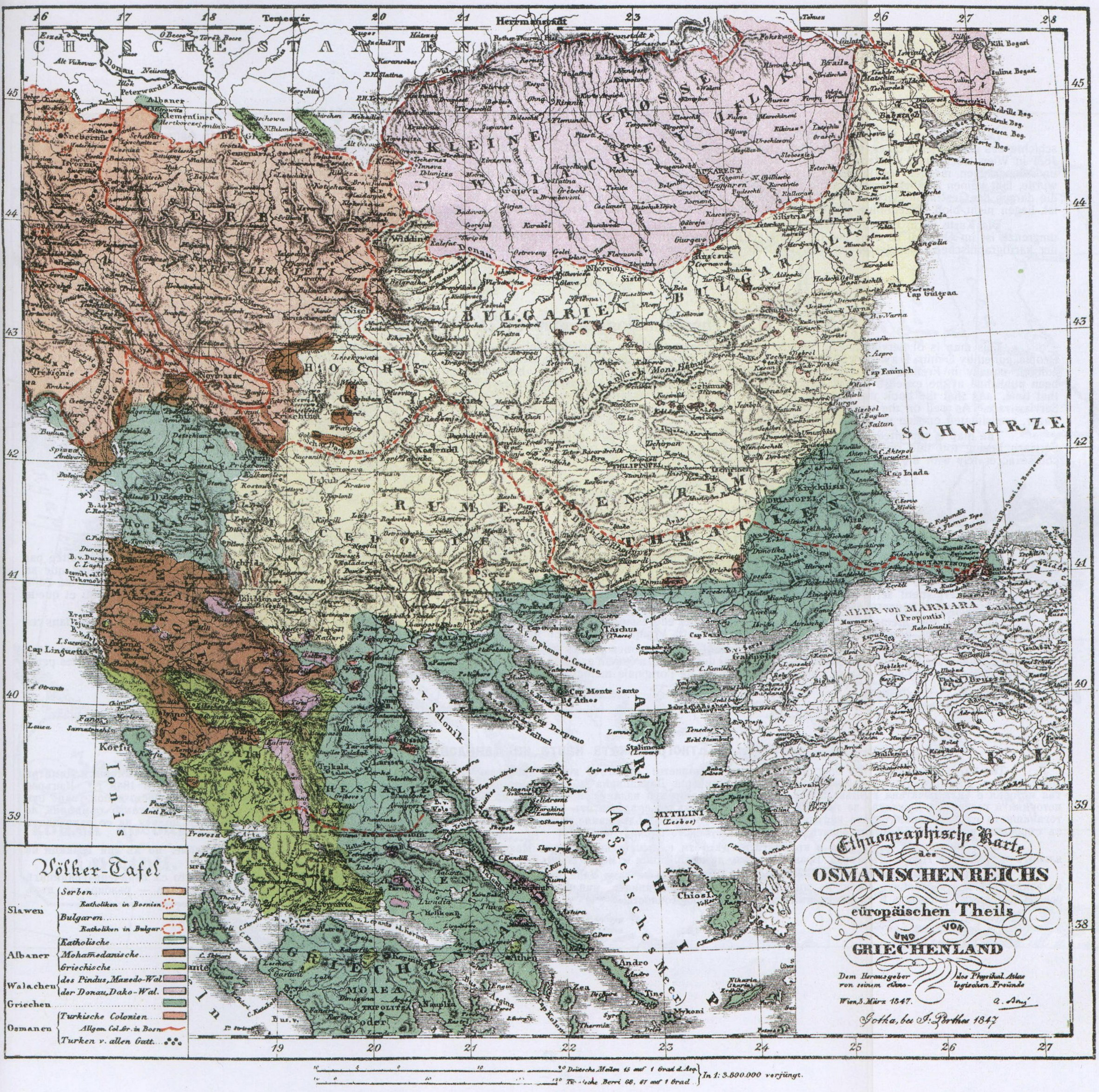
Ethnographic map of the Balkans in 1847 from Ami Boue.

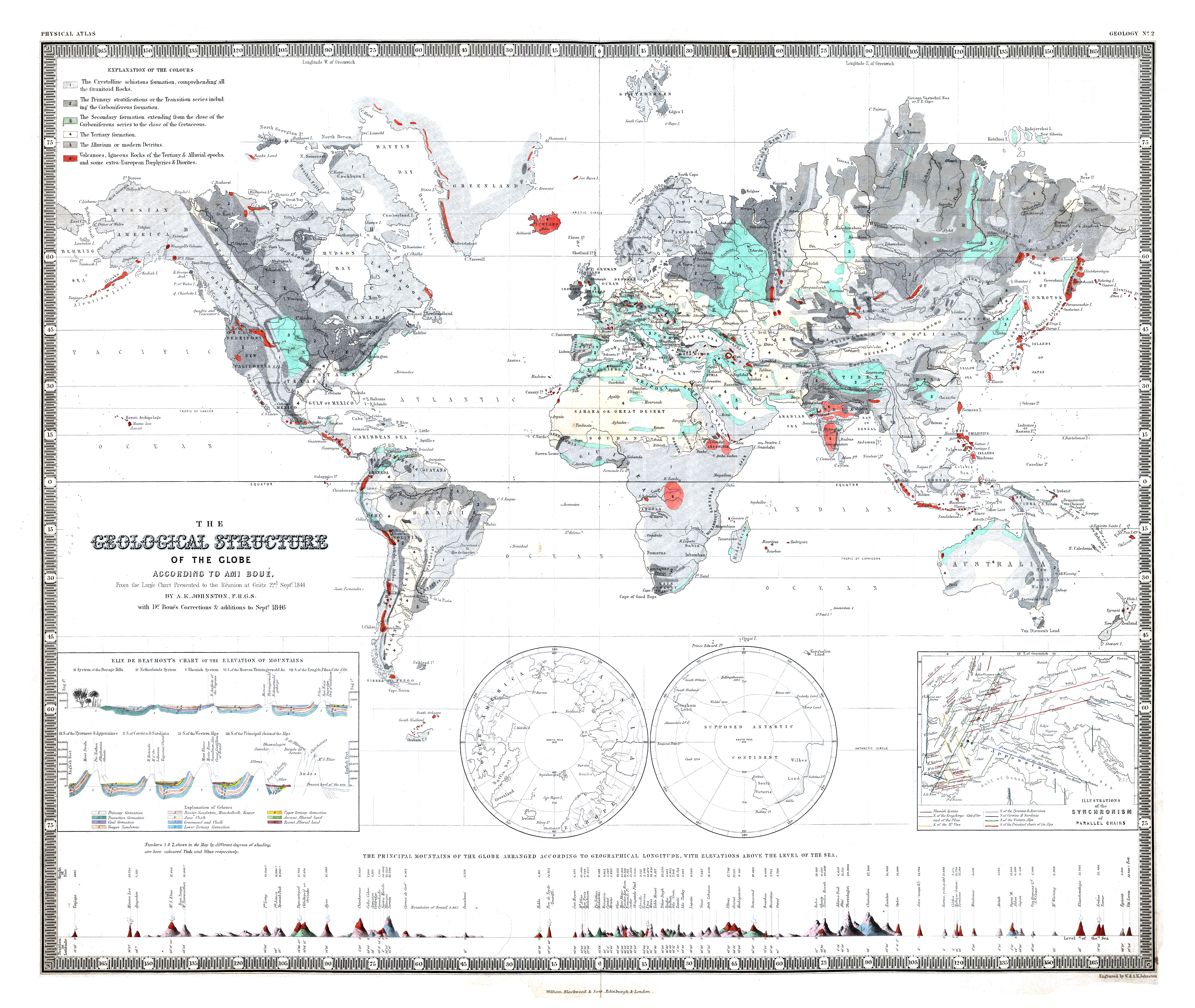
Geology of the world (1850)
