= Huon Bay (Antarctica) =

- Location within Antarctica
- Coordinates: 63°23′S 58°00′W
- Type: Bay

Huon Bay (63°23′S 58°00′W) is the bay about ´8 nautical miles (15 km; 9.2 mi) wide between Cape Ducorps and Cape Legoupil, along the north coast of Trinity Peninsula, Antarctica.

== Location ==
Trinity Peninsula, Antarctic Peninsula. Huon Bay towards northeast end

Huon Bay is in Graham Land on the north coast of the Trinity Peninsula, which forms the tip of the Antarctic Peninsula. It is southwest of the Schmidt Peninsula and northwest of the Laclavère Plateau. The Chilean Base General Bernardo O'Higgins Riquelme is to the east of the bay, as are the Duroch Islands and the Mott Snowfield. Cockerell Peninsula, Cape Ducorps and Lafond Bay are to the southwest.

== Exploration and name ==
A French expedition under Capt. Jules Dumont d'Urville, 1837–40, originally gave the name Huon to a cape in this area after Felix Huon de Kermadec, a member of the expedition. A survey by the Falkland Islands Dependencies Survey (FIDS) in 1946 did not identify the cape but applied the name to this bay which lies in the same area.

== Features ==
Features and nearby features include, from northeast to southwest,

=== Cape Legoupil ===
63°19′S 57°54′W. Cape at the northeast side of the entrance to Huon Bay, terminating in the Schmidt Peninsula. Discovered by a French expedition under Captain Jules Dumont d'Urville, 1837-40, and named for artist Ernest Goupil, who died on the expedition. The incorrect form Legoupil has been used so extensively that in this special case it is accepted.

=== Covadonga Harbor ===
63°19′S 57°55′W. A small extension of the northeast corner of Huon Bay immediately south of Cape Legoupil. Named by the Chilean Antarctic Expedition after their ship Covadonga, which first used this anchorage in 1947-48.

=== Demas Rocks ===
63°21′S 58°02′W. A group of rocks in the approach to Huon Bay, 3 nautical miles (5.6 km; 3.5 mi) northeast of Cape Ducorps. Discovered in March 1838 by Captain Jules Dumont d'Urville, who named the rocks for Lieutenant François Barlatier Demas of the expedition ship Astrolabe. The rocks were surveyed by FIDS in 1946.

=== Gervaize Rocks ===
63°21′S 58°06′W. A group of rocks about 3 nautical miles (5.6 km; 3.5 mi) north-northeast of Cape Ducorps. Mapped from surveys by FIDS (1960-61). Named by the UK Antarctic Place-Names Committee (UK-APC) for Charles Gervaize, French naval officer on the Astrolabe during her Antarctic voyage (1837-40).

=== Mount Jacquinot ===
63°22′S 57°53′W. A pyramidal peak, 475 metres (1,558 ft) high, with exposed rock on its north side, lying 3 nautical miles (5.6 km; 3.5 mi) south of Cape Legoupil and 1 nautical mile (1.9 km; 1.2 mi) east of Huon Bay. Discovered by a French expedition, 1837-40, under Captain Jules Dumont d'Urville, who named it for Lieutenant Charles Jacquinot, commander of the expedition ship Zelee.

=== Ogoya Glacier ===
63°27′S 58°01′W. A 8 kilometres (5.0 mi) long and 3 kilometres (1.9 mi) wide glacier situated northeast of Morro del Paso Peak, north of Misty Pass and northwest of Dabnik Peak. Draining northwards to enter Bransfield Strait east of Cockerell Peninsula. German-British mapping in 1996. Named after the settlement of Ogoya in Western Bulgaria.

== Sources ==
- Alberts, Fred G., ed. (1995), Geographic Names of the Antarctic (PDF) (2 ed.), United States Board on Geographic Names This article incorporates public domain material from websites or documents of the United States Board on Geographic Names.
- Graham Land and South Shetland Islands, BAS: British Antarctic Survey, 2005
- "Ogoya Glacier", Composite Gazetteer of Antarctica, Scientific Committee on Antarctic Research

This article incorporates public domain material from websites or documents of the United States Geological Survey.
