= Schmidt Peninsula (Antarctica) =

Small peninsula connected by a low isthmus to Cape Legoupil, Trinity Peninsula

- Location within Antarctica

Geography
- Location: Trinity Peninsula, Graham Land, Antarctica
- Coordinates: 63°19′S 57°54′W

Schmidt Peninsula (63°19′S 57°54′W) is a small peninsula connected by a low isthmus to Cape Legoupil on the Trinity Peninsula of Antarctica.

== Location ==
Trinity Peninsula, Antarctic Peninsula. Schmidt Peninsula towards northeast end

Schmidt Peninsula lies at the east end of Huon Bay on the north shore of Trinity Peninsula, which itself is the tip of the Antarctic Peninsula. It faces the Bransfield Strait. The Duroch Islands lie off the end of the peninsula. The Mott Snowfield is to the east and the Laclavere Plateau to the south. Cape Legoupil to the west terminates in Schmidt Peninsula.

== Name ==
The Schmidt Peninsula was named by the Chilean Antarctic Expedition of 1947-48 for Captain Hugo Schmidt Prado, Chilean Army, the first commander of Base General Bernardo O'Higgins Riquelme established in 1948 on this peninsula.

== Features ==
=== Unwin Cove ===
63°19′S 57°54′W. A cove immediately southeast of Toro Point. The cove was charted by the Chilean Antarctic Expedition, 1947-48, which named it for First Lieutenant Tomás Unwin Lambie, a naval officer of this expedition and the commander of the ship Lientur in these waters during the Chilean expeditions of 1949-50 and 1950-51.

=== Sotomayor Island ===
63°20′S 57°55′W. An island lying just south of the entrance to Unwin Cove. Named by the Chilean Antarctic Expedition of 1950-51 for Second Lieutenant Victor Sotomayor L., cargo officer of the ship Lientur during the expedition.

=== Toro Point ===
63°19′S 57°54′W. A point which forms the south extremity of Schmidt Peninsula and the north side of the entrance to Unwin Cove. Named by the fifth Chilean Antarctic Expedition (1950-51) after Carlos Toro Mazote G. who, as an aviation lieutenant in 1947, was one of the men chosen to occupy the General Bernardo O'Higgins station nearby. He was also a member of the fifth Chilean expedition aboard the ship Lientur.

=== Barrios Rocks ===
63°19′S 57°57′W. A small group of rocks lying 1 nautical mile (1.9 km; 1.2 mi) west of Toro Point. The name "Islote Barrios" was given by the Chilean Antarctic Expedition (1947-48) after Gen. Guillermo Barrios Tirado, minister of national defense who accompanied the Presidential Antarctic Expedition (1948) to this area in the Presidente Pinto. Air photographs of this feature appear to show three small rocks closely juxtaposed.

=== Estay Rock ===
63°19′S 57°59′W. A rock lying 1.8 nautical miles (3.3 km; 2.1 mi) west-southwest of Toro Point. The name appears on a Chilean government chart of 1948. Named for a minister of the Chilean government, Fidel Estay Cortéz.

=== Bahamonde Point ===
63°19′S 57°55′W. A point which marks the west extremity of Schmidt Peninsula. The point was charted by the Chilean Antarctic Expedition (1947-48) and named for First Lieutenant Arturo Bahamonde Calderón, engineer of the expedition.

== Sources ==
- Alberts, Fred G., ed. (1995), Geographic Names of the Antarctic (PDF) (2 ed.), United States Board on Geographic Names This article incorporates public domain material from websites or documents of the United States Board on Geographic Names.
- Graham Land and South Shetland Islands, BAS: British Antarctic Survey, 2005
- Trinity Peninsula (PDF) (Scale 1:250000 topographic map No. 5697), Institut für Angewandte Geodäsie and British Antarctic Survey, 1996, archived from the original (PDF) on 23 September 2015

This article incorporates public domain material from websites or documents of the United States Geological Survey.
