= Duroch Islands =

Islands of Antarctica

- Location within Antarctica

Geography
- Location: Antarctica
- Coordinates: 63°18′S 57°54′W

The Duroch Islands (63°18′S 57°54′W) are a group of islands and rocks which extend over an area of about 3 nautical miles (5.6 km; 3.5 mi), centred about 1 nautical mile (1.9 km; 1.2 mi) off Cape Legoupil on the north coast of Trinity Peninsula, Antarctica. The islands are close to Chile's Base General Bernardo O'Higgins Riquelme at Cape Legoupil.

== Location ==
Trinity Peninsula, Antarctic Peninsula. Duroch Islands towards northeast end

The Duroch Islands lie off the Schmidt Peninsula at the east end of Huon Bay on the north shore of Trinity Peninsula, which itself is the tip of the Antarctic Peninsula. They are in the Bransfield Strait. The Mott Snowfield is to the east and the Laclavère Plateau to the south. The main features are Kopaitic Island, Largo Island and the Wisconsin Islands. Nearby features include Bulnes Island and Link Island.

== Discovery and name ==
The Duroch Islands were discovered by a French expedition under Captain Jules Dumont d'Urville, 1837–40, who gave the name "Rocher Duroch" to one of the larger islands in the group. The Falkland Islands Dependencies Survey (FIDS), which charted the islands in 1946, recommended that the name Duroch be extended to include the entire group of islands. They are named for Ensign Joseph Duroch of d'Urville's expedition ship, the Astrolabe.

== Important Bird Area ==
The island group has been identified as an Important Bird Area (IBA) by BirdLife International because they support breeding colonies of several penguin species, including Adélies (800 pairs), chinstraps (9400 pairs) and gentoos (3500 pairs).

== Western features ==
Island, rocks and other features include, from southwest to northeast:

=== Romero Rock ===
63°19′S 57°57′W. A rock lying 0.1 nautical miles (0.19 km; 0.12 mi) west of Saavedra Rock. The Chilean Antarctic Expedition of 1947-48, under the command of Navy Captain Ernesto Gonzdlez Navarrete, made a survey of this area and gave the name "Islote Astrónomo Romero" after Astronomer of the Chilean Army Guillermo Romero González who was a member of the expedition and did astronomical work in the Antarctic. Around 1951 the name "Islote Romero" began to be used to avoid the compound name. The present name, Romero Rock, has been in use since 1962.

=== González Anchorage ===
63°19′S 57°56′W. An anchorage in the Duroch Islands on the west side of Kopaitic Island. The anchorage was charted by the Chilean Antarctic Expedition of 1948, which gave the name after Capital de Fragata Ernesto Gonzalez Navarrete, the commander of the expedition.

=== Saavedra Rock ===
63°19′S 57°56′W. The largest of several rocks at the southwest corner of Gonzalez Anchorage. Named by the fifth Chilean Antarctic Expedition, 1950-51, for Lieutenant Colonel Eduardo Saavedra R., chief army delegate aboard the ship Lautaro.

=== Gándara Island ===
63°19′S 57°56′W. An island immediately southwest of Kopaitic Island in the Duroch Islands. The name appears on a Chilean government chart of 1959. Presumably named for Comodoro Jorge Gándara, leader of the 1954-55 Chilean Antarctic expedition.

=== Kopaitic Island ===
63°19′S 57°55′W. An island lying 0.3 nautical miles (0.56 km; 0.35 mi) west of Cape Legoupil in the Duroch Islands. Named by the Chilean Antarctic Expedition of 1947 for Lieutenant Boris Kopaitic O'Neill, leader of the Chilean party at Greenwich Island in 1947.

=== Gutiérrez Reef ===
63°18′S 57°55′W. A reef with 2 fathoms (12 ft; 3.7 m) of water over it, located 0.2 nautical miles (0.37 km; 0.23 mi) north-northeast of the north end of Kopaitic Island in the Duroch Islands. Named by the second Chilean Antarctic Expedition (1948) after a boatswain by the name Gutierrez.

== Central features ==
=== Acuña Rocks ===
63°18′S 57°56′W. Two rocks lying 0.4 nautical miles (0.74 km; 0.46 mi) west of Largo Island. Named by the Chilean Antarctic Expedition, 1947-48, after Sub-Teniente Acuñna, a member of the expedition.

=== Vidaurre Rock ===
63°18′S 57°56′W. A rock which breaks the surface at low water lying 0.05 nautical miles (0.093 km; 0.058 mi) east of Acuna Rocks. Named by the fourth Chilean Antarctic Expedition, 1949-50.

=== Labbé Rock ===
63°17′S 57°56′W. A rock lying about 0.7 nautical miles (1.3 km; 0.81 mi) northwest of Largo Island. The name was conferred by the first Chilean Antarctic Expedition (1947) for First Lieutenant Custodio Labbé Lippi, navigation officer of the transport ship Angamos.

=== Rosa Rock ===
63°18′S 57°54′W. A small rock lying 0.1 nautical miles (0.19 km; 0.12 mi) west of Agurto Rock. Named by the second Chilean Antarctic Expedition, 1948, for Rosa González de Claro, daughter of the President of Chile, Gabriel González Videla.

=== Agurto Rock ===
63°18′S 57°54′W. A rock lying just northwest of Silvia Rock in the Duroch Islands. The name appears on a Chilean government chart of 1959.

=== Silvia Rock ===
63°18′S 57°54′W. A rock lying in the Duroch Islands just southeast of Agurto Rock and 0.3 nautical miles (0.56 km; 0.35 mi) north of Cape Legoupil. Named by the Chilean Antarctic Expedition, 1948, for a daughter of Gabriel González Videla, President of Chile.

=== Largo Island ===
63°18′S 57°53′W. An elongated island, 1 nautical mile (1.9 km; 1.2 mi) in extent, which is the largest of the Duroch Islands. It lies 1 nautical mile (1.9 km; 1.2 mi) west of Halpern Point. The Chilean Antarctic Expedition, 1947-48, charted the feature as three islands to which the personal names Rozas, Swett, and Horn were applied. Charted as one island by Martin Halpern, leader of the University of Wisconsin geological party in this area, 1961-62, who reported the name "Largo" (meaning long) to be the only one used by Chilean officials at the nearby General Bernardo O'Higgins Station.

== Eastern features ==
=== Ortiz Island ===
63°18′S 57°52′W. An island in the Duroch Islands. It lies 0.2 nautical miles (0.37 km; 0.23 mi) south of the eastern end of Largo Island and a like distance from the northern coast of Trinity Peninsula. The name was given by Martin Halpern, leader of the University of Wisconsin United States Antarctic Research Program (USARP) field party which geologically mapped the Duroch Islands, 1961-62. It honors Marcos Ortiz G., Captain of the Chilean ship Lientur which assisted in transporting the party during its study of this area.

=== Ponce Island ===
63°18′S 57°53′W. An island 0.1 nautical miles (0.19 km; 0.12 mi) east of Ortiz Island and 0.3 nautical miles (0.56 km; 0.35 mi) southeast of Largo Island. The island lies 1 nautical mile (1.9 km; 1.2 mi) northeast of the Chilean scientific station, General Bernardo O'Higgins. Named by Martin Halpern, leader of the University of Wisconsin field party during geological mapping of this area, 1961–62. Named for Lautaro Ponce, Chief of Antarctic Operations, University of Chile, in appreciation for Chilean logistical support provided to the Wisconsin field party.

=== Cohen Islands ===
63°18′S 57°52′W. A cluster of small islands between Ponce Island and Pebbly Mudstone Island in the southeast part of Duroch Islands. The group lies 0.5 nautical miles (0.93 km; 0.58 mi) west-southwest of Halpern Point. Named by United States Advisory Committee on Antarctic Names (US-ACAN) for Theodore J. Cohen, field assistant with the University of Wisconsin (USARP) party during geological mapping of this area, 1961-62.

=== Pebbly Mudstone Island ===
63°18′S 57°51′W. A small island in the southeast part of Duroch Islands. It lies 0.3 nautical miles (0.56 km; 0.35 mi) southwest of Halpern Point. Named by Martin Halpern, leader of the University of Wisconsin (USARP) party during geological mapping of this area, 1961-62. The principal outcrop of pebbly mudstone was found on this island and provides valuable data to the geologic history of the region.

=== Halpern Point ===
63°18′S 57°50′W. A point on the northern coast of Trinity Peninsula directly south of the eastern part of the Duroch Islands. Named by US-ACAN for Martin Halpern of the Geophysical and Polar Research Center, University of Wisconsin, Madison, leader of the field party which geologically mapped this area, 1961-62.

=== Wisconsin Islands ===
63°17′S 57°51′W. A group of a dozen or more small rocky islands which lie 1 nautical mile (1.9 km; 1.2 mi) northeast of Largo Island in the northeast part of the Duroch Islands. Named after the University of Wisconsin in Madison, Wisconsin. The name was applied by Martin Halpern, leader of the University of Wisconsin field party which geologically mapped these islands, 1961-62.

== Outlying islands ==
=== Bulnes Island ===
63°18′S 57°58′W. A small island lying 2 nautical miles (3.7 km; 2.3 mi) northwest of Cape Legoupil. Charted by the Chilean Antarctic Expedition of 1947-48 under Capital de Fragata Ernesto González Navarrete. Named by him for Manuel Bulnes Sanfuentes, Minister of National Defense during the preceding Chilean Antarctic Expedition of 1947.

=== Link Island ===
63°16′S 57°56′W. A small island at the outer (north) margin of the Duroch Islands, approximately 3 nautical miles (5.6 km; 3.5 mi) northwest of Halpern Point. The island was charted by the Chilean Antarctic Expedition, 1947-48, and called "Islote Sub-Teniente Ross" or "Islote Ross." Named by US-ACAN after David A. Link, field assistant with the University of Wisconsin (USARP) geological party during reconnaissance of this area, 1960-61. This name avoids possible confusion with James Ross Island.

=== Montravel Rock ===
63°09′S 58°02′W. A rock lying 11 nautical miles (20 km; 13 mi) northwest of Cape Legoupil off the northwest coast of the Trinity Peninsula. Discovered in February 1838 by Captain Jules Dumont d'Urville, who named it for Ensign Louis Tardy de Montravel of the expedition ship Zelée.

== Sources ==
- Alberts, Fred G., ed. (1995), Geographic Names of the Antarctic (PDF) (2 ed.), United States Board on Geographic Names This article incorporates public domain material from websites or documents of the United States Board on Geographic Names.
- "Duroch Islands", BirdLife Data zone: Important Bird Areas, BirdLife International, 2020
- Graham Land and South Shetland Islands, BAS: British Antarctic Survey, 2005
- Trinity Peninsula (PDF) (Scale 1:250000 topographic map No. 5697), Institut für Angewandte Geodäsie and British Antarctic Survey, 1996, archived from the original (PDF) on 23 September 2015

This article incorporates public domain material from websites or documents of the United States Geological Survey.
