= Duse Bay =

Bay in Antarctica

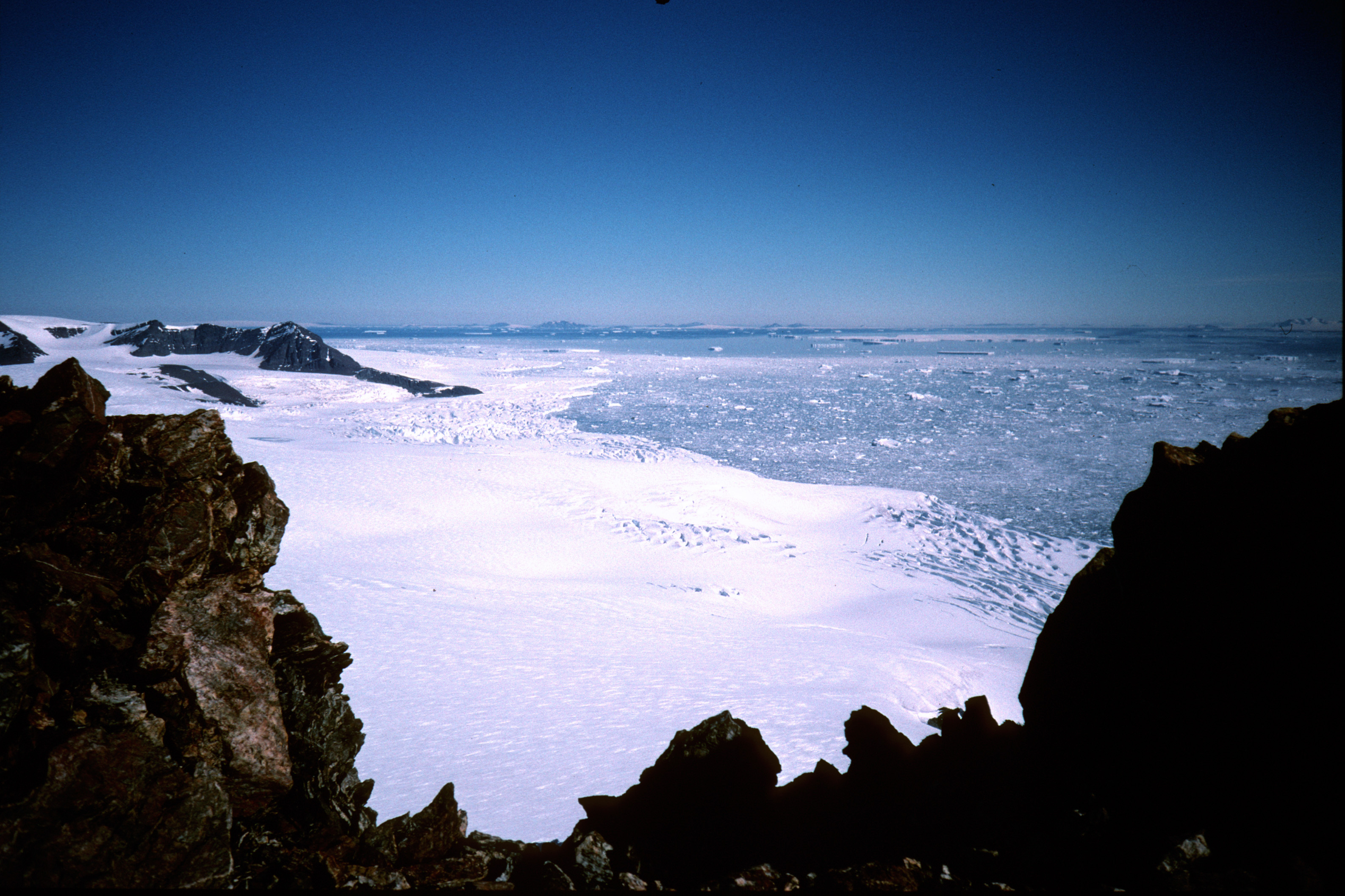
- From View Point looking east across Duse Bay

- Location within Antarctica
- Coordinates: 63°32′S 57°15′W

Duse Bay (63°32′S 57°15′W) is a bay indenting the south side of Trinity Peninsula between View Point and the western side of Tabarin Peninsula, Antarctica.

== Location ==
Trinity Peninsula, Antarctic Peninsula. Druse Bay towards southeast end

Duse Bay is in Graham Land in the Trinity Peninsula, which is the tip of the Antarctic Peninsula. It is south of the Mott Snowfield, east of View Point and west of the Tabarin Peninsula. It opens onto the Prince Gustav Channel. Mondor Glacier flows into the northeast corner of the bay. The Argentine Esperanza Base is on the east side of the bay. }

== Discovery and name ==
Duse Bay was discovered by a party under Johan Gunnar Andersson, of the Swedish Antarctic Expedition (SwedAE), 1901–04, and was named by Otto Nordenskiöld, the leader of that expedition, for Lieutenant S.A. Duse.

== Features ==
Features and nearby features include, clockwise from the southwest,

=== Skomlya Hill ===
63°32′45″S 57°30′15″W A rocky hill rising to 353 metres (1,158 ft) high at the base of a promontory projecting 5.5 kilometres (3.4 mi) eastwards and ending in View Point. Situated 8.95 kilometres (5.56 mi) southeast of Theodolite Hill and 6.79 kilometres (4.22 mi) west of View Point. Named after the settlement of Skomlya in Northwestern Bulgaria.

=== View Point ===
63°33′S 57°22′W. Eastern tip of a promontory, 150 metres (490 ft) high forming the west side of the entrance to Duse Bay on the south coast of Trinity Peninsula. Discovered by a party under J. Gunnar Andersson of the SwedAE, 1901-04. So named by the Falkland Islands Dependencies Survey (FIDS) following their survey of the area in 1945 because from this promontory, good panoramic photographs were obtained.

=== Boil Point ===
63°29′46″S 57°26′35″W. A point that forms the west side of the entrance to Retizhe Cove. Situated 6.45 kilometres (4.01 mi) northwest of View Point, 7.45 kilometres (4.63 mi) southeast of Theodolite Hill, 8.45 kilometres (5.25 mi) south of Camel Nunataks and 5.82 kilometres (3.62 mi) west-southwest of Garvan Point. Named after the settlement of Boil in Northeastern Bulgaria.

=== Retizhe Cove ===
63°28′10″S 57°25′30″W. A 5.8 kilometres (3.6 mi) wide cove indenting for 6.2 kilometres (3.9 mi) the south coast of Trinity Peninsular. Part of Duse Bay, entered between Boil Point to the west and Garvan Point to the east. Named after the Retizhe river in Pirin mountain, Southwestern Bulgaria.

=== Garvan Point ===
63°28′51″S 57°19′52″W. A rocky point forming the east side of the entrance to Retizhe Cove. Situated 7.18 kilometres (4.46 mi) north by east of View Point and 5.82 kilometres (3.62 mi) east-northeast of Boil Point. Named after the settlements of Garvan in Northern and Northeastern Bulgaria.

=== Mount Cardinall ===
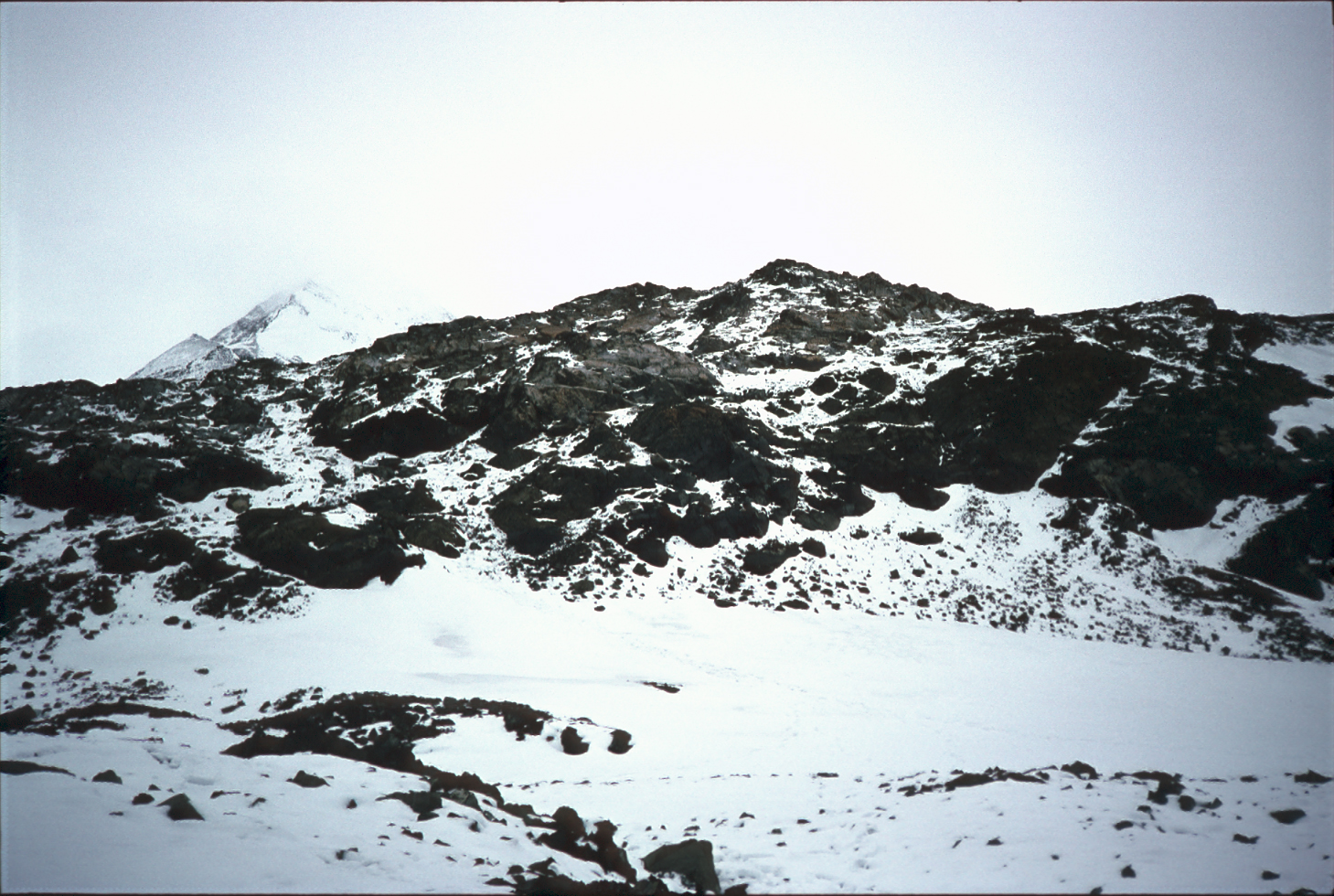
Mount Cardinall

63°27′S 57°10′W. A conical mountain, 675 metres (2,215 ft) high, lying close southwest of Mount Taylor and overlooking the northeast head of Duse Bay. Probably first seen by a party under J. Gunnar Andersson of the SwedAE, 1901-04. Charted in 1945 by the FIDS, who named it for Sir Allan Cardinall, then Governor of the Falkland Islands.

=== Mondor Glacier ===
63°28′S 57°08′W. A glacier 3.5 nautical miles (6.5 km; 4.0 mi) long flowing southwest from the head of Depot Glacier into Duse Bay. This glacier and Depot Glacier together fill the depression between Hope Bay and Duse Bay which marks the northern limit of the Tabarin Peninsula. Mapped in 1946 and 1956 by the FIDS, who named the feature in association with Tabarin Peninsula. "Operation Tabarin" (the forerunner of FIDS) was derived from the "Bal Tabarin" in Paris. In Recueil General des Oeuvres et Fantaisies de Tabarin, Tabarin was the buffoon who attracted the crowd to the booth where Mondor sold his quack medicines.

=== Thimble Peak ===
63°27′S 57°06′W. Truncated cone, 485 metres (1,591 ft) high, consisting of rock and ice, standing at the east side of Mondor Glacier and 2 nautical miles (3.7 km; 2.3 mi) northeast of Duse Bay at the northeast end of Antarctic Peninsula. First charted by the FIDS in 1946. The descriptive name was given by the UK Antarctic Place-Names Committee (UK-APC) in 1948.

== Sources ==
- Alberts, Fred G., ed. (1995), Geographic Names of the Antarctic (PDF) (2 ed.), United States Board on Geographic Names This article incorporates public domain material from websites or documents of the United States Board on Geographic Names.

REMA Explorer
The Reference Elevation Model of Antarctica (REMA) gives ice surface measurements of most of the continent. When a feature is ice-covered, the ice surface will differ from the underlying rock surface and will change over time. To see ice surface contours and elevation of a feature as of the last REMA update,
- Open the Antarctic REMA Explorer
- Enter the feature's coordinates in the box at the top left that says "Find address or place", then press enter
  The coordinates should be in DMS format, e.g. 65°05'03"S 64°01'02"W. If you only have degrees and minutes, you may not be able to locate the feature.
- Hover over the icons at the left of the screen
- Find "Hillshade" and click on that
  In the bottom right of the screen, set "Shading Factor" to 0 to get a clearer image
- Find "Contour" and click on that
  In the "Contour properties" box, select Contour Interval = 1m
  You can zoom in and out to see the ice surface contours of the feature and nearby features
- Find "Identify" and click on that
  Click the point where the contour lines seem to indicate the top of the feature
  The "Identify" box will appear to the top left. The Orthometric height is the elevation of the ice surface of the feature at this point.

- Antarctic REMA Explorer (Digital Elevation Models created by the Polar Geospatial Center from Maxar imagery), Polar Geospatial Center, University of Minnesota, 2019
- "Boil Point", Composite Gazetteer of Antarctica, Scientific Committee on Antarctic Research
- "Garvan Point", Composite Gazetteer of Antarctica, Scientific Committee on Antarctic Research
- Graham Land and South Shetland Islands, BAS: British Antarctic Survey, 2005
- "Retizhe Cove", Composite Gazetteer of Antarctica, Scientific Committee on Antarctic Research
- "Skomlya Hill", Composite Gazetteer of Antarctica, Scientific Committee on Antarctic Research
- Trinity Peninsula (PDF) (Scale 1:250000 topographic map No. 5697), Institut für Angewandte Geodäsie and British Antarctic Survey, 1996, archived from the original (PDF) on 23 September 2015
