= Laclavère Plateau =

Plateau in Antarctica

- Plateau
- Coordinates: 63°27′S 57°47′W
- Location: Trinity Peninsula, Graham Land

Laclavère Plateau (63°27′S 57°47′W) is a plateau, 10 nautical miles (19 km; 12 mi) long and from 1 to 3 nautical miles (1.9 to 5.6 km; 1.2 to 3.5 mi) wide, rising to 1,035 metres (3,396 ft) between Misty Pass and Theodolite Hill, Trinity Peninsula, Antarctica. The plateau rises south of Schmidt Peninsula and the Chilean scientific station, Base General Bernardo O'Higgins Riquelme.

== Location ==
Trinity Peninsula, Antarctic Peninsula. Laclavère Plateau towards northeast end

Laclavère Plateau is in Graham Land towards the north of the Trinity Peninsula, which forms the tip of the Antarctic Peninsula. It is southeast of the Huon Bay, south of the Duroch Islands and Schmidt Peninsula, west of the Mott Snowfield and Duse Bay and north of Broad Valley. Named features include Misty Pass in the west and Theodolite Hill in the east.

== Name ==
Laclavère Plateau was named by the UK Antarctic Place-Names Committee (UK-APC; 1963) after French cartographer Georges R. Laclavère, President of the Scientific Committee on Antarctic Research (SCAR), 1958–63.

== Features ==
Named features, from west to east, include:

=== Misty Pass ===
63°29′S 57°59′W. A pass, 700 metres (2,300 ft) high, between the head of Broad Valley and a valley descending north to Bransfield Strait, situated 8 nautical miles (15 km; 9.2 mi) southeast of Cape Ducorps. Mapped by the Falkland Islands Dependencies Survey (FIDS) in 1946, and so named because clouds pouring east through the pass had been noted by the survey party to herald bad weather.

=== Prilep Knoll ===
63°29′15″S 57°58′45″W An ice-covered hill rising to 713 metres (2,339 ft). Situated at the south entrance to Misty Pass west of Laclavère Plateau, 2.39 kilometres (1.49 mi) east of Morro del Paso Peak, 1.41 kilometres (0.88 mi) south by west of Dabnik Peak, 10.08 kilometres (6.26 mi) west of Kanitz Nunatak and 6.72 kilometres (4.18 mi) north of Yarlovo Nunatak. Surmounting Broad Valley to the southeast. German-British mapping in 1996. Named after the settlement of Prilep in Southeastern Bulgaria.

=== Dabnik Peak ===
63°28′31″S 57°58′17″W. A peak rising to 1,038 metres (3,406 ft) high off the west extremity of Laclavère Plateau on Trinity Peninsula, Antarctic Peninsula. Situated on the east side of Misty Pass, 14.2 kilometres (8.8 mi) southeast of Cape Ducorps, 11.14 kilometres (6.92 mi) southwest of Ami Boué Peak and 9.81 kilometres (6.10 mi) west-northwest of Kanitz Nunatak. Surmounting Broad Valley to the south and Ogoya Glacier to the NW. German-British mapping in 1996. Named after the town of Dolni Dabnik in Northern Bulgaria.

=== Ami Boué Peak ===
63°25′01″S 57°47′23″W. A peak rising to 808 metres (2,651 ft) high in the north extremity of Laclavère Plateau. Situated 8.79 kilometres (5.46 mi) south-southeast of Mount Jacquinot, 11.14 kilometres (6.92 mi) northeast of Dabnik Peak, 8.43 kilometres (5.24 mi) north of Kanitz Nunatak and 12.56 kilometres (7.80 mi) west-southwest of Fidase Peak. German-British mapping in 1996. Named after the French explorer of the Balkans Ami Boué (1794-1881).

=== Kanitz Nunatak ===
63°29′33″S 57°46′41″W. A rocky peak rising to 659 metres (2,162 ft) high in the southern foothills of Laclavère Plateau. Situated 8.43 kilometres (5.24 mi) south of Ami Boué Peak, 9.81 kilometres (6.10 mi) east-southeast of Dabnik Peak, 6.15 kilometres (3.82 mi) north of Cain Nunatak and 9.84 kilometres (6.11 mi) west by south of Theodolite Hill. Overlooking Broad Valley to the S. German-British mapping in 1996. Named after the settlement of Kanitz in Northwestern Bulgaria, in connection with the Austro-Hungarian geographer and ethnographer Felix Kanitz (1829-1904).

=== Theodolite Hill ===
63°29′S 57°35′W. A hill, 680 metres (2,230 ft) high, with a small rock outcrop at its summit, standing at the southeast corner of a plateau-type mountain 5 nautical miles (9.3 km; 5.8 mi) west of the northwest end of Duse Bay, in the northeast part of Trinity Peninsula. Discovered by the FIDS, 1946, and so named during their survey of the area because it served as an important theodolite station.

=== Urguri Nunatak ===
63°26′28″S 57°34′10″W. A rocky hill rising to 574 metres (1,883 ft). Situated in the east foothills of Laclavère Plateau, 2.49 kilometres (1.55 mi) west by north of Abrit Nunatak, 3.72 kilometres (2.31 mi) north of Theodolite Hill and 7.5 kilometres (4.7 mi) south of Fidase Peak. Overlooking Mott Snowfield to the north. German-British mapping in 1996. Named after the ancient and medieval fortress of Urguri in Southeastern Bulgaria.

=== Abrit Nunatak ===
63°26′46″S 57°31′10″W. A rocky hill rising to over 556 metres (1,824 ft). Situated east of Laclavère Plateau and south of Mott Snowfield, 4.47 kilometres (2.78 mi) northeast of Theodolite Hill, 2.49 kilometres (1.55 mi) east by south of Urguri Nunatak, 8.2 kilometres (5.1 mi) south by east of Fidase Peak and 4.83 kilometres (3.00 mi) southwest of Camel Nunataks. Overlooking Mott Snowfield to the north and Retizhe Cove to the SE. German-British mapping in 1996. Named after the settlement of Abrit in Northeastern Bulgaria.

== Sources ==
- "Abrit Nunatak", Composite Gazetteer of Antarctica, Scientific Committee on Antarctic Research
- Alberts, Fred G., ed. (1995), Geographic Names of the Antarctic (PDF) (2 ed.), United States Board on Geographic Names This article incorporates public domain material from websites or documents of the United States Board on Geographic Names.
- "Ami Boué Peak", Composite Gazetteer of Antarctica, Scientific Committee on Antarctic Research

REMA Explorer
The Reference Elevation Model of Antarctica (REMA) gives ice surface measurements of most of the continent. When a feature is ice-covered, the ice surface will differ from the underlying rock surface and will change over time. To see ice surface contours and elevation of a feature as of the last REMA update,
- Open the Antarctic REMA Explorer
- Enter the feature's coordinates in the box at the top left that says "Find address or place", then press enter
  The coordinates should be in DMS format, e.g. 65°05'03"S 64°01'02"W. If you only have degrees and minutes, you may not be able to locate the feature.
- Hover over the icons at the left of the screen
- Find "Hillshade" and click on that
  In the bottom right of the screen, set "Shading Factor" to 0 to get a clearer image
- Find "Contour" and click on that
  In the "Contour properties" box, select Contour Interval = 1m
  You can zoom in and out to see the ice surface contours of the feature and nearby features
- Find "Identify" and click on that
  Click the point where the contour lines seem to indicate the top of the feature
  The "Identify" box will appear to the top left. The Orthometric height is the elevation of the ice surface of the feature at this point.

- Antarctic REMA Explorer (Digital Elevation Models created by the Polar Geospatial Center from Maxar imagery), Polar Geospatial Center, University of Minnesota, 2019
- "Dabnik Peak", Composite Gazetteer of Antarctica, Scientific Committee on Antarctic Research
- Graham Land and South Shetland Islands, BAS: British Antarctic Survey, 2005
- "Kanitz Nunatak", Composite Gazetteer of Antarctica, Scientific Committee on Antarctic Research
- "Prilep Knoll", Composite Gazetteer of Antarctica, Scientific Committee on Antarctic Research
- Trinity Peninsula (PDF) (Scale 1:250000 topographic map No. 5697), Institut für Angewandte Geodäsie and British Antarctic Survey, 1996, archived from the original (PDF) on 23 September 2015
- "Urguri Nunatak", Composite Gazetteer of Antarctica, Scientific Committee on Antarctic Research

This article incorporates public domain material from websites or documents of the United States Geological Survey.
