= View Point =

Headland in Antarctica

Coordinates: 63°33′S 57°22′W

Location of View Point
Antarctica

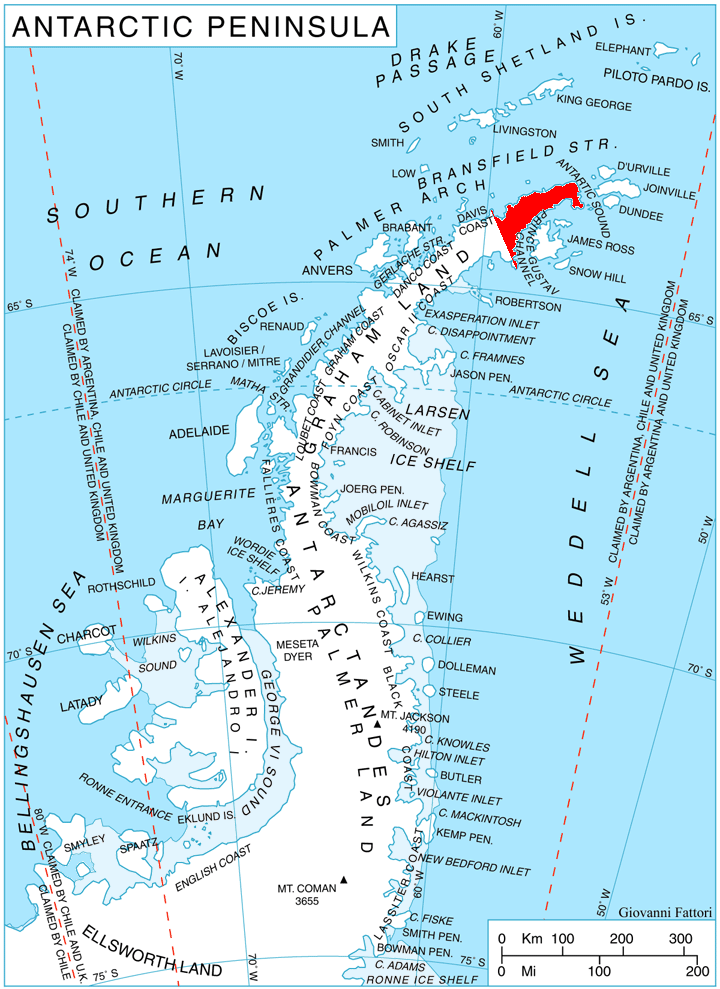
Location of Trinity Peninsula.

View Point () is 150m long eastern tip of a promontory, on Antarctica, forming the west side of the entrance to Duse Bay on the south coast of Trinity Peninsula, on the northern portion of the Antarctic Peninsula. Situated 6.79 km east of Skomlya Hill and 6.45 km southeast of Boil Point. Discovered by a party under J. Gunnar Andersson of the Swedish Antarctic Expedition, 1901–04. So named by the Falkland Islands Dependencies Survey (FIDS) following their survey of the area in 1945 because from this promontory, good panoramic photographs were obtained.

== Research Stations ==
=== Station V ===
View Point was the location of the British research Station V. It was active intermittently from June 3, 1953, to November 25, 1963, with the intention of searching in the survey, meteorology and geology. The construction of the first hut started on June 3, 1953, the second was established on March 20, 1956. On July 29, 1996, the Station V was transferred to Chile who renamed it General Ramon Cans Montalva, later renamed General Jorge Boonen Rivera Base.

=== Jorge Boonen Rivera Base ===
General Jorge Boonen Rivera Base is a small Chilean Antarctic refuge administered by the Chilean Army, located in Duse Bay, Trinity Peninsula, Antarctic Peninsula. Initially it was the British "Station V", erected as a satellite base of the Station D located in Hope Bay; Station D was then assigned to Uruguay in 1997 and renamed Ruperto Elichiribehety. As part of a plan to remove or transfer abandoned facilities, in cooperation with the Antarctic Treaty System, on July 29, 1996, Station V was transferred to Chile, which renamed it General Ramón Cañas Montalva who later became Jorge Boonen Rivera.

The refuge consists of a hut enabled as a room and a second machine house, bathroom and storage. It is located about 36 kilometres (22 mi) away from the Chilean O'Higgins Base, on which it depends. Currently the installation is regularly maintained by Chile, for use as an emergency shelter, allowing 8 people to survive in it for 20 days in the event of an accident. For this purpose, the station has an electric generator, as well as fuel, food, water and gas. In September 2005 three soldiers of the Chilean Army died in the vicinity of the Refuge, when their snowmobile fell into a crevasse.

=== Cristo Redentor Refuge ===
Refuge Cristo Redentor is an Antarctic refuge located at the western access to Duse Bay in the Trinity Peninsula, 25 kilometres (16 mi) from Esperanza Base. It is administered by the Argentine Army and was inaugurated on May 25, 1955. The Refuge, is one of the 18 shelters that are under the responsibility of Esperanza, which is responsible for the maintenance and the care. It has capacity for 12 people, food for two months, fuel, gas and first aid kit. It has been used in some Argentine scientific campaigns and ordinary patrolling. The main scientific observations are the geology and topography of the area, the sea ice and survey on the Crabeater seal and the Weddell seal.

Between September 1956 and January 1957, the assistant Sergeant Domingo Avila and Sergeant Telmo Buonomo, officiating as commissioners in the refuge area, were isolated by an early melting of the sea in the Duse Bay. They survived four months until were rescued by an ARA General San Martìn icebreaker helicopter.

== Map ==
- Trinity Peninsula. Scale 1:250000 topographic map No. 5697. Institut für Angewandte Geodäsie and British Antarctic Survey, 1996.

== See also ==
- List of Antarctic research stations
- List of Antarctic field camps
