= Mount Bransfield =

Mountain in Graham Land, Antarctica

- Location within Antarctica

Highest point
- Coordinates: 63°17′S 57°5′W

Geography
- Location: Trinity Peninsula, Graham Land
- Continent: Antarctica

Mount Bransfield (63°17′S 57°5′W) is a prominent conical-topped, ice-covered mountain, 760 metres (2,490 ft) high, rising 2 nautical miles (3.7 km; 2.3 mi) southwest of Cape Dubouzet at the northeast tip of the Antarctic Peninsula.

== Location ==
Trinity Peninsula, Antarctic Peninsula. Mount Bransfield near northeast tip

Mount Bransfield is southeast of Prime Head, the northern tip of Trinity Peninsula, which itself is the tip of the Antarctic Peninsula. It is east of the Mott Snowfield, west of the Antarctic Sound and north of Hope Bay. It faces Bransfield Island to the east. Nearby features include Cape Dubouzet to the north, Koerner Rock and Bahía Chica to the south.

== Discovery and name ==
Mount Bransfield was discovered by a French expedition, 1837–40, under Captain Jules Dumont d'Urville, who named it for Edward Bransfield, Master, Royal Navy, who circumnavigated and charted the South Shetland Islands in 1820.

== Nearby features ==
Nearby features, from north to south, include:

=== Cape Dubouzet ===
63°16′S 57°03′W. A cape which marks the northeast extremity of Antarctic Peninsula. Charted in 1838 by a French expedition under Captain Jules Dumont d'Urville, who named it for Lieutenant Joseph Dubouzet of the expedition ship Zélée.

=== Obzor Hill ===
63°16′00″S 57°05′43″W. A hill that rises to 479 metres (1,572 ft) high at the northeast tip of Trinity Peninsula. It is situated 2.46 kilometres (1.53 mi) west-southwest of Cape Dubouzet, 1.18 kilometres (0.73 mi) north of Mount Bransfield and 1.87 kilometres (1.16 mi) northwest of Vishegrad Knoll. German-British mapping in 1996. Named after the settlement of Obzor in Eastern Bulgaria.

=== Vishegrad Knoll ===
63°16′33″S 57°03′51″W. A hill that rises to 532 metres (1,745 ft) high at the northeast tip of Trinity Peninsula. Situated 2.21 kilometres (1.37 mi) south-southwest of Cape Dubouzet, 1.87 kilometres (1.16 mi) southeast of Obzor Hill and 1.83 kilometres (1.14 mi) east of Mount Bransfield. German-British mapping in 1996. Named after the settlement of Vishegrad in Southern Bulgaria.

=== Koerner Rock ===
63°19′S 57°05′W. A small but conspicuous rock outcrop 4 nautical miles (7.4 km; 4.6 mi) southwest of Cape Dubouzet. Named by the UK Antarctic Place-Names Committee (UK-APC) for Roy M. Koerner, Falkland Islands Dependencies Survey (FIDS) assistant meteorologist and glaciologist at Hope Bay, 1957-60.

=== Bahía Chica ===
63°21′S 57°03′W. Bahía Chica (Small Bay) is a bay on the coast of the Antarctic Peninsula. The name originates from Argentina.

== Sources ==
- Alberts, Fred G., ed. (1995), Geographic Names of the Antarctic (PDF) (2 ed.), United States Board on Geographic Names This article incorporates public domain material from websites or documents of the United States Board on Geographic Names.

REMA Explorer
The Reference Elevation Model of Antarctica (REMA) gives ice surface measurements of most of the continent. When a feature is ice-covered, the ice surface will differ from the underlying rock surface and will change over time. To see ice surface contours and elevation of a feature as of the last REMA update,
- Open the Antarctic REMA Explorer
- Enter the feature's coordinates in the box at the top left that says "Find address or place", then press enter
  The coordinates should be in DMS format, e.g. 65°05'03"S 64°01'02"W. If you only have degrees and minutes, you may not be able to locate the feature.
- Hover over the icons at the left of the screen
- Find "Hillshade" and click on that
  In the bottom right of the screen, set "Shading Factor" to 0 to get a clearer image
- Find "Contour" and click on that
  In the "Contour properties" box, select Contour Interval = 1m
  You can zoom in and out to see the ice surface contours of the feature and nearby features
- Find "Identify" and click on that
  Click the point where the contour lines seem to indicate the top of the feature
  The "Identify" box will appear to the top left. The Orthometric height is the elevation of the ice surface of the feature at this point.

- Antarctic REMA Explorer (Digital Elevation Models created by the Polar Geospatial Center from Maxar imagery), Polar Geospatial Center. University of Minnesota, 2019
- "Bahía Chica", Composite Gazetteer of Antarctica, Scientific Committee on Antarctic Research
- Graham Land and South Shetland Islands, BAS: British Antarctic Survey, 2005
- "Obzor Hill", Composite Gazetteer of Antarctica, Scientific Committee on Antarctic Research
- Trinity Peninsula (PDF) (Scale 1:250000 topographic map No. 5697), Institut für Angewandte Geodäsie and British Antarctic Survey, 1996, archived from the original (PDF) on 23 September 2015
- "Vishegrad Knoll", Composite Gazetteer of Antarctica, Scientific Committee on Antarctic Research

This article incorporates public domain material from websites or documents of the United States Geological Survey.
