= SMILE (spacecraft) =

Chinese–European satellite

Solar wind Magnetosphere Ionosphere Link Explorer
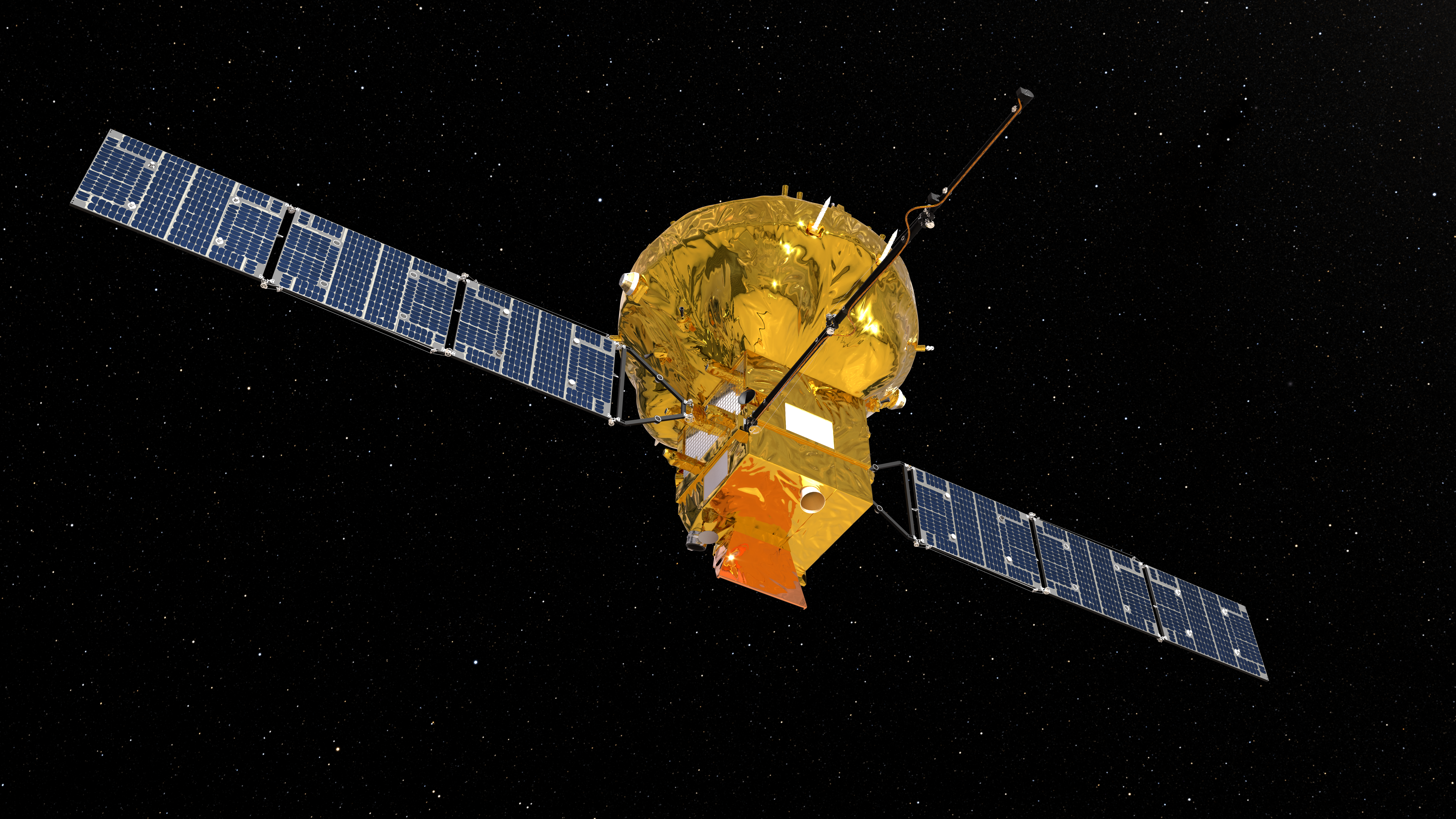
- Artist's impression of the SMILE spacecraft
- Mission type: Magnetospheric mission
- Operator: European Space Agency and Chinese Academy of Sciences
- COSPAR ID: 2026-109A
- SATCAT no.: 69123
- Website: cosmos.esa.int/web/smile/
- Mission duration: 3 years (planned); 4 months and 20 days (in progress)

Spacecraft properties
- Manufacturer: Airbus (payload module)
- Launch mass: 2,250 kg (4,960 lb)
- Dry mass: 708 kg (1,561 lb)
- Power: 850 W

Start of mission
- Launch date: 19 May 2026, 03:52:10 UTC
- Rocket: Vega C (VV29)
- Launch site: Guiana, ELV
- Contractor: Avio

Orbital parameters
- Reference system: Geocentric orbit
- Regime: Highly elliptical orbit
- Perigee altitude: 5,000 km (3,100 mi)
- Apogee altitude: 121,182 km (75,299 mi)
- Inclination: 73°
- ESA insignia Cosmic Vision (ESA Science Programme)

Solar wind Magnetosphere Ionosphere Link Explorer (SMILE) is a spacecraft mission of the European Space Agency and the Chinese Academy of Sciences launched on 19 May 2026 from the Guiana Space Centre in French Guiana. SMILE will image for the first time the magnetosphere of the Earth in soft X-rays and UV during up to 40 hours per orbit, improving the understanding of the dynamic interaction between the solar wind and Earth's magnetosphere. The mission is estimated to last for three years. The prime science questions of the SMILE mission involve the fundamental modes of dayside solar wind-magnetosphere interaction, the processes defining the substorm cycle, and how coronal mass ejection-driven storms develop and relate to substorms.

== Objectives ==
The mission will observe the solar wind interaction with the magnetosphere with its X-ray and ultraviolet cameras (SXI and UVI), gathering simultaneous images and videos of the dayside magnetopause (where Earth's magnetosphere meets the solar wind), the polar cusps (a region in each hemisphere where particles from the solar wind have direct access to Earth's ionosphere), and the auroral oval (the region around each geomagnetic pole where auroras most often occur). SMILE will also gather simultaneously in situ measurements with its two other instruments making up its payload – an ion analyser called LIA and a fluxgate magnetometer named MAG. These instruments will monitor the ions in the solar wind, magnetosheath and magnetosphere while detecting changes in the local DC magnetic field.

== Orbit ==
SMILE had to reach a high enough altitude to view the outside edge of Earth's magnetopause and at the same time obtain good spatial resolution of the auroral oval. The chosen orbit is therefore highly elliptical and highly inclined (73 degrees), and takes SMILE a third of the way to the Moon at apogee (an altitude of 19 Earth radii).

This type of orbit enables SMILE to spend much of its time (about 80%, equivalent to nine months of the year) at high altitude, allowing the spacecraft to collect continuous observations for the first time during more than 40 hours. This orbit also limits the time spent in the high-radiation Van Allen belts.

SMILE was launched into low Earth orbit in May 2026 by a Vega-C launch vehicle from Kourou, French Guiana. Over the course of a month, its propulsion module brought the spacecraft to its nominal orbit, a polar orbit with apogee and perigee altitudes of 120,920 km above the North Pole and 5,027 km above the South Pole, respectively. When passing over Antarctica, the satellite transmits data to the German Antarctic Receiving Station, operated by DLR.

Animations of SMILE's orbit

Around the Earth - Front

Around the Earth - Side

SMILE · Earth

== Spacecraft ==
Descriptive artist impression of SMILE

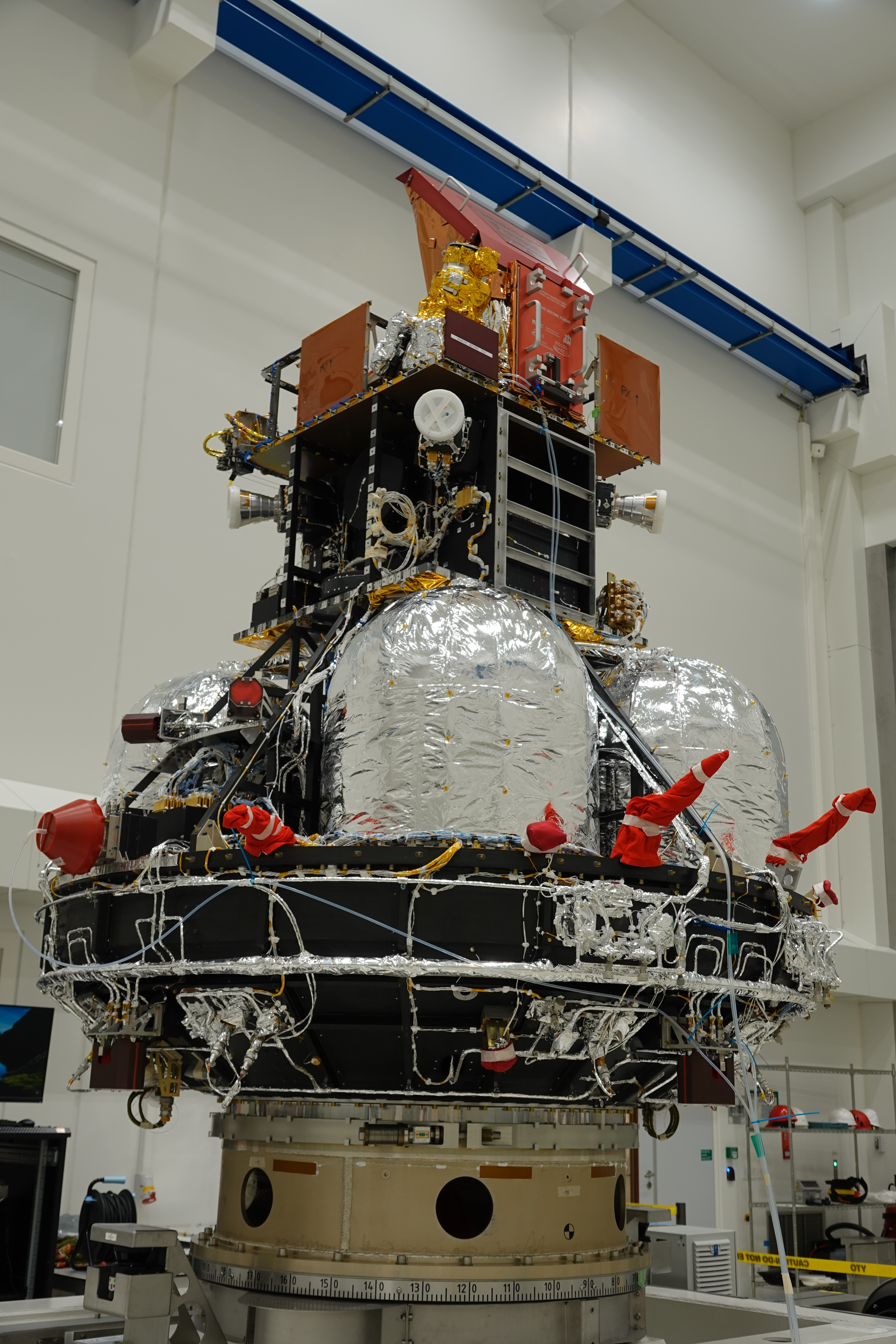
On 21 January 2025, engineers at ESA connected the two main parts of the Smile spacecraft, putting it into its final flight configuration.

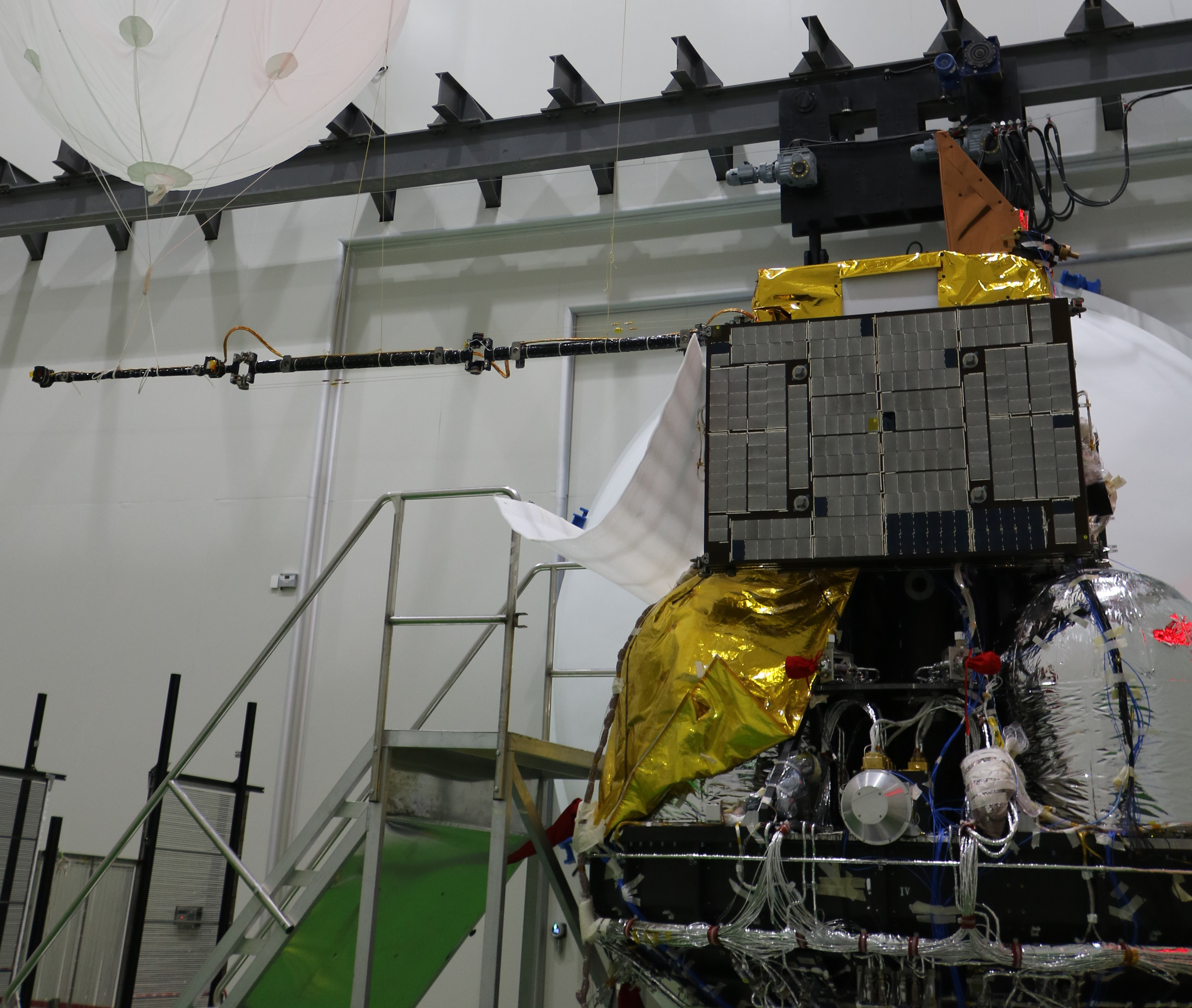
Smile spacecraft during a test of the magnetometer boom deployment

The SMILE spacecraft consists of a platform provided by CAS attached below a payload module provided by ESA. The CAS platform is composed of a propulsion and a service module, together with the two detectors of the LIA instrument. The payload module, built by Airbus, hosts 3 of the 4 scientific instruments and an X-band communications system.

== Ground segment ==
The SMILE ground segment comprises the Chinese Academy of Sciences (CAS) ground segment and the European Space Agency (ESA) ground segment, which collaborate closely on this mission. The Ground Support System (GSS) and the Science and Application System (SAS) are two important components of the CAS ground segment. The SAS is tasked with fostering collaboration between CAS and ESA, designing effective frameworks to coordinate scientists in planning SMILE science operations.

== Instruments ==
The spacecraft is equipped with four scientific instruments:

- Soft X-ray Imager (SXI) – wide-field lobster-eye telescope using micropore optics to spectrally map the location, shape, and motion of Earth's magnetospheric boundaries, including the bow shock, magnetopause, and cusps, by observing emission from the [Solar Wind Charge eXchange (SWCX) process. The SXI is equipped with two large X-ray-sensitive Charge-coupled device (CCD) detectors covering the 0.2 keV to 2.5 keV energy band, and has an optic field of view spanning 15.5° × 26.5°. This telescope was developed, built, and calibrated at the University of Leicester, UK, and other institutions throughout Europe. CCDs have been procured from Teledyne e2v, UK, by ESA and calibrated by The Open University, UK.
- UV Imager (UVI) – an ultraviolet camera to image Earth's northern auroral regions. It will study the connection between the processes taking place at the magnetospheric boundaries – as seen by the SXI – and those acting on the charged particles precipitating into our ionosphere. UVI is a four mirror telescope imaging ultraviolet emissions with wavelengths from 160 to180 nm using a CCD detector. It is broken into three logical partitions: UVI-Camera (UVI-C) and UVI-Electronics (UVI-E) connected via a harness (UVI-H). The UVI optical design philosophy is based on an on-axis, 4-mirror system, optimized for the SMILE orbit and the required cadence and spatial resolution. UV filter technology coupled with the 4-mirror design provides orders of magnitude greater visible light suppression than previous auroral missions and is an enabling factor for the UVI science objectives. The detector module comprises a micro-channel plate (MCP) based image intensifier optically coupled to a CCD detector. The UVI has a 10° × 10° field of view and will have a spatial image resolution at apogee of 150 km, using four thin film-coated mirrors to guide light into its detector. Temporal resolution will be up to 60s. UVI is built by NSSC with collaboration from Belgium Liège Space Center (CSL), ESA, Calgary University and the Polar Research Institute of China.
- Light Ion Analyser (LIA) – will determine the properties and behaviour of the solar wind and magnetosheath ions under various conditions by measuring the three-dimensional velocity distribution of protons and alpha particles. It is made of two top-hat-type electrostatic analysers, each mounted on opposite side of the platform. It is capable of sampling the full 4 π three-dimensional distribution of the solar wind, and can measure ions in the energy range 0.05 to 20 keV at up 0.5 second time resolution. It is a joint venture between the Chinese National Space Science Centre, CAS, and University College London's Mullard Space Science Laboratory (UCL-MSSL), UK and LPP/CNRS/Ecole Polytechnique, France.
- Magnetometer (MAG) – will be used to determine the orientation and magnitude of the magnetic field in the solar wind and magnetosheath, and to detect any solar wind shocks or discontinuities passing over the spacecraft. Two tri-axial sensors will be mounted away from the spacecraft on a 3-m-long boom some 80 cm apart, with a corresponding electronics unit mounted on SMILE's main body. This configuration will let the MAG act as a gradiometer, and allow SMILE's background magnetic field to be accurately determined and subtracted from any measurements. MAG will measure the three components of the magnetic field in the range +/- 12800 nT. It is joint venture between the Chinese National Space Science Centre, CAS, and the Space Research Institute, Austrian Academy of Sciences.

== History ==
Following the success of the Double Star mission, the ESA and CAS decided to jointly select, design, implement, launch and exploit the results of a space mission together for the first time. After initial workshops, a call for proposals was announced in January 2015. After a joint peer review of mission proposals, SMILE was selected as the top candidate out of 13 proposed. The SMILE mission proposal was jointly led by the University College London and the Chinese National Space Science Center.

=== Development ===
From June to November 2015, the mission entered initial studies for concept readiness, and final approval was given for the mission by the ESA Science Programme Committee in November 2015. The Mission System Requirements Review was completed in October 2018, and ESA Mission Adoption by the Science Programme Committee was granted in March 2019. The Preliminary Design Review (PDR) was held in January 2020 and verified that the spacecraft design was fulfilling the science objectives.

=== Construction ===
SMILE successfully completed the Spacecraft and Mission Critical Design Review (CDR) in June 2023 in Shanghai. SMILE's payload module, built by Airbus in Spain, arrived at ESTEC in September 2024 followed by the Chinese-built platform which arrived at ESTEC on a dedicated flight from Shanghai on 9 December 2024. The two parts were connected on 21 January 2025. In April 2025, the spacecraft was moved into the Maxwell Test Chamber at ESTEC for space environment testing and later it underwent measurements of mass properties and vibration testing. The spacecraft has passed its qualification and flight acceptance review in October 2025.

=== Launch campaign ===
On 11 February 2026, the spacecraft left ESTEC, was loaded onto the Colibri cargo ship of Maritime Nantaise at the Port of Amsterdam, and departed on a two week journey to French Guiana. Two days later, the ship picked up the upper stage of SMILE's Vega-C rocket in Saint Nazaire. On 26 February 2026, the vessel docked in Kourou, French Guiana. On 20 March 2026, the spacecraft's four tanks were filled with 1,520 litres of hydrazine and ESA revealed the planned launch date of 9 April 2026. On 26 March 2026, the spacecraft was encapsulated in Vega-C's payload fairing.

On 5 April 2026, Avio postponed the launch after an issue was identified on the Vega-C rocket. On 23 April, ESA announced a new launch date for SMILE: 19 May 2026. On 8 May 2026, the spacecraft, inside its payload fairing, was transported to the launch pad and placed atop Vega-C, completing the rocket for launch. The spacecraft lifted off on 19 May 2026 at 3:52 UTC, its first signal was received by New Norcia station at 4:48 UTC, and its solar panels deployed at 4:49 UTC. This was the first Vega launch managed directly by Avio instead of Arianespace.

=== In orbit ===
After launch, the spacecraft performed 11 apogee-raising maneuvers and one perigee-raising maneuver and reached its designated science orbit on 20 June 2026. On 23 September 2026, SMILE concluded its commissioning period and started science observations. On 30 September 2026, ESA published a video taken by UVI on 24 July 2026 – the first ultraviolet footage of the full ring of northern lights since 2008.

SMILE's first ultraviolet footage shows auroral substorm (video)

SMILE's ultraviolet image shows auroral substorm

SMILE's X-ray image shows supernova remnant in Large Magellanic Cloud

SMILE's X-ray image shows Cassiopeia A

SMILE's light ion analyser working in space

SMILE's magnetometer working in space

== See also ==
- List of European Space Agency programmes and missions
- List of heliophysics missions
