= Tupinier Islands =

Islands of Antarctica

Coordinates: 63°21′56″S 58°16′15″W

Location in Antarctica

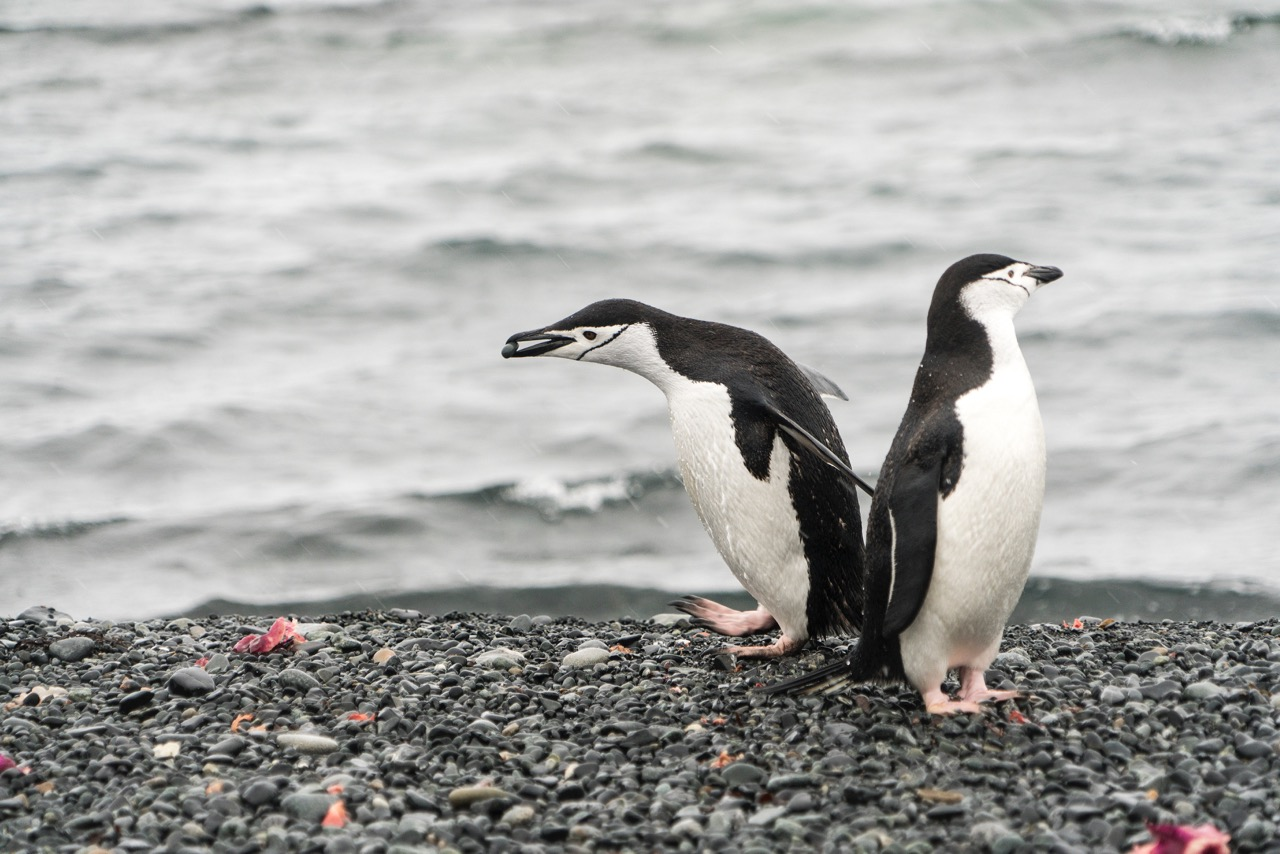
Chinstrap penguins breed in the IBA

The Tupinier Islands are a group of pyramid-shaped islands lying off the north coast of Trinity Peninsula, about 6 km (3.7 mi) west of Cape Ducorps. They were discovered by the French expedition under Captain Jules Dumont d'Urville, 1837–40, and named after Baron Tupinier (1779–1850), an official of the French Naval Ministry who was instrumental in obtaining government support for the expedition. The islands were recharted by the Falkland Islands Dependencies Survey (FIDS) in 1946.

== Important Bird Area ==
The island group has been designated an Important Bird Area (IBA) by BirdLife International because it supports a large breeding colony of about 14,000 pairs of chinstrap penguins. Imperial shags also nest at the site.

== See also ==
- List of Antarctic and Subantarctic islands
- Molina Rocks, 4 nautical miles (7 km) west of the Tupinier Islands
