= Prime Head =

Headland in Antarctica

- Location within Antarctica

Geography
- Coordinates: 63°12′48.37″S 57°18′5.28″W

Prime Head (63°12′48.37″S 57°18′5.28″W) is a prominent snow-covered headland which forms the north extremity of the Antarctic Peninsula.

== Location ==
Trinity Peninsula, Antarctic Peninsula. Prime Head at northeast tip

Prime Head is the northern tip of Trinity Peninsula, which itself is the tip of the Antarctic Peninsula. It faces the Bransfield Strait, which the Antarctic Sound enters to its east. Casy Island and Coupvent Point are to the west, Mott Snowfield is to the south and Cape Siffrey and Mount Bransfield are to the east. The Gourdin Island and Column Rock are just north of Prime Head.

== Name ==
The name Siffrey was given to a cape in this vicinity by the French Antarctic Expedition under Captain Jules Dumont d'Urville, 1837–40, and was previously approved for the feature here described. D'Urville's "Cap Siffrey" has since been identified by the UK Antarctic Place-Names Committee (UK-APC) as a point two miles to the east-southeast, now called Siffrey Point. The name Prime Head, given by the UK-APC in 1963, alludes to the position of the headland as the first or northernmost feature of Antarctic Peninsula.

== Nearby features ==
=== Siffrey Point ===
63°13′S 57°13′W. A low rocky point projecting from the north coast of Trinity Peninsula, 6 nautical miles (11 km; 6.9 mi) west-northwest of Cape Dubouzet. The feature is a reidentification of "Cap Siffrey," named by Captain Jules Dumont d'Urville in 1838.

=== Gourdin Island ===
63°12′S 57°18′W. Largest island in a group of islands and rocks 1 nautical mile (1.9 km; 1.2 mi) north of Prime Head. Discovered by a French expedition, 1837-40, under Captain Jules Dumont d'Urville, and named by him for Ensign Jean Gourdin of the expedition ship Astrolabe. The island was reidentified and charted by the Falkland Islands Dependencies Survey (FIDS) in 1945-47.

=== Column Rock ===
63°11′S 57°19′W. A conspicuous rock pinnacle 1 nautical mile (1.9 km; 1.2 mi) north of Gourdin Island. The descriptive name was applied by the UK Antarctic Place-Names Committee (UK-APC).

=== Zélée Rocks ===
62°57′S 57°15′W. A group of rocks, some of which are above water and others near the surface, lying in Bransfield Strait 17 nautical miles (31 km; 20 mi) north of Prime Head. Discovered by the French expedition, 1837-40, under Captain Jules Dumont d'Urville, and named by him after the expedition ship Zélée.

== Sources ==
- Alberts, Fred G., ed. (1995), Geographic Names of the Antarctic (PDF) (2 ed.), United States Board on Geographic Names This article incorporates public domain material from websites or documents of the United States Board on Geographic Names.
- Graham Land and South Shetland Islands, BAS: British Antarctic Survey, 2005
- Trinity Peninsula (PDF) (Scale 1:250000 topographic map No. 5697), Institut für Angewandte Geodäsie and British Antarctic Survey, 1996, archived from the original (PDF) on 23 September 2015

This article incorporates public domain material from websites or documents of the United States Geological Survey.
