= Mott Snowfield =

Snowfield in the north of Graham Land on the Antarctic Peninsula

- Snowfield
- Coordinates: 63°20′S 57°20′W
- Location: Trinity Peninsula, Graham Land

Mott Snowfield (63°20′S 57°20′W) is a snowfield in the northeast of Trinity Peninsula, Antarctica, between Laclavère Plateau and the Antarctic Sound.

== Location ==
Trinity Peninsula, Antarctic Peninsula. Mott Snowfield towards northeast end

Mott Snowfield is in Graham Land in the north of the Trinity Peninsula, which forms the tip of the Antarctic Peninsula. It is southeast of the Duroch Islands and Schmidt Peninsula, south of Coupvent Point and Prime Head, southwest of Mount Bransfield, northwest of Hope Bay, and northeast of Laclavère Plateau. Named features include Fidase Peak, Magnet Hill and Camel Nunataks.

== Name ==
Mott Snowfield was named by the UK Antarctic Place-Names Committee (UK-APC) for Peter G. Mott, leader of the Falkland Islands and Dependencies Aerial Survey Expedition (FIDASE), 1955–57.

== Features ==
=== Fidase Peak ===
63°23′S 57°33′W. A distinctive peak 9 nautical miles (17 km; 10 mi) east of Mount Jacquinot, rising to 915 metres (3,002 ft) high at the west end of Mott Snowfield. FIDASE represents the initial letters of the Falkland Islands and Dependencies Aerial Survey Expedition (1955-57) led by P.O. Mott.

=== Magnet Hill ===
63°22′S 57°22′W. A small, distinctive snow-covered hill rising from Mott Snowfield, 4 nautical miles (7.4 km; 4.6 mi) northeast of Camel Nunataks. The hill was the site of magnetometer and topographical survey stations and was named by the British geophysical and survey party which worked in this area in 1959.

=== Camel Nunataks ===
63°25′S 57°26′W. Two similar rock nunataks rising to 450 metres (1,480 ft) high, 1 nautical mile (1.9 km; 1.2 mi) apart and 8 nautical miles (15 km; 9.2 mi) north of View Point, Trinity Peninsula. The name is descriptive and has been in use amongst Falkland Islands Dependencies Survey (FIDS) personnel at Hope Bay since about 1959.

=== Yagodina Knoll ===
63°17′16.5″S 57°09′06″W The ice-covered hill rising to 595 metres (1,952 ft) high at the northeast extremity of Trinity Peninsula. Situated 8.21 kilometres (5.10 mi) south-southeast of Siffrey Point, 2.81 kilometres (1.75 mi) west-southwest of Mount Bransfield, 3.85 kilometres (2.39 mi) northwest of Koerner Rock and 22.4 kilometres (13.9 mi) east-northeast of Fidase Peak. Surmounting Mott Snowfield to the southwest. German-British mapping in 1996. Named after the settlement of Yagodina in Southern Bulgaria.

== Sources ==
- Alberts, Fred G., ed. (1995), Geographic Names of the Antarctic (PDF) (2 ed.), United States Board on Geographic Names This article incorporates public domain material from websites or documents of the United States Board on Geographic Names.

REMA Explorer
The Reference Elevation Model of Antarctica (REMA) gives ice surface measurements of most of the continent. When a feature is ice-covered, the ice surface will differ from the underlying rock surface and will change over time. To see ice surface contours and elevation of a feature as of the last REMA update,
- Open the Antarctic REMA Explorer
- Enter the feature's coordinates in the box at the top left that says "Find address or place", then press enter
  The coordinates should be in DMS format, e.g. 65°05'03"S 64°01'02"W. If you only have degrees and minutes, you may not be able to locate the feature.
- Hover over the icons at the left of the screen
- Find "Hillshade" and click on that
  In the bottom right of the screen, set "Shading Factor" to 0 to get a clearer image
- Find "Contour" and click on that
  In the "Contour properties" box, select Contour Interval = 1m
  You can zoom in and out to see the ice surface contours of the feature and nearby features
- Find "Identify" and click on that
  Click the point where the contour lines seem to indicate the top of the feature
  The "Identify" box will appear to the top left. The Orthometric height is the elevation of the ice surface of the feature at this point.

- Antarctic REMA Explorer (Digital Elevation Models created by the Polar Geospatial Center from Maxar imagery), Polar Geospatial Center, University of Minnesota, 2019
- Graham Land and South Shetland Islands, BAS: British Antarctic Survey, 2005
- Trinity Peninsula (PDF) (Scale 1:250000 topographic map No. 5697), Institut für Angewandte Geodäsie and British Antarctic Survey, 1996, archived from the original (PDF) on 23 September 2015
- "Yagodina Knoll", Composite Gazetteer of Antarctica, Scientific Committee on Antarctic Research

This article incorporates public domain material from websites or documents of the United States Geological Survey.
