= Lafond Bay =

Bay in Antarctica

- Location within Antarctica
- Coordinates: 63°27′S 58°10′W
- Type: Bay

Lafond Bay (63°27′S 58°10′W) is a bay, 3 nautical miles (5.6 km; 3.5 mi) wide, which lies south of the Cockerell Peninsula, Trinity Peninsula, Antarctic Peninsula, Antarctica.

== Location ==
Trinity Peninsula, Antarctic Peninsula. Lafond Bay towards northeast end

Lafond Bay is in Graham Land on the north coast of the Trinity Peninsula, which forms the tip of the Antarctic Peninsula. It is east of Bone Bay and west of Huon Bay, from which it is separated by the Cockerell Peninsula and Cape Ducorps. It is southeast of Astrolabe Island, in the Bransfield Strait. The Louis Philippe Plateau is to the south and the Laclavère Plateau is to the southeast.

- Copernix satellite image

== Exploration and name ==
The bay was surveyed by the Falkland Islands Dependencies Survey (FIDS; 1960–61), and was named by the UK Antarctic Place-Names Committee (UK-APC) after Lieutenant Pierre Lafond, a French naval officer on the Astrolabe during her Antarctic voyage (1837–40).

== Features ==
=== Cockerell Peninsula ===
63°24′S 58°08′W. An ice-covered, bulb-shaped peninsula between Lafond Bay and Huon Bay on the north coast of Trinity Peninsula. Discovered by the French Antarctic Expedition, 1837-40, under Captain Jules Dumont d'Urville. Named in 1977 by the UK-APC after Sir Christopher (Sydney) Cockerell, British pioneer of the hovercraft.

=== Cape Ducorps ===
63°23′S 58°09′W. A point marking the north end of Cockerell Peninsula on the north coast of Trinity Peninsula. Discovered by a French expedition, 1837-40, under Captain Jules Dumont d'Urville, and named by him for Louis Ducorps, a member of the expedition.

=== Sestrimo Glacier ===
63°30′S 58°08′W. The 11 kilometres (6.8 mi) long and 4 kilometres (2.5 mi) wide glacier on Trinity Peninsula east of Mount D'Urville. Flowing northwards to enter Bransfield Strait at Lafond Bay. Named after the settlement of Sestrimo in Southern Bulgaria.

== Nearby features ==
=== Peralta Rocks ===
63°16′S 58°08′W. A group of about eight small rocks covering an area 4 by 2 nautical miles (7.4 by 3.7 km; 4.6 by 2.3 mi), lying 7 nautical miles (13 km; 8.1 mi) N of Cape Ducorps. Named by the Chilean Antarctic Expedition, 1949-50, for Lt. Roberto Peralta Bell, second-in-command of the oil tanker Lientur.

=== Tupinier Islands ===
63°22′S 58°16′W. Group of pyramid-shaped islands lying off the north coast of Trinity Peninsula, about 3 nautical miles (5.6 km; 3.5 mi) west of Cape Ducorps. Discovered by the French expedition under Captain Jules Dumont d'Urville, 1837-40, and named after the Baron Tupinier (1779-1850), an official of the French Navy Dept. who was instrumental in obtaining government support for the expedition. The islands were recharted by the FIDS, 1946.

=== Molina Rocks ===
63°22′S 58°27′W. A small group of rocks 4 nautical miles (7.4 km; 4.6 mi) west of Tupinier Islands. The name appears on a Chilean government chart of 1951.

== Sources ==
- Alberts, Fred G., ed. (1995), Geographic Names of the Antarctic (PDF) (2 ed.), United States Board on Geographic Names This article incorporates public domain material from websites or documents of the United States Board on Geographic Names.
- Graham Land and South Shetland Islands, BAS: British Antarctic Survey, 2005
- "Sestrimo Glacier", Composite Gazetteer of Antarctica, Scientific Committee on Antarctic Research

This article incorporates public domain material from websites or documents of the United States Geological Survey.
