= Gourdin Island =

Island of Antarctica

- Location within Antarctica

Geography
- Location: Antarctica
- Coordinates: 63°12′S 57°18′W

Administration
- Administered under the Antarctic Treaty System

Demographics
- Population: Uninhabited

Gourdin Island is the largest island (124 ha) in a group of islands and rocks 2 km (1 nmi) north of Prime Head, the northern tip of the Antarctic Peninsula. It was discovered by a French expedition, 1837–40, under Captain Jules Dumont d'Urville, and named by him for Ensign Jean Gourdin of the expedition ship Astrolabe. The island was reidentified and charted by the Falkland Islands Dependencies Survey in 1945–47.

== Important Bird Area ==
The island has been identified as an Important Bird Area (IBA) by BirdLife International because it supports a large breeding colony of about 14,000 pairs of Adélie penguins, as well as over 550 pairs of gentoo penguins.

== See also ==
- Column Rock
- List of Antarctic and subantarctic islands
