= Chilean Antarctic Expedition =

Expedition in 1947

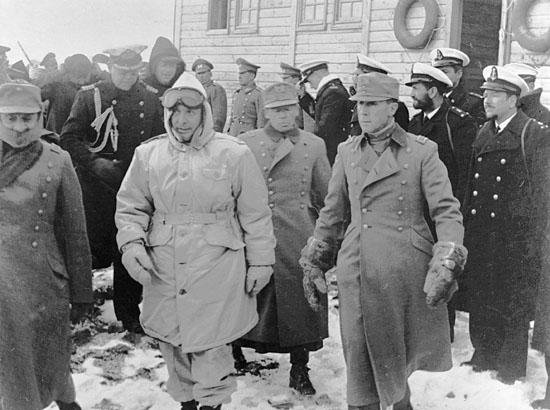
Chilean President Gabriel González Videla inaugurating the Base General Bernardo O'Higgins Riquelme, February 1948

The First Chilean Antarctic Expedition (1947–1948) was an expedition to Antarctica mounted by the Chilean government and military to enforce its territorial claims against British challenges, namely Operation Tabarin.

Among other accomplishments the expedition established Base General Bernardo O'Higgins Riquelme on February 18, 1948. Chilean President Gabriel González Videla personally inaugurated the base, thereby becoming the first head of state to set foot on the continent. The inactive research station González Videla Antarctic Base is named in his honor. The O'Higgins Base is still operated by the Chilean Army, one of the Antarctic bases with the longest times of continuous operation.

The expedition was led by Commodore Federico Guesalaga Toro. The German-Chilean Hans Helfritz served as the expedition's official photographer.

== Features named by the expedition ==
- Ferrer Rocks, named after Lieutenant Fernando Ferrer Fouga, hydrographic officer
