= Base General Bernardo O'Higgins Riquelme =

O'Higgins Station
- Antarctic base
- Base General Bernardo O'Higgins Riquelme
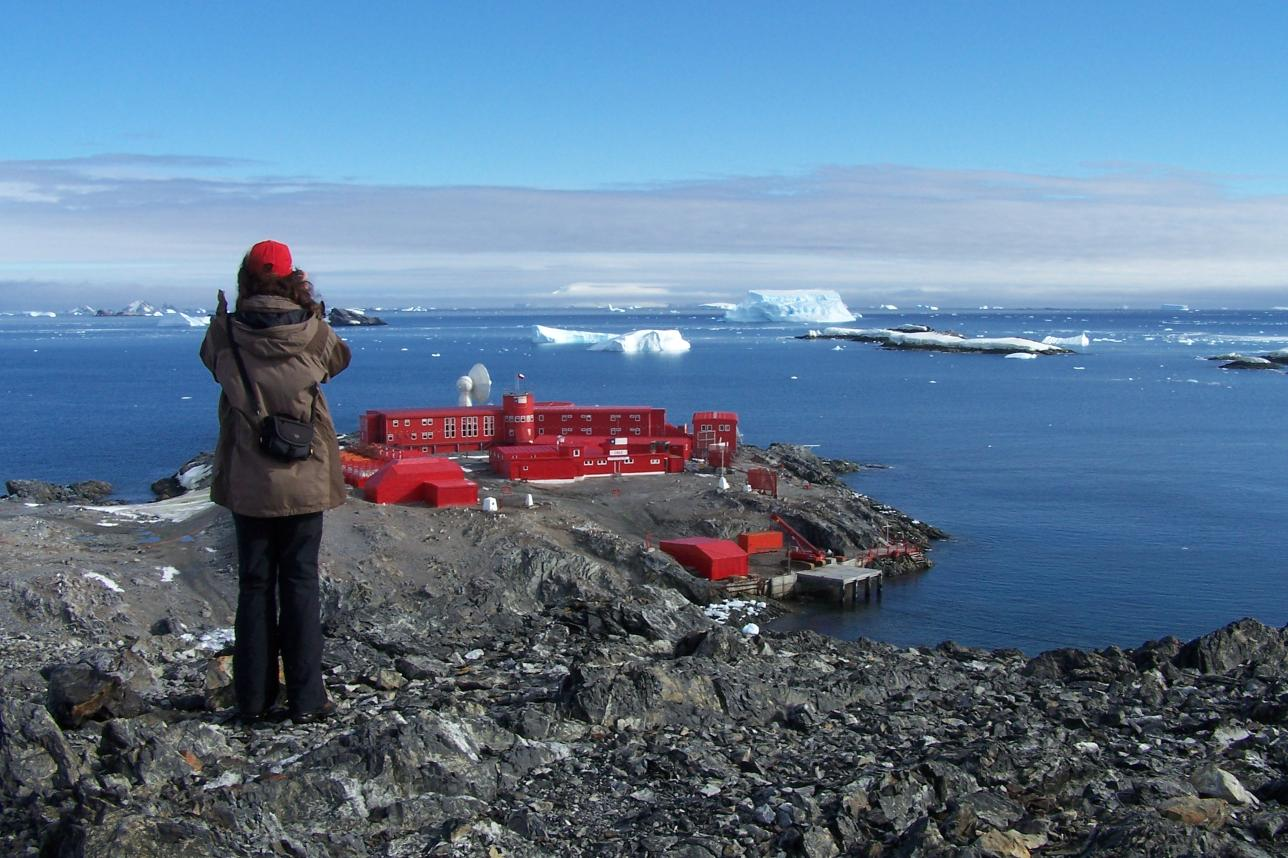
- The Chilean base Bernardo O'Higgins Station

- Location of O'Higgins Station in Antarctica
- Coordinates: 63°19′15″S 57°53′59″W
- Country: Chile
- Location in Antarctica: Cape Legoupil; Trinity Peninsula
- Administered by: Chilean Army
- Established: 18 February 1948
- Named for: Bernardo O'Higgins
- Elevation: 12 m (39 ft)

Population (2017)
  - Summer: 52
  - Winter: 24
- UN/LOCODE: AQ OHG
- Type: All-year round
- Period: Annual
- Status: Operational
- Activities: List: Geology; Glaciology; Marine biology

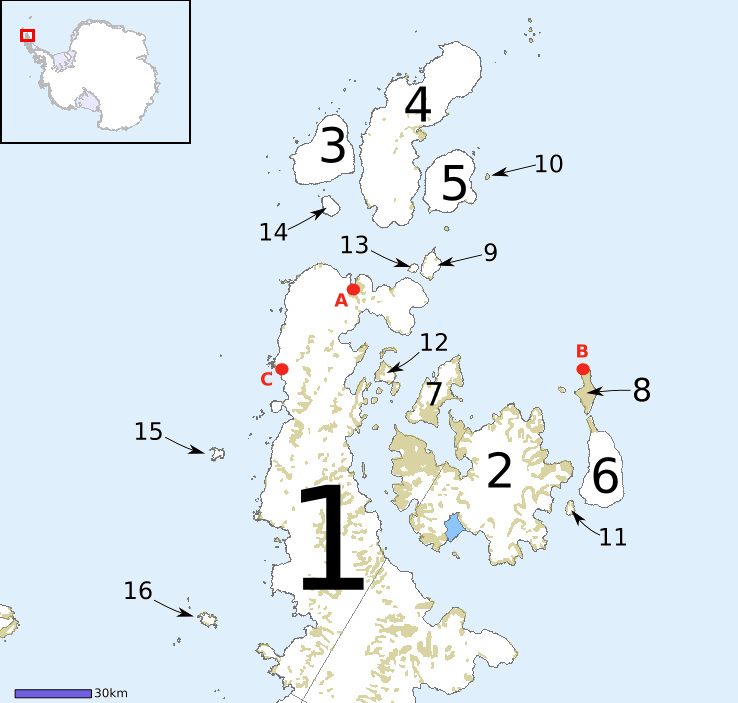
Map with station at location marked "C"

Base General Bernardo O'Higgins Riquelme, also Base Libertador General Bernardo O'Higgins Riquelme, or shortly Bernardo O'Higgins, named after Bernardo O'Higgins, is a permanently staffed Chilean research station in Antarctica and the capital of Antártica Commune. It lies at an elevation of 13 m, about 30 km south-west of Prime Head, the northernmost point of the Antarctic Peninsula, at Cape Legoupil.

== History ==
The commander-in-chief of the Army, Ramón Cañas Montalva, entrusted General Eduardo Saavedra Rojas with planning the construction of the base. The base was established on 18 February 1948 by the Chilean Antarctic Expedition, and is one of the Antarctic bases with the longest times of continuous operation. The winter population is 24, and the peak population in the Antarctic summer is usually 52, although up to 60 persons can be accommodated. The base is operated by the Chilean Army. It is also known as Puerto Covadonga after the port on which it is located.

The German Antarctic Receiving Station (GARS) was established at O'Higgins in 1991 by the DLR. It is a satellite ground station sited in Antarctica to enable reception of data from satellite-based sensors within the south polar region that might otherwise be lost. High bandwidth sensors such as SAR generate too much data to be stored on board the satellite for transmission to ground stations elsewhere. GARS was sited at O'Higgins because of the geology, infrastructure and accessibility of the base.

Three dozen COVID-19 cases were reported on the research base on December 22, 2020. These are the first reported cases on the continent.

=== Historic site ===
The O’Higgins Historic Site on Cape Legoupil comprises structures of historical significance:

- The original base was established on 18 February 1948 by the President of the Republic of Chile, Gabriel González Videla, the first head of state in the world to visit Antarctica.
- The Capitán General Bernardo O ́Higgins Riquelme Bust was erected in 1948 opposite the base.
- A plaque was erected on 12 August 1957 in memory of Lieutenants Oscar Inostroza Contreras and Sergio Ponce Torrealba.
- The Virgen del Carmen Grotto, near the base, was built in the early 1970s to serve as a place of spiritual withdrawal for the staff of various Antarctic stations and expeditions.

It was designated a Historic Site or Monument (HSM 37), following a proposal by Chile to the Antarctic Treaty Consultative Meeting.

== Climate ==
Bernardo O'Higgins Base experiences a borderline polar tundra climate (Köppen ET) that is extremely close to a polar ice cap climate (Köppen EF). Average annual precipitation amounts to 771 mm (30.35 in), and is distributed fairly evenly throughout the year, typically peaking marginally during the austral spring. Temperatures are frigid all year round; the warmest month is January with an average monthly temperature of 1 °C (34 °F), while the coldest month is July with an average monthly temperature of −9 °C (16 °F).

Climate data for Bernardo O'Higgins Base, elevation: 10 m or 33 ft, (1991–2020 normals, extremes 1953–present)
Month	Jan	Feb	Mar	Apr	May	Jun	Jul	Aug	Sep	Oct	Nov	Dec	Year
Record high °C (°F)	10.9 (51.6)	8.5 (47.3)	8.3 (46.9)	6.2 (43.2)	7.2 (45.0)	5.9 (42.6)	3.8 (38.8)	3.5 (38.3)	4.4 (39.9)	6.6 (43.9)	9.2 (48.6)	9.0 (48.2)	10.9 (51.6)
Mean daily maximum °C (°F)	2.3 (36.1)	1.7 (35.1)	0.5 (32.9)	−1.5 (29.3)	−2.7 (27.1)	−4.8 (23.4)	−5.3 (22.5)	−4.9 (23.2)	−3.4 (25.9)	−1.9 (28.6)	−0.2 (31.6)	1.3 (34.3)	−1.6 (29.1)
Daily mean °C (°F)	0.9 (33.6)	0.5 (32.9)	−1.2 (29.8)	−3.3 (26.1)	−4.8 (23.4)	−7.1 (19.2)	−7.9 (17.8)	−7.4 (18.7)	−5.7 (21.7)	−3.7 (25.3)	−1.7 (28.9)	0.0 (32.0)	−3.5 (25.7)
Mean daily minimum °C (°F)	−0.6 (30.9)	−1.0 (30.2)	−2.9 (26.8)	−5.1 (22.8)	−6.9 (19.6)	−9.4 (15.1)	−10.3 (13.5)	−10.0 (14.0)	−7.9 (17.8)	−5.5 (22.1)	−3.1 (26.4)	−1.4 (29.5)	−5.4 (22.3)
Record low °C (°F)	−10.1 (13.8)	−14.0 (6.8)	−20.0 (−4.0)	−25.0 (−13.0)	−30.0 (−22.0)	−34.2 (−29.6)	−34.4 (−29.9)	−33.2 (−27.8)	−29.2 (−20.6)	−26.0 (−14.8)	−15.0 (5.0)	−10.6 (12.9)	−34.4 (−29.9)
Average precipitation mm (inches)	41.4 (1.63)	51.4 (2.02)	62.4 (2.46)	52.0 (2.05)	43.0 (1.69)	40.0 (1.57)	42.0 (1.65)	42.7 (1.68)	47.2 (1.86)	54.6 (2.15)	44.7 (1.76)	37.0 (1.46)	558.3 (21.98)
Average relative humidity (%)	83.3	85.8	86.2	84.6	86.2	85.8	86.3	85.6	86.2	84.8	83.5	83.2	85.1
Mean monthly sunshine hours	84.0	72.5	58.3	36.1	16.0	5.7	10.2	35.9	46.8	82.6	101.1	105.4	601.1
Source: Dirección Meteorológica de Chile

== See also ==
O'Higgins Skiway
- IATA: none; ICAO: none

Summary
- Airport type: Private
- Location: General Bernardo O'Higgins Riquelme Station
- Elevation AMSL: 648 ft (198 m)
- Coordinates: 63°20′34″S 57°49′23″W

Map
- Location of airfield in Antarctica

Runways
Direction	Length		Surface
Direction	ft	m	Surface
	2,625	800	Ice

- Research stations in Antarctica
- List of Antarctic field camps
- Airports in Antarctica
