= Ophelia (disambiguation) =

Ophelia is a character from William Shakespeare's Hamlet.

Ophelia or Ofelia may also refer to:

== Arts and media ==
=== Film and television ===
- Ophélia (1963 film)
- Ophelia (2018 film)
- "Ophelia", an episode of Ergo Proxy

=== Music ===
==== Bands ====
- The Ophelias (California band), a San Francisco neo-psychedelic band of the late 1980s
- The Ophelias (Ohio band), an American rock band

==== Songs ====
- "Ophelia" (The Band song), 1975
- "Ophelia" (The Lumineers song), 2016
- "Ophelia", by Dawnstar, 2013
- "Ophelia", by Kashmir from No Balance Palace, 2005
- "Ophelia", by Kaya, 2009
- "Ophelia", by Kula Shaker from Pilgrims Progress, 2010
- "Ophelia", by L'Arc-en-Ciel from Awake, 2005
- "Ophelia", by Natalie Merchant from Ophelia, 1998
- "Ophelia", by Nikola Šarčević from Freedom to Roam, 2013
- "Ophélia", by Nolwenn Leroy from Ô Filles de l'Eau, 2012
- "Ophelia", by Peter Hammill from Sitting Targets, 1981
- "Ophelia", by PinkPantheress from Heaven Knows, 2023
- "Ophelia", by Tear Garden from Tired Eyes Slowly Burning, 1987
- "Ophelia", by Tori Amos from Abnormally Attracted to Sin, 2009

==== Other uses in music ====
- Ophelia Records, a record label by American musician Seven Lions
- Ophelia (album), by Natalie Merchant, 1998

=== Paintings ===
- The Death of Ophelia (Delacroix), 1838, by Eugène Delacroix
- Ophelia Weaving Her Garlands, 1842, by Richard Redgrave
- Ophelia (Millais), 1852, by John Everett Millais
- Ophelia (first version), a circa 1853 oil on panel by Arthur Hughes
- Ophelia (And will he not come again?) (second version), a circa 1867 oil on canvas by Arthur Hughes
- Ophelia (Pause for Thought), 1870, by Pierre Auguste Cot
- Ophelia, 1880, by Madeleine Lemaire
- Ophelia, an 1882 oil on canvas by Jules-Élie Delaunay
- Ophelia (Cabanel), 1883, by Alexandre Cabanel
- Ophelia (Waterhouse), 1894, by John William Waterhouse
- Ophelia, 1895, by Paul Steck
- Ophelia (Heyser), a circa 1900 painting by Friedrich Heyser
- Ophelia Among the Flowers, a 1905-08 painting by Odilon Redon
- Ophelia (Brockhurst), a 1937 painting by Gerald Brockhurst
- The Useless Dress, 1964, by Leonor Fini
- Ophelia’s Death, a 1967 watercolor painting by Salvador Dali which was later part of his Hamlet Series (1973-1974)

=== Sculpture ===
- Ophelia, an 1880 marble relief by Sarah Bernhardt

== People ==
- Ophelia (given name), including a list of people and characters with the name Ophelia or Ofelia
- Flora Ofelia (born 2005), Danish singer and actress

== Places ==
=== On Earth ===
- Ophelia, Virginia, US, an unincorporated community
- Ofelia Island, Graham Land, Antarctica
- Ofelia Plads, a public area in Copenhagen, Denmark

=== In space ===
- Ophelia (moon), a moon of Uranus
- 171 Ophelia, an asteroid

== Ships ==
- HMS Ophelia, a Royal Navy M-class destroyer launched in 1915
- German hospital ship Ophelia, a German hospital ship completed in 1912

== Other uses ==
- List of storms named Ophelia or Ofelia
