= Ambush (disambiguation) =

An ambush is a military tactic.

Ambush or The Ambush may also refer to:

== Music ==
- Ambush (band), Canadian country music band, or their album
- Ambush (Marc Benno album), 1972
- Ambush (Tygers of Pan Tang album), 2012
- Ambush, a song by OFB, from the album Frontstreet
- Ambush (rapper), from London, UK
- Ambush, a 1967 song by Maria Dallas

== Film ==
- Ambush (1939 film), directed by Kurt Neumann
- Ambush (1950 film), directed by Sam Wood
- The Ambush (1969 film), originally titled Zaseda
- The Ambush: Incident at Blood Pass, a 1970 Japanese drama film
- Ambush (1973 film), originally titled 埋伏
- Ambush (1988 film), starring Ronnie Ricketts
- Ambush (1999 film), a Finnish war film
- Al Kameen, a 2021 Emirati film released in English as The Ambush
- Ambush (2023 film), an American war film

== TV episodes ==
- "Ambush" (CSI: Miami)
- "Ambush" (ER)
- "Ambush" (Star Wars: The Clone Wars)
- "The Ambush" (Doctor Who episode), fourth episode of the 1963–64 serial The Daleks

== Ships ==
- HMS Ambush, two Royal Navy submarines
- French frigate L'Ambuscade

== Other ==
- Ambush (G.I. Joe), a fictional character in the G.I. Joe universe
- Ambush!, a board game by Avalon Hill
- AMBUSH, a fashion brand from Korean-American designer Yoon Ahn

== See also ==
- Ambush Bay (Antarctica)
- Ambush predator, an animal that waits for prey to approach instead of actively pursuing
