= Ophelia (Heyser) =

Painting by Friedrich Heyser

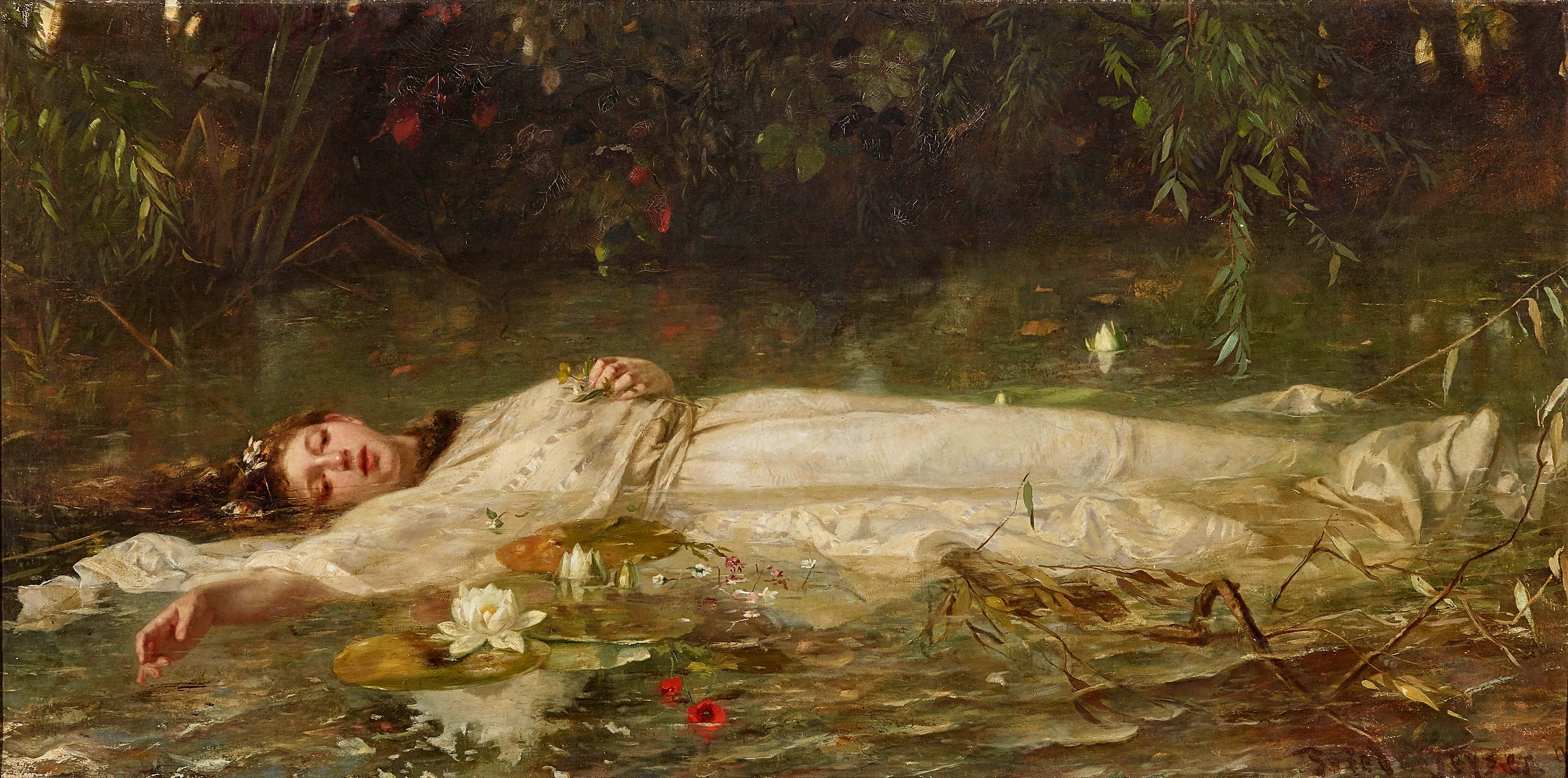
- Artist: Friedrich Heyser
- Year: c. 1900
- Medium: Oil on canvas
- Dimensions: 90.5 cm × 181.5 cm (35.6 in × 71.5 in)
- Location: Museum Wiesbaden, Wiesbaden

Ophelia is a c. 1900 oil painting by German artist Friedrich Heyser. It measures 90.5 cm × 181.5 cm (35.6 in × 71.5 in). It depicts the death by drowning of Ophelia, described in Act IV of William Shakespeare's play Hamlet. She is floating in a long white dress, among flowers and leaves of a river. The composition draws inspiration from the 1851–52 painting by the Pre-Raphaelite artist John Everett Millais.

== History ==
The painting was sold at auction in Munich in 2017, and acquired that year by Museum Wiesbaden as part of the Art Nouveau and Symbolist collection of Ferdinand Wolfgang Neess.

== Inspiration ==
The painting that inspired Heyser is known for its depiction of the detailed flora of the river and the riverbank, stressing the patterns of growth and decay in a natural ecosystem. Despite its nominal Danish setting, the landscape has come to be seen as quintessentially English. Ophelia was painted along the banks of the Hogsmill River in Surrey, near Tolworth. Barbara Webb, a resident of nearby Old Malden, devoted much time to finding the exact placement of the picture, and according to her research, the scene is located at Six Acre Meadow, alongside Church Road, Old Malden. Millais Road is now nearby. Millais's close colleague William Holman Hunt was at the time working on his The Hireling Shepherd nearby.

The flowers shown floating on the river were chosen to correspond with Shakespeare's description of Ophelia's garland. They also reflect the Victorian interest in the "language of flowers", according to which each flower carries a symbolic meaning. The prominent red poppy—not mentioned by Shakespeare's description of the scene—represents sleep and death. In comparison, the Heyser painting keeps the emphasis on flora and the water, but adjusts the bower that surronds the figure to be less claustrophobic.

== Themes ==
The painting depicts Ophelia singing while floating in a river just before she drowns. The scene is described in Act IV, Scene VII of Hamlet in a speech by Queen Gertrude.

The episode depicted is not usually seen onstage, as in Shakespeare's text it exists only in Gertrude's description. Out of her mind with grief, Ophelia has been making garlands of wildflowers. She climbs into a willow tree overhanging a brook to dangle some from its branches, and a bough breaks beneath her. She lies in the water singing songs, as if unaware of her danger ("incapable of her own distress"). Her clothes, trapping air, have allowed her to temporarily stay afloat ("Her clothes spread wide, / And, mermaid-like, awhile they bore her up."). But eventually, "her garments, heavy with their drink, / Pull'd the poor wretch from her melodious lay" down "to muddy death".

Ophelia's death has been praised as one of the most poetically written death scenes in literature.

== In popular culture ==
The painting attracted attention in 2025 when it was identified as an inspiration for the opening scene of the video for "The Fate of Ophelia", the lead single from Taylor Swift's album The Life of a Showgirl. Following the release of Swift's music video, hundreds of fans flocked to the Museum Wiesbaden in Wiesbaden, Germany, to view Ophelia, the first painting recreated in the video.

== See also ==
- Ophelia, 1894 John William Waterhouse painting
