= Vayne =

Vayne is a surname. Notable people with the surname include:

- Jan Vayne (born 1966), Dutch pianist
- Ian Vayne (born 1962), Australian Opera Singer
- Kyra Vayne (1916–2001), Russian-born British opera singer

== See also ==
- Vayne Solidor, the main antagonist in the video game Final Fantasy XII
- Shauna Vayne, the Night Hunter, a playable champion character in the multiplayer online battle arena video game League of Legends
