= Ambushed =

Ambushed may refer to:

- Ambushed (album), a 1994 album by Da Bush Babees
- Ambushed (2013 film), a 2013 film directed by Giorgio Serafini and starring Dolph Lundgren
- Ambushed (1998 film), a 1998 American action thriller film
- "Ambushed," a song by French electronic group Telepopmusik from their album Angel Milk

== See also ==
- Ambush (disambiguation)
