= Mignon Nevada =

English operatic soprano

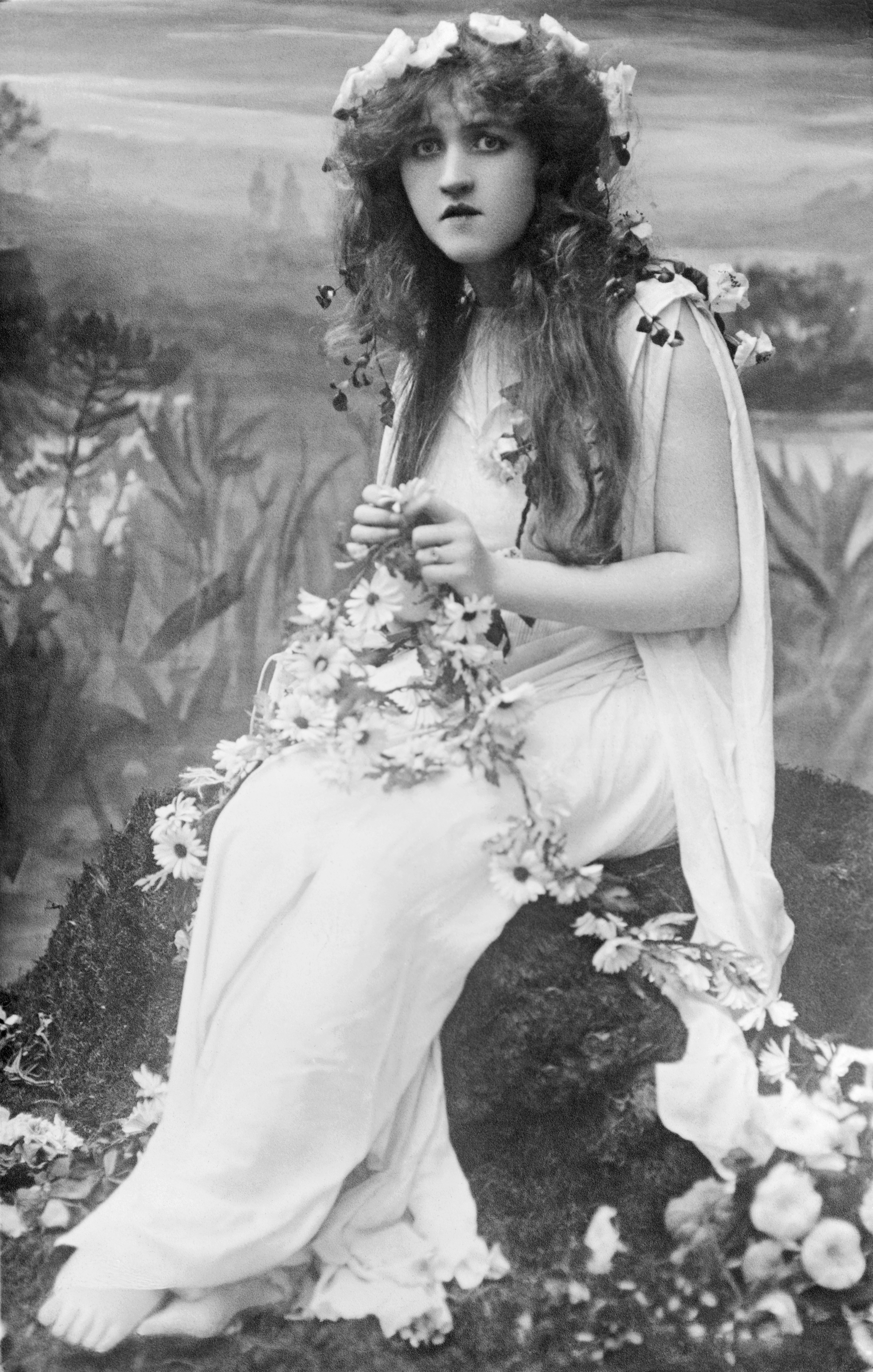
Mignon Nevada as Ophelia in Ambroise Thomas's opera, Hamlet, circa 1910.

Mignon Nevada (14 August 1886 – 25 June 1971) was an English operatic soprano. She was born in Paris, daughter of the American operatic soprano Emma Nevada and her English husband Raymond Palmer. She was named after the title character of the 1866 opera Mignon, written by her godfather, French composer Ambroise Thomas. Her voice was light and agile, and her mother trained her to be a coloratura soprano, although Sir Thomas Beecham thought this was a mistake and she should have been a mezzo-soprano instead.

== Career ==
Her debut was in February 1908 at the Teatro Costanzi in Rome as Rosina in Rossini's Il barbiere di Siviglia. The New York Times reported that her mother's friends, Adelina Patti and Mary Garden travelled all the way to Rome just to attend Mignon's debut. Her performances were so well received that she was engaged to sing eight more times beyond her original four performances. Her success led her mother to request an audience for Mignon with Pope Pius X. (Her mother had had an audience with Leo XIII ten years prior.)

Mignon made other early appearances in Italy and Portugal and then made her way to England where she appeared as Ophelia in Thomas' Hamlet under Thomas Beecham at the opening of the 1910 winter season at Covent Garden. Mignon sang the title role in Delibes' Lakmé at the London Opera House during the Allied Opera Season in June 1915. In 1917 she appeared as Desdemona in Verdi's Otello with Frank Mullings in the title role and Frederic Austin as Iago. Beecham described her portrayal of Desdemona as "the best I have seen on any stage." Her other roles in London included Olympia in Offenbach's The Tales of Hoffmann, Zerlina in Mozart's Don Giovanni, and Marguerite in Gounod's Faust. Her last appearance there was in 1922.

Other venues included the Opéra-Comique in Paris in 1920 (in the title role of Lakmé by Delibes and as Mimì in Puccini's La bohème), La Scala in Milan in 1923, and the Opéra in Paris in 1932. She also appeared at the Royal Opera in Lisbon, at the Aldwych Theatre in London, and with the Royal Philharmonic Society.

Later in her career she became a vocal teacher. One of her students was Kyra Vayne. She died in Long Melford.

== Recordings ==
In 1938 Mignon Nevada made a recording of "Le Soir", a song by Ambroise Thomas which had been given its premiere by her mother. This is the only recording which she is known to have made. It was first issued on a 12-inch 78 rpm record (International Record Collector's Club 118) with a spoken introduction by her mother and reissued on LP ca. 1965 on the same label as part of a compilation (cat. no. IRCC L-7025). Raymond Ericson of The New York Times described her performance of it as quite charming. The LP also included Schumann's Frauenliebe und Leben, sung by Julia Culp (1910); "Casta diva" from Bellini's Norma and "Non mi dir" from Mozart's Don Giovanni, both sung by Frieda Hempel; "Printemps qui commence" from Saint-Saëns' Samson et Dalila, sung by Kathleen Howard; "Regal in His Low Estate" from Goldmark's The Queen of Sheba, sung by Marie Rappold; and an aria from Massenet's Thaîs, a song by Bemberg, and two settings by Reynaldo Hahn of poems from Robert Louis Stevenson's A Child's Garden of Verses, all sung by Mary Garden. All of the recordings date from 1910 to 1938.

== Sources ==
- The Annual Register: A Review of Public Events at Home and Abroad for the Year 1916. London: Longmans, Green and Co. 1917. OCLC 284262822. "Mignon Nevada."
- Hughes, Edwin (1909). The World To-Day: A Monthly Record of Human Progress, Volume XVII. Chicago: World Review Company. p. 832.
- Sadie, Stanley, ed. (1992). The New Grove Dictionary of Opera (4 volumes). London: Macmillan. ISBN 978-1-56159-228-9.
