= Ophelia =

Character in Shakespeare's drama Hamlet

- Hamlet character
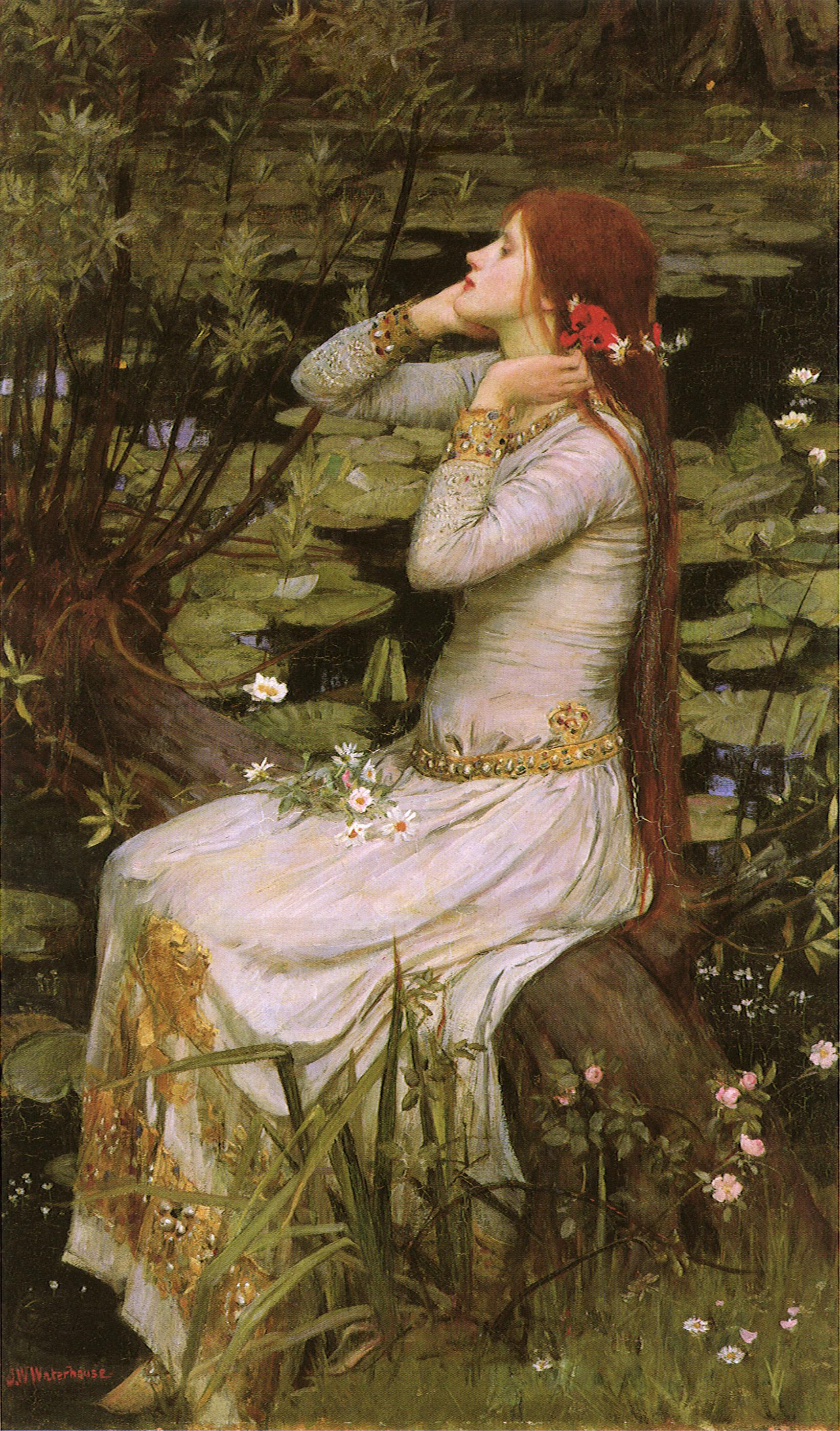
- John William Waterhouse's painting Ophelia (1894)
- Created by: William Shakespeare
- Based on: Amleth's foster-sister (Amleth legend)
- Portrayed by: Boy players (Elizabethan era); Mary Catherine Bolton; Sarah Siddons; Elizabeth Satchell; Helen Faucit; Dora Jordan; Frances Abington; Dorothy Foster; Jean Simmons; Peg Woffington; Mignon Nevada; Anastasiya Vertinskaya; Marianne Faithfull; Helena Bonham Carter; Kate Winslet; Julia Stiles; Mariah Gale; Daisy Ridley; Jessica Brown Findlay; Morfydd Clark; Namsrayn Suvd; Shraddha Kapoor; Olga Gzovskaya; Linda Marsh

In-universe information
- Position: Noblewoman
- Family: Polonius (father); Laertes (brother)
- Significant other: Prince Hamlet
- Religion: Catholic
- Nationality: Danish

Ophelia (/oʊˈfiːliə/ oh-FEE-lee-ə) is a character in William Shakespeare's drama Hamlet (1599–1601). She is a young noblewoman of Denmark, the daughter of Polonius, sister of Laertes and potential wife of Prince Hamlet. Polonius convinces Ophelia to spurn Hamlet, and he is later killed by Hamlet. After her father's death at the hands of Hamlet, Ophelia goes mad, and ultimately drowns in the river.

== Name ==
Like most characters in Hamlet, despite the plot taking place in Denmark, Ophelia's name is not of Danish origin. It first appeared in Jacopo Sannazaro's 1504 poem Arcadia (as Ofelia), probably derived from Ancient Greek ὠφέλεια (ōphéleia, "benefit").

== Origins ==
The character of Ophelia is original to Shakespeare, but is believed to be inspired by an episode in Saxo Grammaticus' Amleth (c. 1200), one of the sources of Hamlet, in which Prince Amleth feigns idiocy and his (unnamed) foster-sister is offered to him as a temptation.

Ophelia's drowning while making flower garlands is possibly inspired by a real event: a 1569 coroner's report, discovered by historians in 2011, mentions the accidental drowning of 2 1/2-year-old Jane Shaxspere in Upton Warren, a village 19 mi (31 km) northwest of Stratford-upon-Avon. She fell into a water channel while picking corn marigolds, and her surname suggests she could have been a relative of Shakespeare (English names were not consistently spelled at the time, and the playwright's name appears as Shaxpere in documents). Shakespeare was 5 years old at the time of Jane's drowning.

== Character ==
Ophelia is obedient to her father and well-loved by many characters. When Polonius tells her to stop seeing Hamlet, she does so. When he tells her to set up a meeting so that he and Claudius can spy on him, she does so. Ophelia is a foil to Hamlet and Laertes, contrasting and inspiring their behaviour. Ophelia and Hamlet's mother, Queen Gertrude, are the only two female characters in the play.

== Plot ==
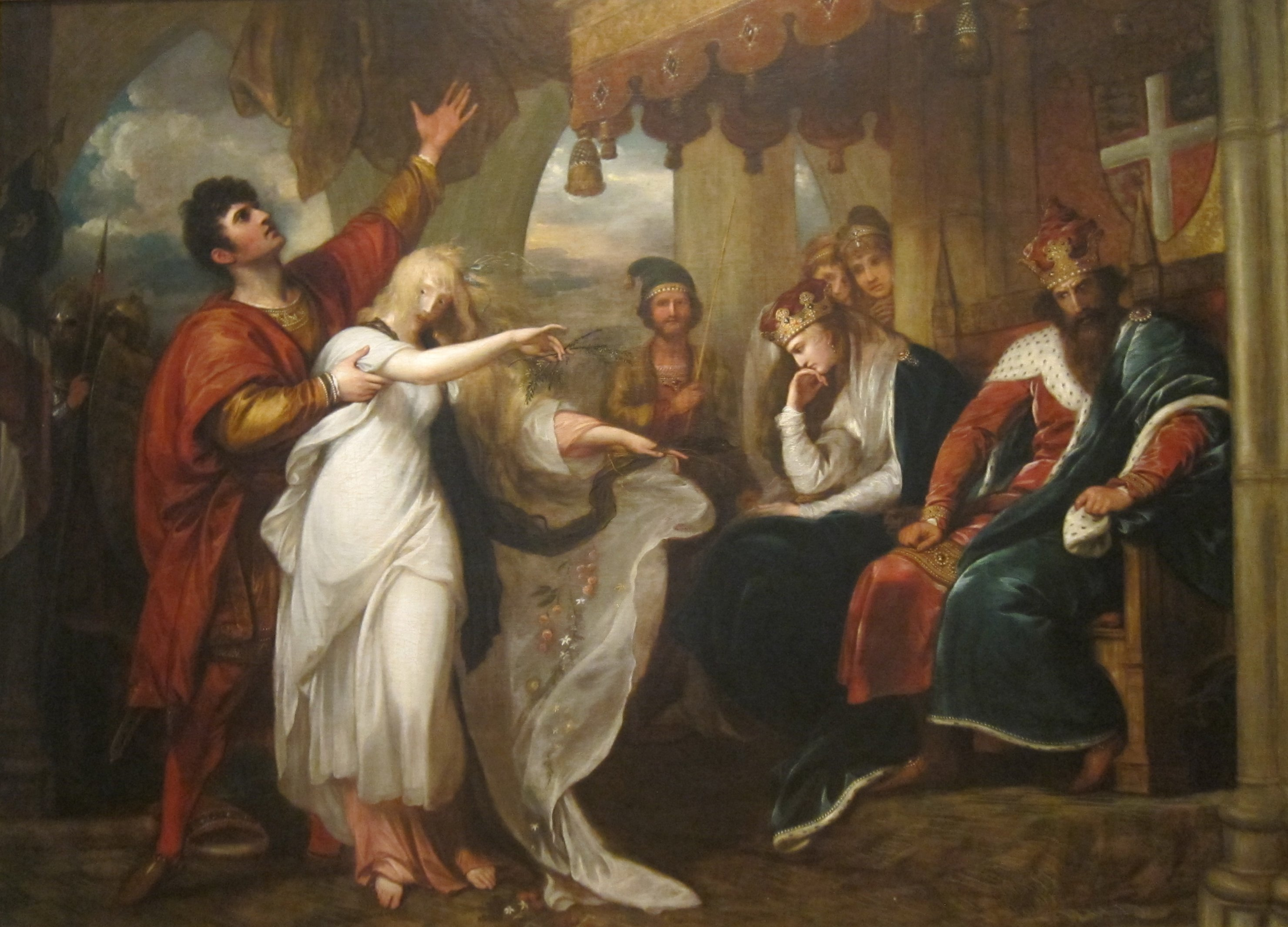
Hamlet, Act IV, Scene V (Ophelia Before the King and Queen), Benjamin West, 1792

In Ophelia's first speaking appearance in the play, she is seen with her brother, Laertes, who is leaving for France. Laertes warns her that Hamlet, the heir to the throne of Denmark, does not have the freedom to marry whomever he wants. Ophelia's father, Polonius, who enters while Laertes is leaving, also forbids Ophelia from pursuing Hamlet, as Polonius fears that Hamlet is not earnest about her.

In Ophelia's next appearance, she tells Polonius that Hamlet rushed into her room with his clothing askew and a "hellish" expression on his face; he only stared at her, nodding three times without speaking to her. Based on what Ophelia told him, Polonius concludes that he was wrong to forbid Ophelia from seeing Hamlet, and that Hamlet must be mad with love for her. Polonius immediately decides to go to Claudius, the new King of Denmark and also Hamlet's uncle and stepfather, about the situation. Polonius later suggests to Claudius that they hide behind an arras to overhear Hamlet speaking to Ophelia, when Hamlet thinks the conversation is private. Since Polonius is now sure that Hamlet is lovesick for Ophelia, he thinks Hamlet will express his love for her. Claudius agrees to try the eavesdropping plan later.

The plan leads to what is commonly called the "Nunnery Scene", from its use of the term nunnery which would generally refer to a convent, but at the time was also popular slang for a brothel. (Note: See Hamlet#Language) Polonius instructs Ophelia to stand in the lobby of the castle while he and Claudius hide. Hamlet approaches Ophelia and talks to her, saying "Get thee to a nunnery." Hamlet asks Ophelia where her father is; she lies to him, saying her father must be at home. Hamlet realises he is being spied upon. He exits after declaring, "I say we will have no more marriages." Ophelia is left bewildered and heartbroken, sure that Hamlet is insane. After Hamlet storms out, Ophelia makes her "O, what a noble mind is here o'erthrown" soliloquy.

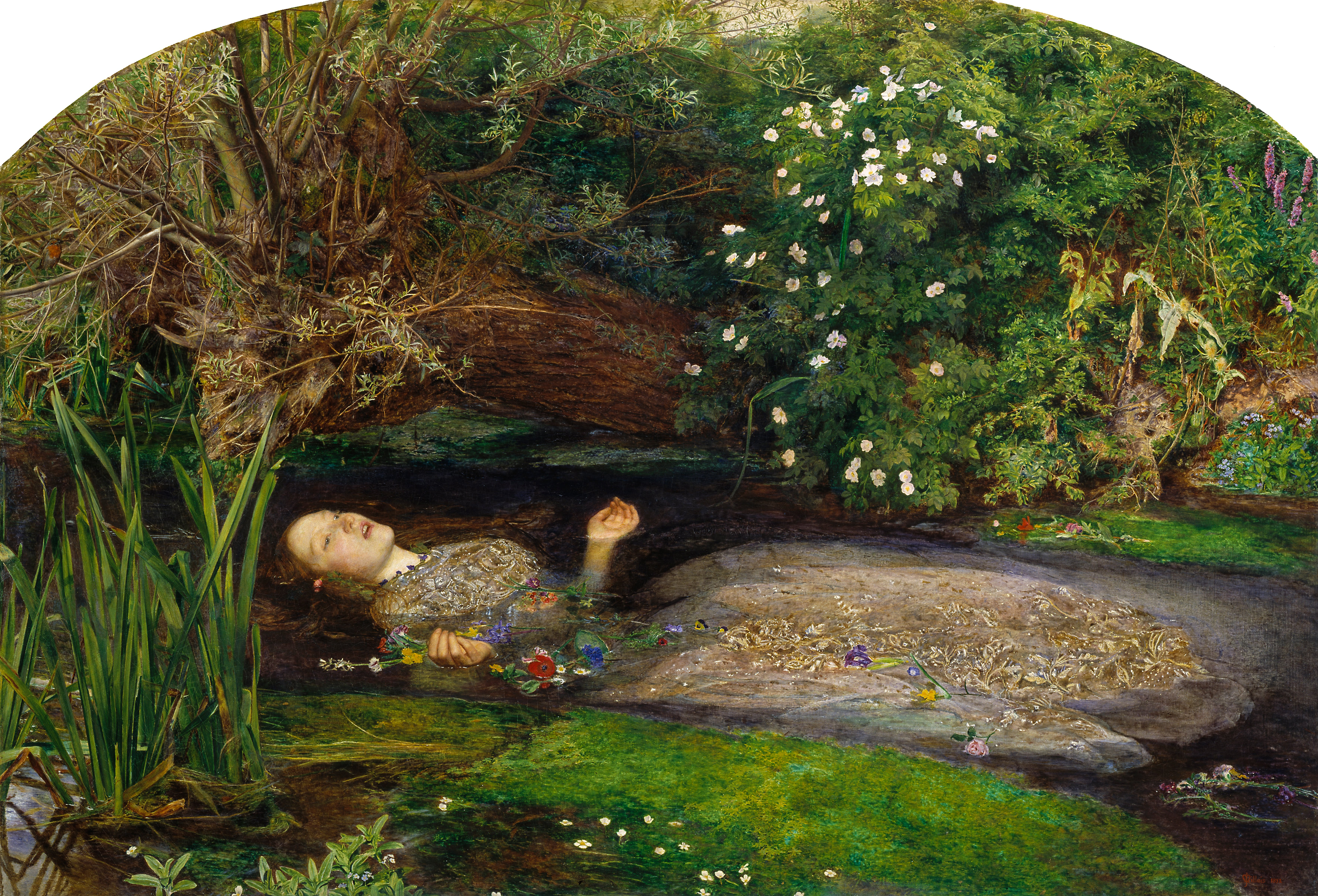
Ophelia by John Everett Millais (1852) is part of the collection of Tate Britain. His painting influenced the image in Kenneth Branagh's film Hamlet.

The next time Ophelia appears is at the Mousetrap Play, which Hamlet has arranged to try to prove that Claudius killed King Hamlet. Hamlet sits with Ophelia and makes sexually suggestive remarks; he also says that woman's love is brief.

Later that night, after the play, Hamlet kills Polonius during a private meeting between Hamlet and his mother, Queen Gertrude. At Ophelia's next appearance, after her father's death, she has gone mad, due to what the other characters interpret as grief for her father. She talks in riddles and rhymes, and sings some "mad" and bawdy songs about death and a maiden losing her virginity. She exits after bidding everyone a "good night".

The last time Ophelia appears in the play is after Laertes comes to the castle to challenge Claudius over the death of his father, Polonius. Ophelia sings more songs and hands out flowers, citing their symbolic meanings, although interpretations of the meanings differ. The only herb that Ophelia gives to herself is rue: "...there's rue for you, and here's some for me; we may call it herb of grace o' Sundays; O, you must wear your rue with a difference". Rue is well known for its symbolic meaning of regret, but the herb is also used to treat pain, bruises and has long been known to induce abortion.

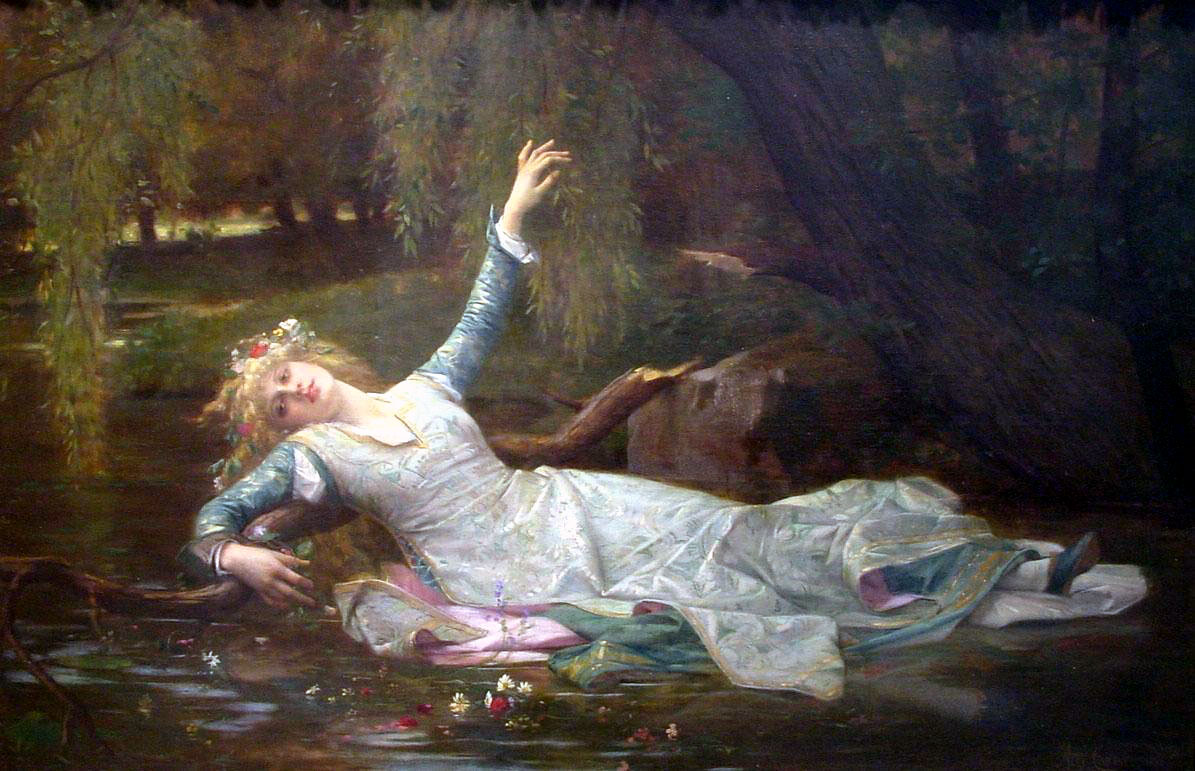
Ophelia by Alexandre Cabanel (1883)

In Act 4 Scene 7, Queen Gertrude reports that Ophelia had climbed into a willow tree (There is a willow grows aslant the brook), and that the branch had broken and dropped Ophelia into the brook, where she drowned. Gertrude says that Ophelia appeared "incapable of her own distress". Gertrude's announcement of Ophelia's death has been praised as one of the most poetic death announcements in literature.

Later, a sexton at the graveyard insists Ophelia must have killed herself. Laertes is outraged by what the cleric says, and replies that Ophelia will be an angel in heaven when the cleric "lie[s] howling" in hell.

At Ophelia's funeral, Queen Gertrude sprinkles flowers on Ophelia's grave ("Sweets to the sweet"), and says she wished Ophelia could have been Hamlet's wife (contradicting Laertes' warnings to Ophelia in the first act). Laertes then jumps into the grave dug for Ophelia, asking for the burial to wait until he has held her in his arms one last time and proclaims how much he loved her. Hamlet, nearby, then challenges Laertes and claims that he loved Ophelia more than "forty thousand" brothers could. Claudius promises to have a monument constructed in her memory. Ophelia is not mentioned further after this scene.

== Portrayal ==
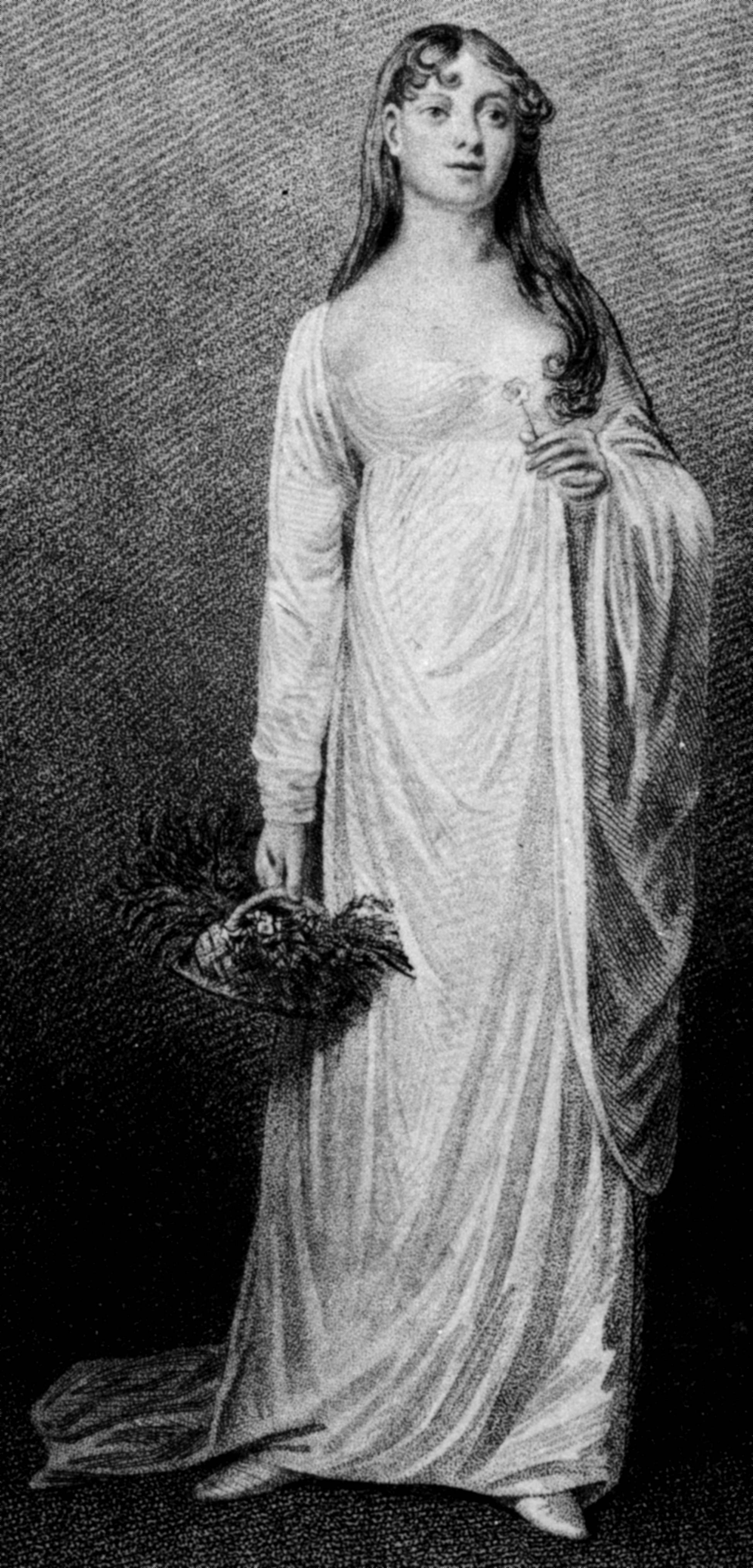
Mary Catherine Bolton (later Lady Thurlow) (1790–1830) as Ophelia in 1813, opposite John Philip Kemble's Hamlet

=== In Hamlet ===
While it is known that Richard Burbage played Hamlet in Shakespeare's time, there is no evidence of who played Ophelia; since there were no professional actresses on the public stage in Elizabethan England, it can be assumed that she was played by a boy. The actor appears to have had some musical training, as Ophelia is given lines from ballads such as "Walsingham" to sing, and, according to the first quarto edition, enters Act IV Scene 5 with a lute, singing.

The early modern stage in England had an established set of emblematic conventions for the representation of female madness: dishevelled hair worn down, dressed in white, bedecked with wild flowers, Ophelia's state of mind would have been immediately 'readable' to her first audiences. In Shakespeare's King John (1595/6), the action of act three, scene four turns on the semiotic values of hair worn up or down and dishevelled: Constance enters "distracted, with her hair about her ears" (17); "Lady, you utter madness, and not sorrow", Pandolf rebukes her (43), yet she insists that "I am not mad; this hair I tear is mine" (45); she is repeatedly bid to "bind up your hairs"; she obeys, then subsequently unbinds it again, insisting "I will not keep this form upon my head / When there is such disorder in my wit" (101–102) "Colour was a major source of stage symbolism", Andrew Gurr says, so the contrast between Hamlet's "nighted colour" (1.2.68) and "customary suits of solemn black" (1.2.78) and Ophelia's "virginal and vacant white" would have conveyed specific and gendered associations. Her action of offering wild flowers to the court suggests, Showalter argues, a symbolic deflowering, while even the manner of her 'doubtful death', by drowning, carries associations with the feminine (Laertes refers to his tears on hearing the news as "the woman").

Gender-structured, too, was the early modern understanding of the distinction between Hamlet's madness and Ophelia's: melancholy was understood as a male disease of the intellect, while Ophelia would have been understood as suffering from erotomania, a malady conceived in biological and emotional terms. This discourse of female madness influenced Ophelia's representation on stage from the 1660s, when the appearance of actresses in the English theatres first began to introduce "new meanings and subversive tensions" into the role: "the most celebrated of the actresses who played Ophelia were those whom rumor credited with disappointments in love". Showalter relates a theatrical anecdote that vividly captures this sense of overlap between a performer's identity and the role she plays:

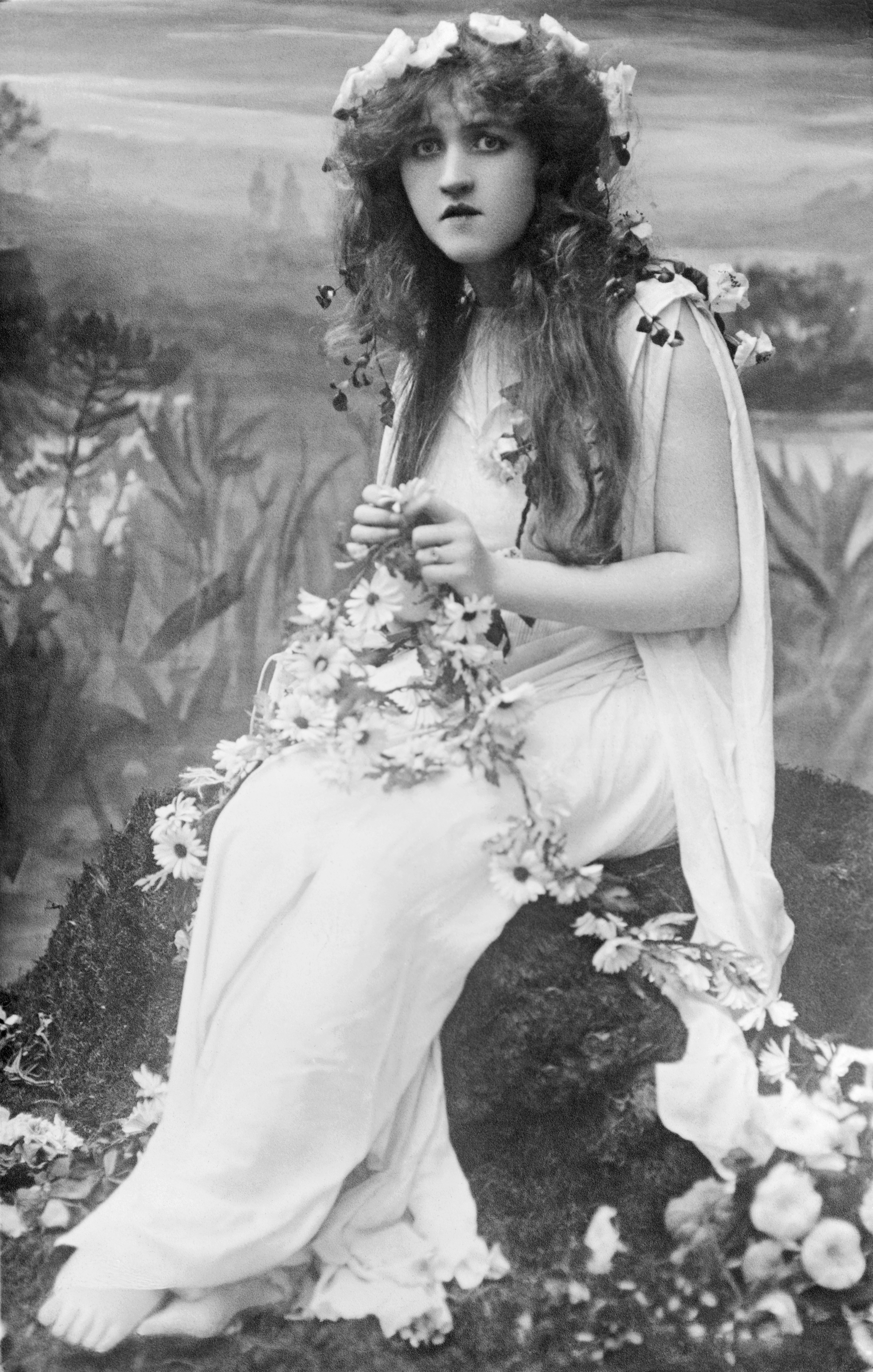
Soprano Mignon Nevada as Ophelia in the opera Hamlet, c. 1910. The operatic version simplifies the plot to focus the drama on Hamlet's predicament and its effects on Ophelia.

The greatest triumph was reserved for Susan Mountfort, a former actress at Lincoln's Inn Fields who had gone mad after her lover's betrayal. One night in 1720 she escaped from her keeper, rushed to the theater, and just as the Ophelia of the evening was to enter for her mad scene, "sprang forward in her place ... with wild eyes and wavering motion." As a contemporary reported, "she was in truth Ophelia herself, to the amazement of the performers as well as of the audience—nature having made this last effort, her vital powers failed her and she died soon after.

During the 18th century, the conventions of Augustan drama encouraged far less intense, more sentimentalised and decorous depictions of Ophelia's madness and sexuality. From Mrs Lessingham in 1772 to Mary Catherine Bolton, playing opposite John Kemble in 1813, the familiar iconography of the role replaced its passionate embodiment. Sarah Siddons played Ophelia's madness with "stately and classical dignity" in 1785.

In the 19th century, she was portrayed by Helen Faucit, Dora Jordan, Frances Abington and Peg Woffington, who won her first real fame by playing the role. Theatre manager Tate Wilkinson declared that next to Susannah Maria Cibber, Elizabeth Satchell (of the famous Kemble family) was the best Ophelia he ever saw.

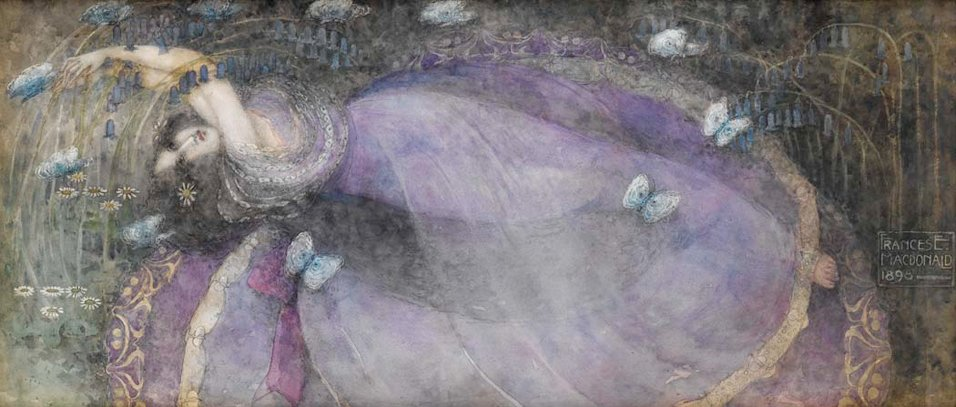
Frances MacDonald – Ophelia 1898

=== In film ===
Ophelia has been portrayed on screen since the days of early silent films. Dorothy Foster played her opposite Charles Raymond's Hamlet in the 1912 film Hamlet. Jean Simmons played Ophelia to Laurence Olivier's Oscar-winning Hamlet performance in 1948 and was nominated for the Academy Award for Best Supporting Actress. More recently, Ophelia has been portrayed by Anastasiya Vertinskaya (1964), Marianne Faithfull (1969), Helena Bonham Carter (1990), Kate Winslet (1996), Julia Stiles (2000), Zhou Xun (2006), Mariah Gale (2009), Daisy Ridley (2018), Jessica Brown Findlay (2018), and Morfydd Clark (2025). Themes associated with Ophelia have led to movies such as Ophelia Learns to Swim (2000) and Dying Like Ophelia (2002). In Vishal Bhardwaj's adaptation Haider (2014), the character was portrayed by actress Shraddha Kapoor. In Claire McCarthy's Ophelia (2018), starring Ridley, the Hamlet story is told from Ophelia's perspective.

In many modern theatre and film adaptations, Ophelia is portrayed barefoot in the mad scenes, including Kozintsev's 1964 film, Zeffirelli's 1990 film, Kenneth Branagh's 1996 film, and Michael Almereyda's Hamlet 2000 (2000) versions.

=== In paint ===
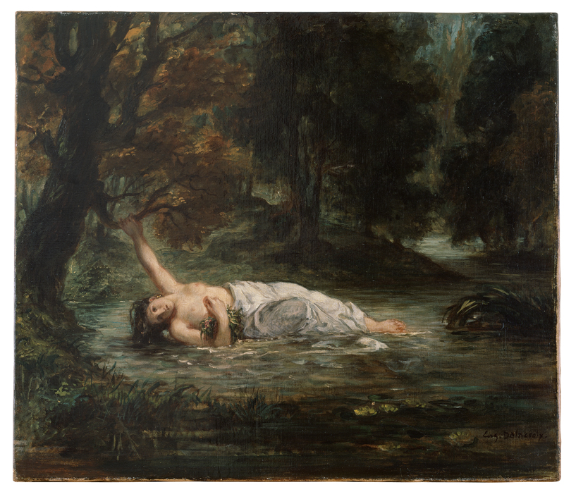
Eugène Delacroix, The Death of Ophelia (1838)

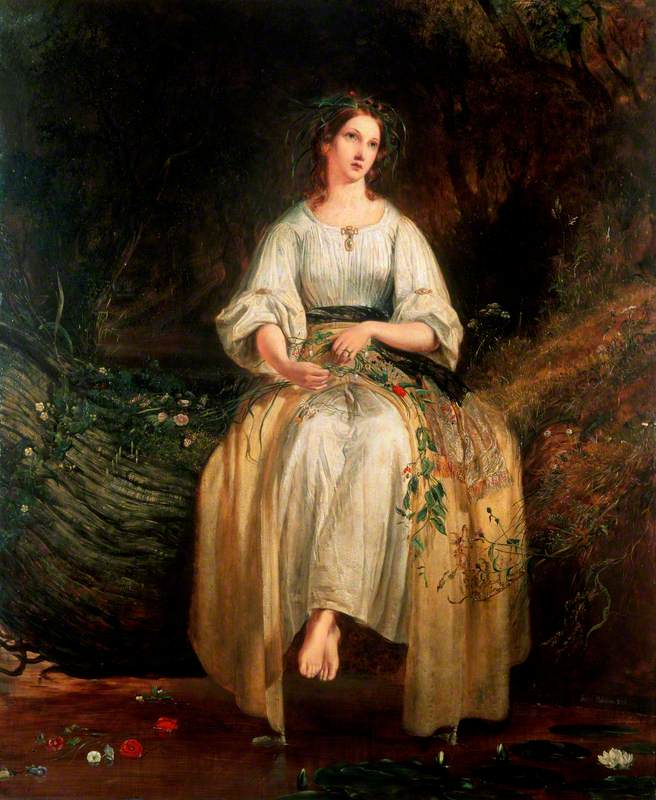
Richard Redgrave, Ophelia Weaving Her Garlands (1842)

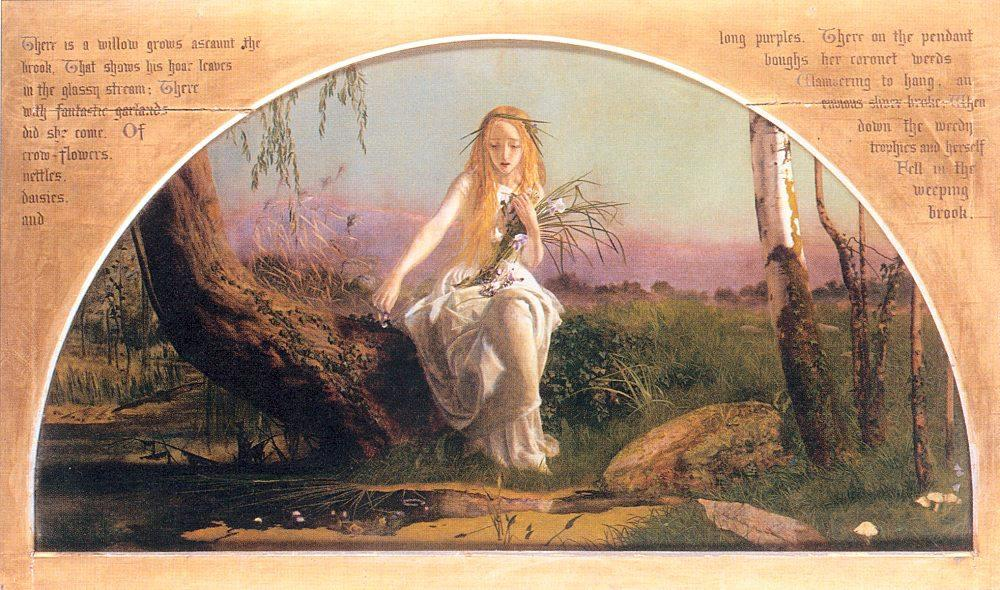
Arthur Hughes, Ophelia (1852)

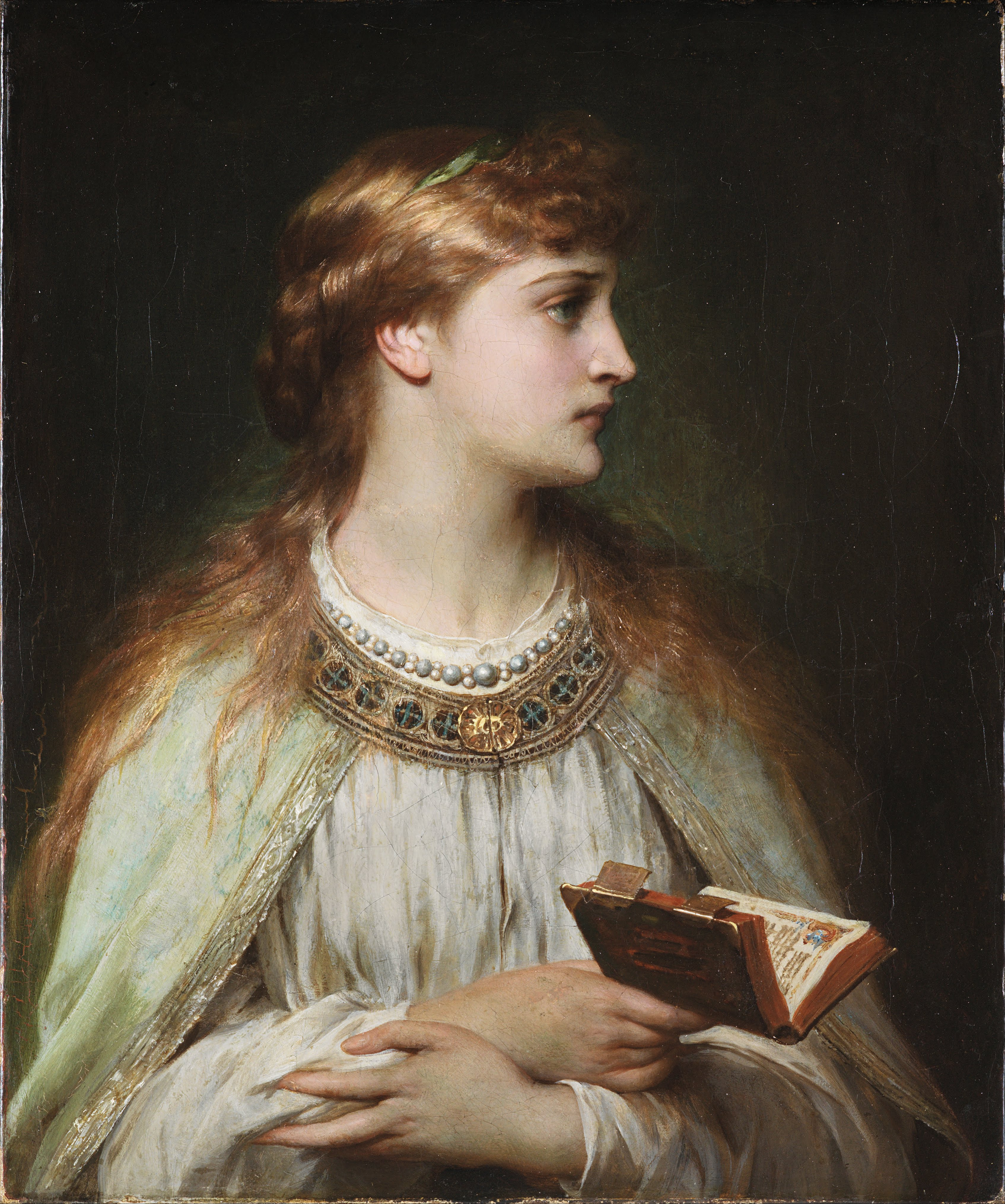
Thomas Francis Dicksee, Ophelia (c. 1864)

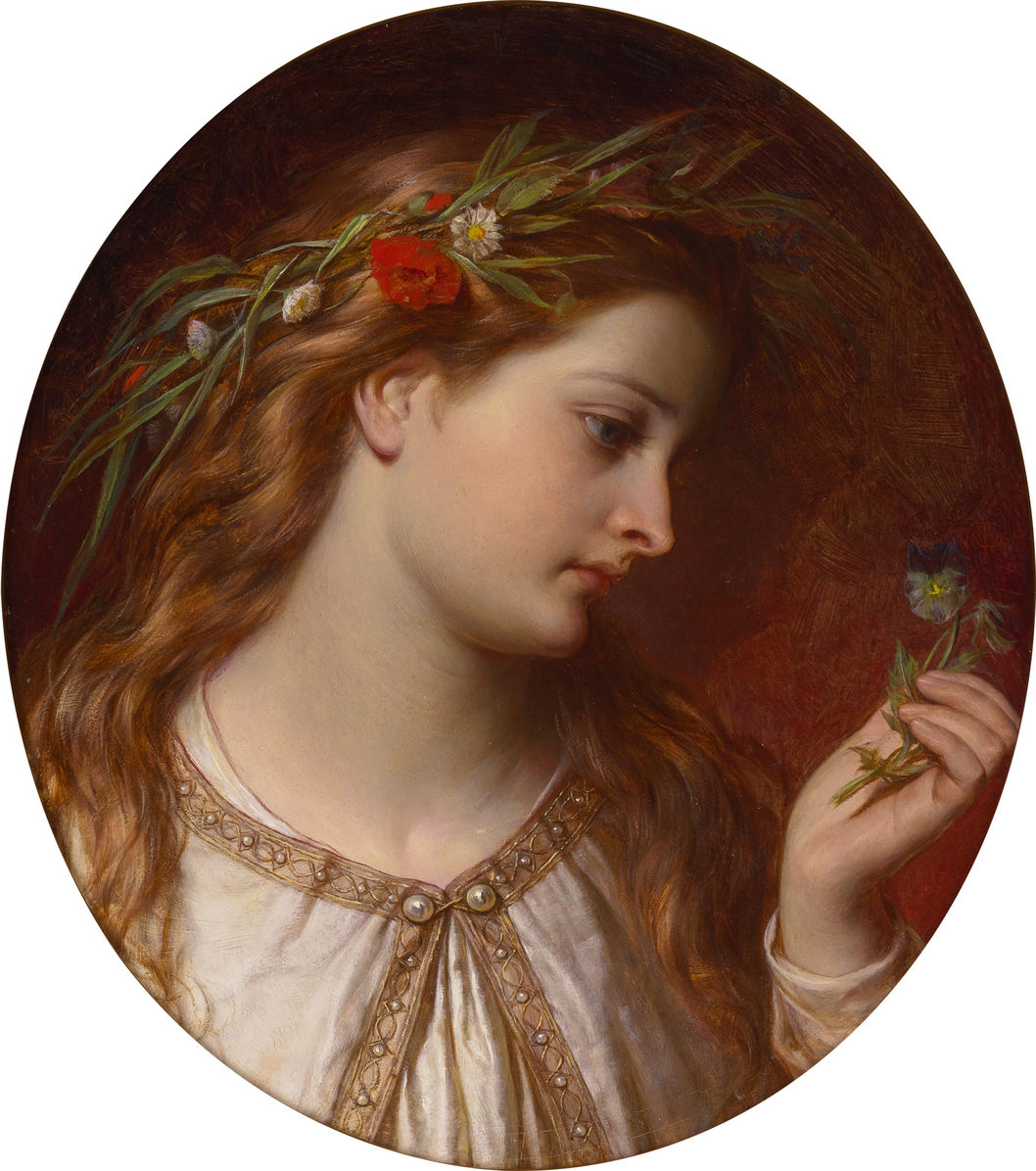
Thomas Francis Dicksee, Ophelia (1865)

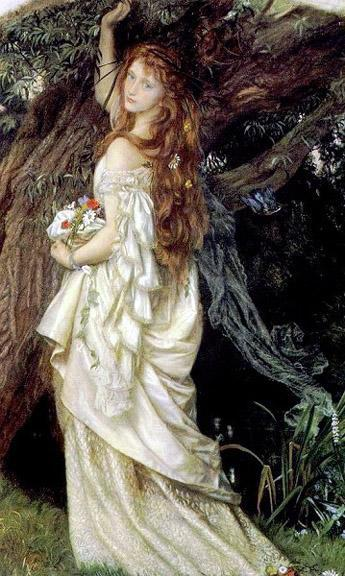
Arthur Hughes, Ophelia (c. 1865)

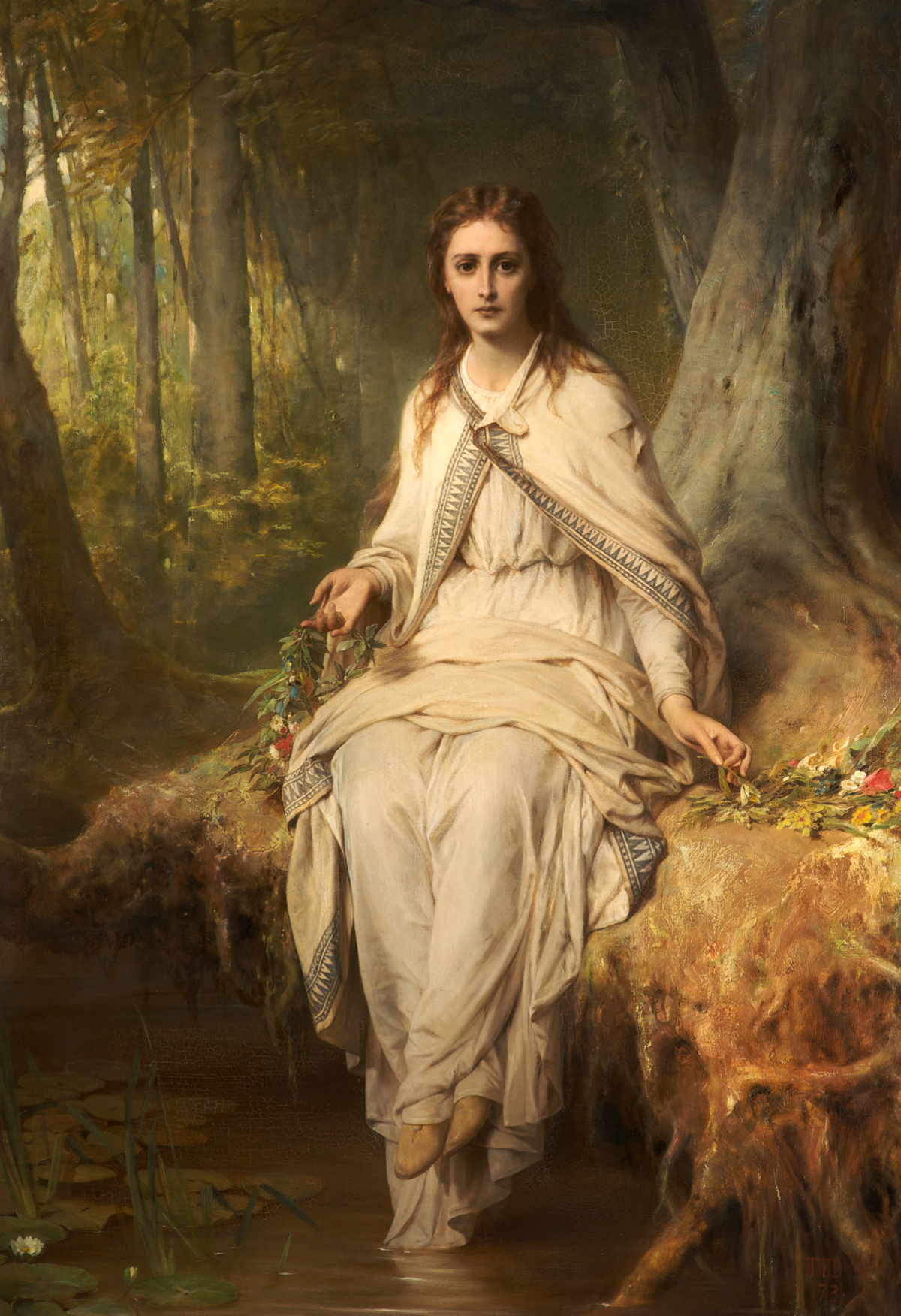
Thomas Francis Dicksee, Ophelia (1873)

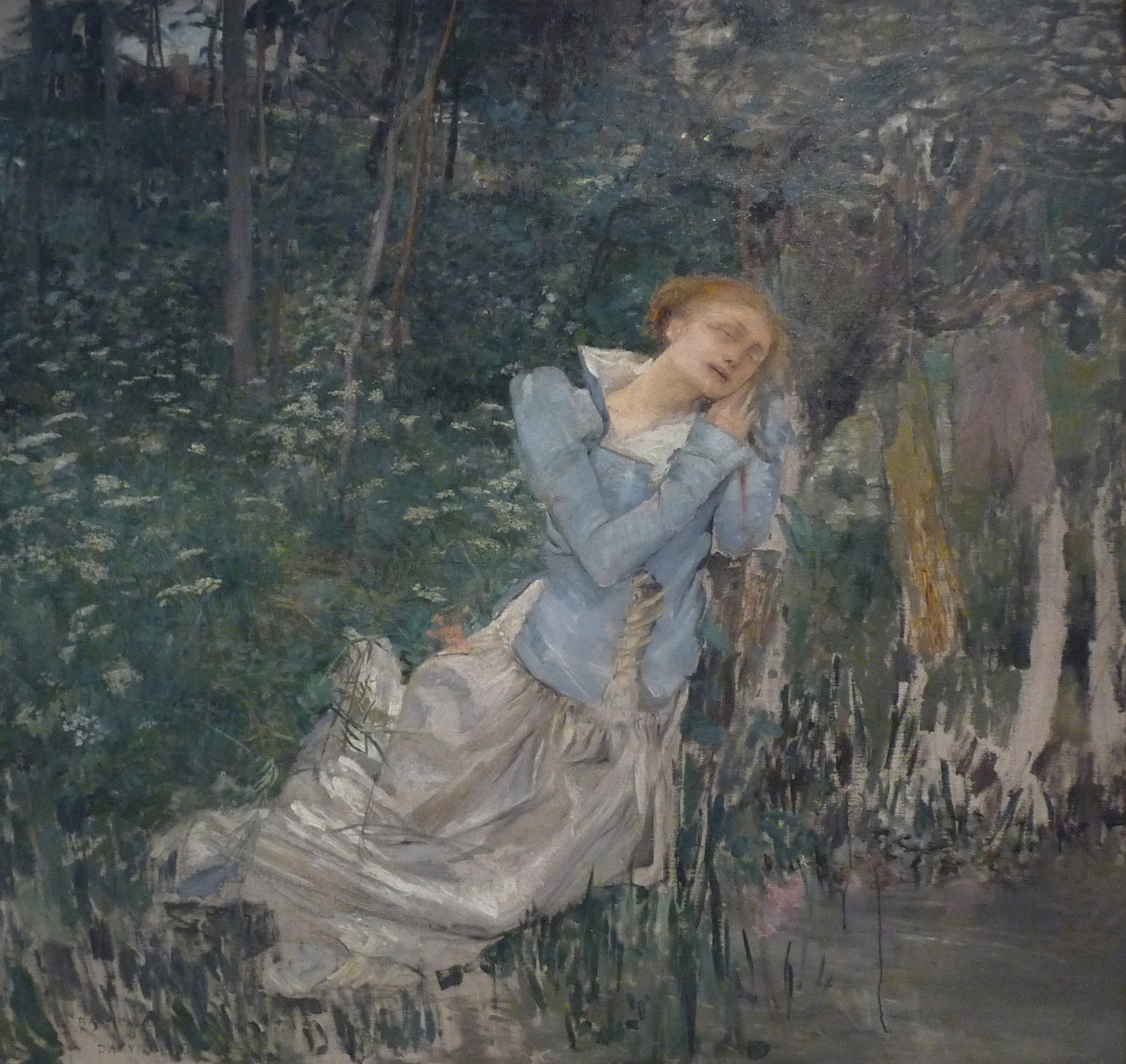
Jules Bastien Lepage, Ophelia (1881)

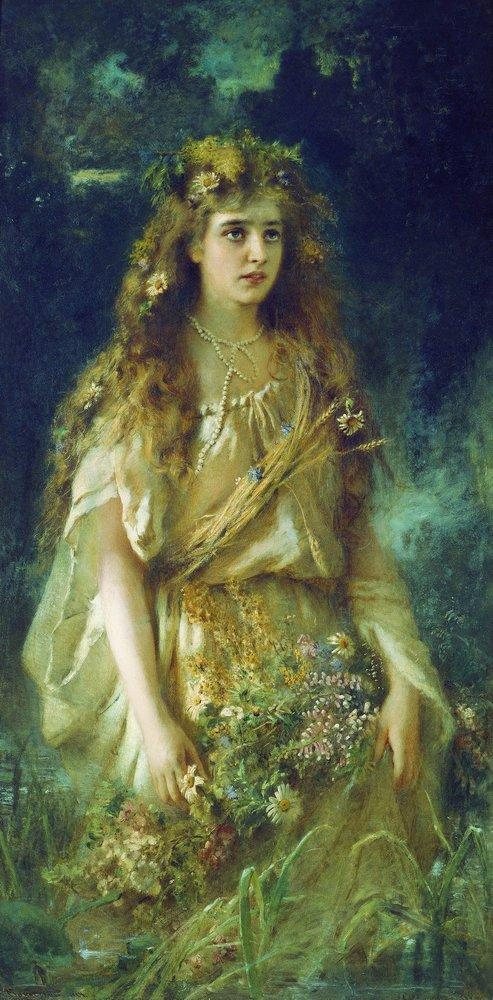
Konstantin Makovsky, Ophelia (1884)

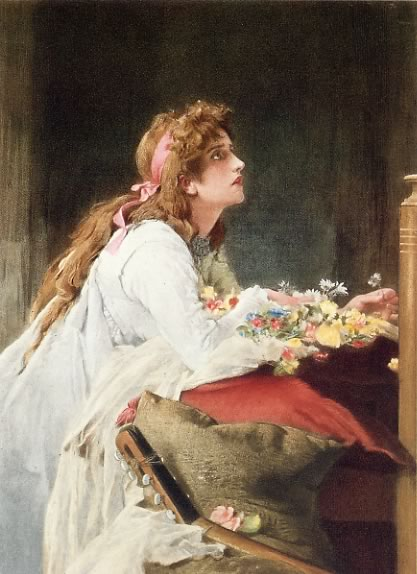
Ophelia, Marcus Stone (1888)

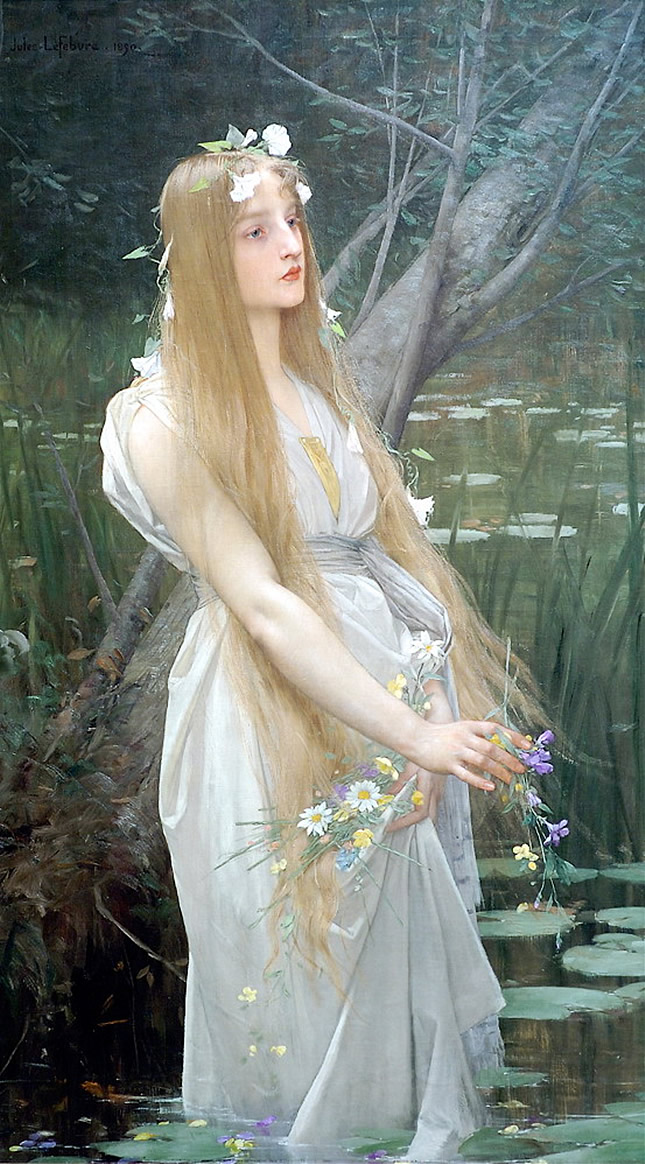
Jules Joseph Lefebvre, Ophelia (1890)

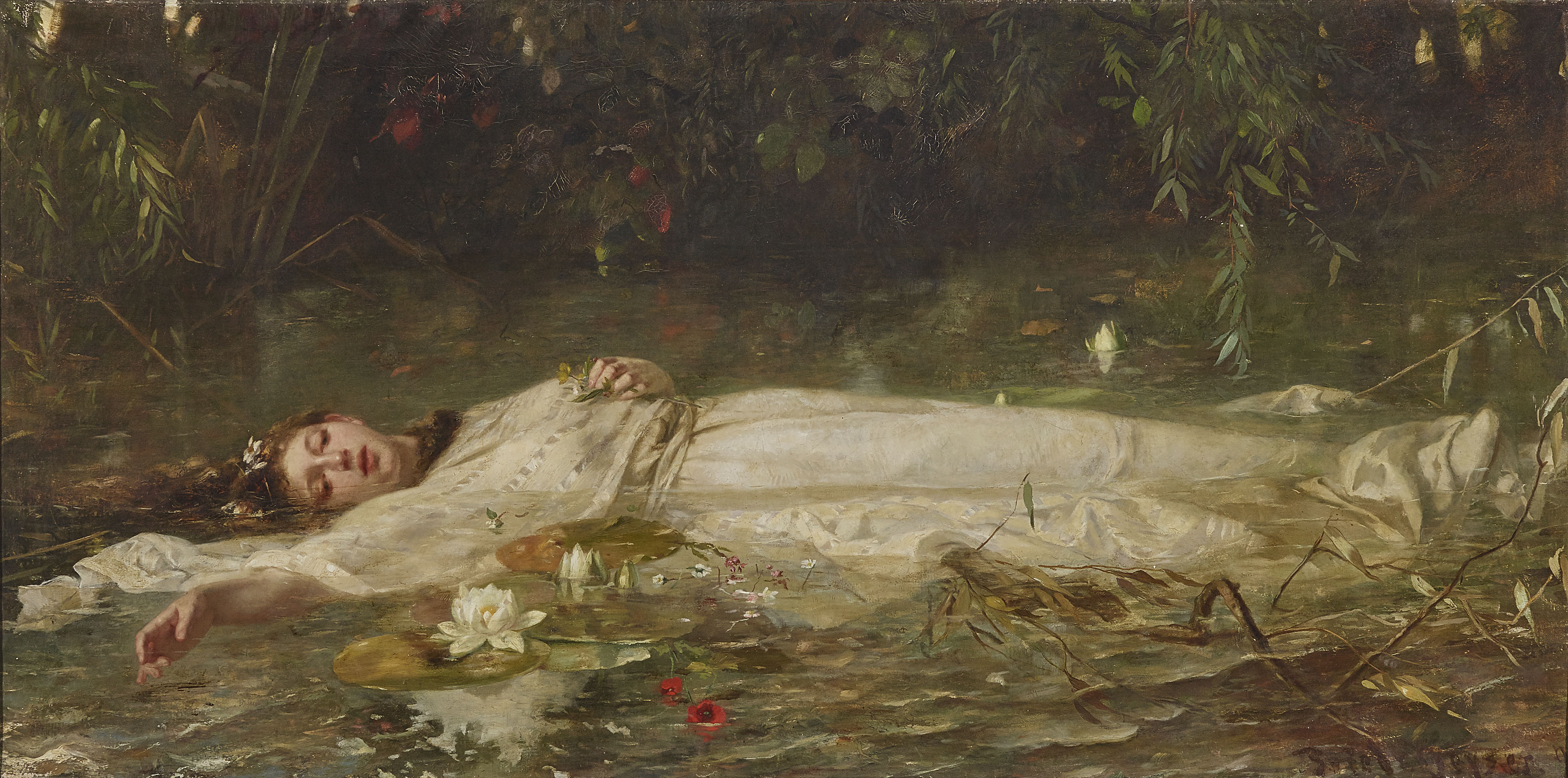
Friedrich Wilhelm Theodor Heyser, Ophelia (1900)

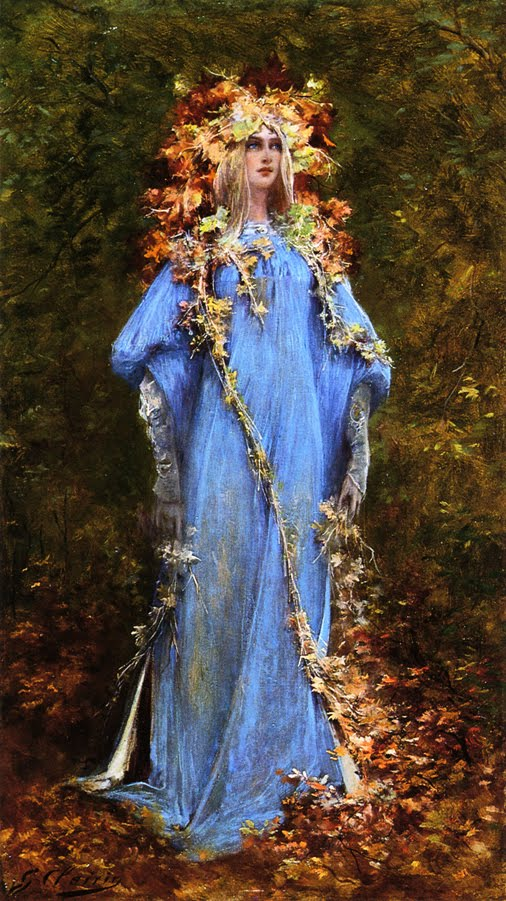
Georges Clairin, Ophelia

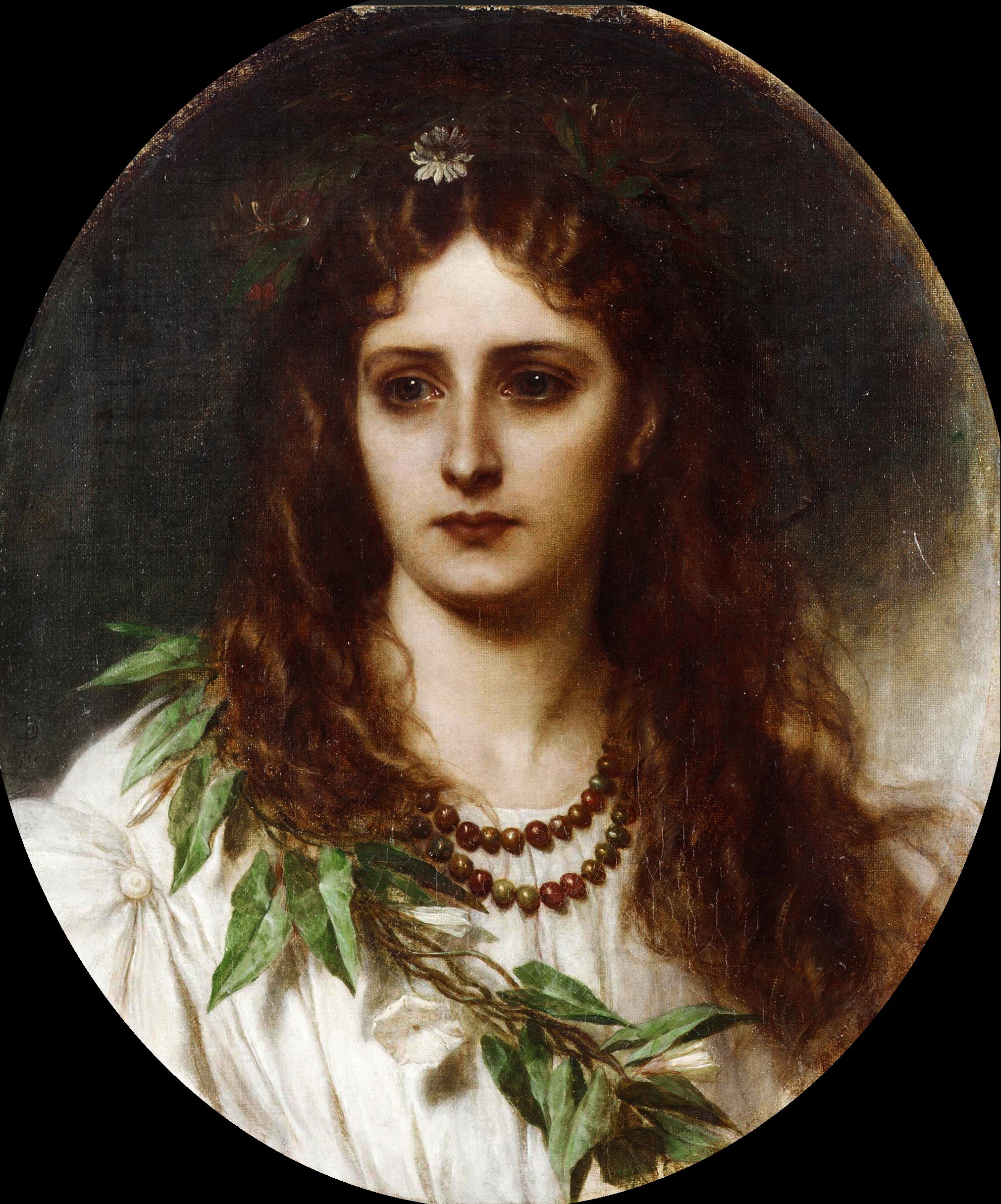
Thomas Francis Dicksee, Ophelia (1870)

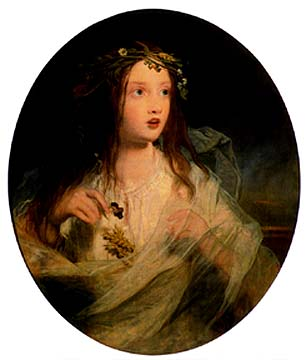
James Sant, Ophelia

== Cultural references ==
Ophelia often appears in various cultural contexts, including literature, music, film and television. A moon of Uranus is named after Ophelia. Robert Schumann in 'Herzeleid' from 'Sechs Gesänge' (opus 107 nr 1; 1852) puts the poem of Titus Ullrich to music, which is dedicated to the figure of Ophelia, ending with her name sung twice. A foreboding image of Kirsten Dunst in the opening of Melancholia (2011) suggests Ophelia. Gregory Crewdson's untitled picture from 2001 whose unofficial reference title is Ophelia, is a still photograph that was created with a life size set of a living room flooded with water built on a sound stage and lit with a cinematic lighting team.

American singer-songwriter Bob Dylan includes Ophelia as one of the characters residing on Desolation Row in the song of the same title from the album Highway 61 Revisited, recorded in 1965.

American rock music band Grateful Dead mentions Ophelia in their song "Althea" from the album Go to Heaven. The lyric, "You may meet the fate of Ophelia, sleeping and perchance to dream," references "To die, to sleep— / To sleep—perchance to dream." in Hamlet's soliloquy (Hamlet 3.1.64-65).

French singer-songwriter Nolwenn Leroy was inspired by this character for her song "Ophélia", released on her 2012 album Ô Filles de l'eau.

American alternative folk band The Lumineers released the single "Ophelia" on 5 February 2016, which according to lead vocalist Wesley Shultz is a reference to Hamlet as well as the consequences of fame.

British singer-producer PinkPantheress released her debut album Heaven Knows on 10 November 2023. The album's tenth track, "Ophelia", was co-produced with British producer-composer Danny L Harle and heavily referenced Ophelia's death in Hamlet.

The first single from American singer-songwriter Taylor Swift's 12th studio album The Life of a Showgirl (2025), titled "The Fate of Ophelia", references Ophelia's death by drowning.
