= Ophelia (Cabanel) =

Painting by Alexandre Cabanel

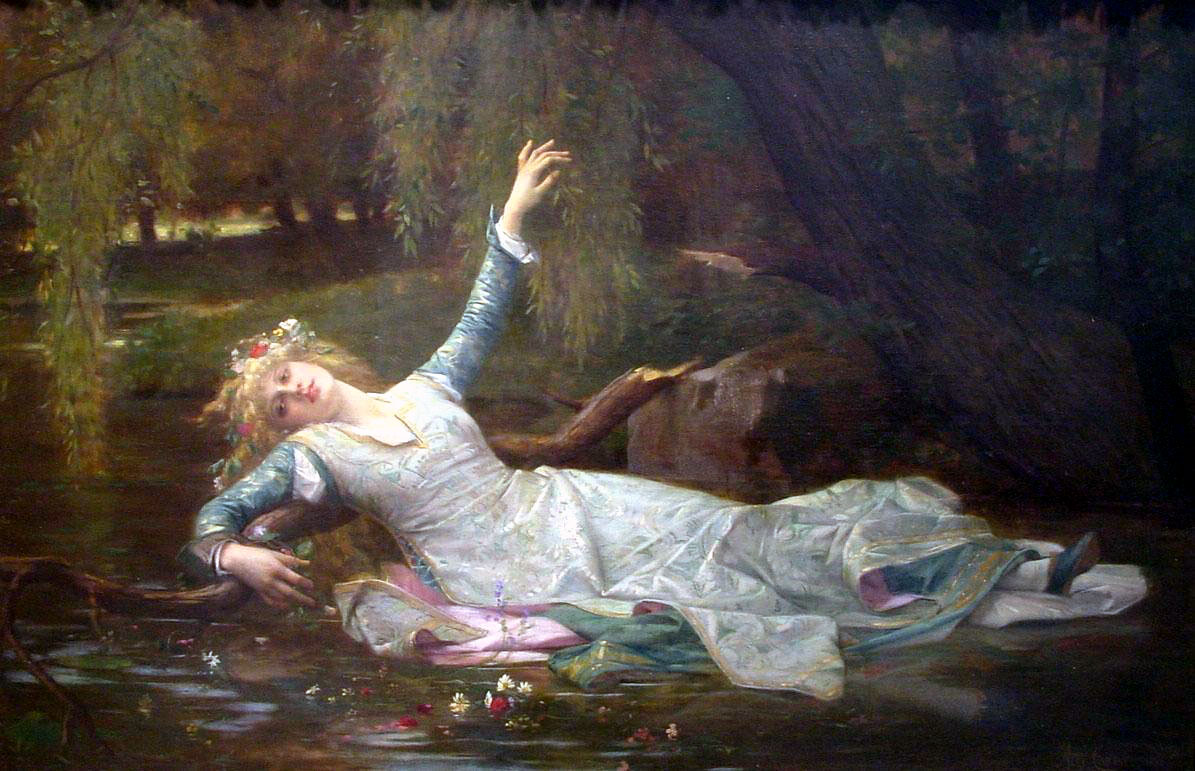
- Artist: Alexandre Cabanel
- Year: 1883
- Medium: Oil on canvas
- Dimensions: 77 cm × 117.5 cm (30 in × 46.3 in)
- Location: Private collection

Ophelia is an oil on canvas painting by French painter Alexandre Cabanel, from 1883. It is held in a private collection.

== Description ==
The painting depicts a scene taken from the play Hamlet, by William Shakespeare, when the female protagonist, Ophelia, driven by insanity, is about to commit suicide in a lake. This scene was often depicted by the romantic painters of the 19th century. In the painting, Ophelia is shown lying down, with her head thrown back, eyes weary, and her right hand and back slumped on a broken branch, while her left hand is clutching a branch of a weeping willow. Ophelia wears a sky blue dress that seems so light that appears to float in the water..

Flowers, including daisies and primroses, lie on the still water of the lake, the same ones that make the crown of flowers that Ophelia wears in her blonde hair. This floral reference also appears in the previous painting of John Everett Millais, also titled Ophelia, which seems to have inspired it. The fair skin of the girl stands out in contrast with the darkness of the forest and the marsh. She seems almost to be illuminating her surroundings with her own light, which will soon fade away with her death.
