= Hans Hartmann-McLean =

German sculptor

Hans Hartmann-McLean (born Hans Rudolf Hartmann; 20 May 1862 in Dresden – 28 December 1946 in Dresden) was a German sculptor. He studied from 1879 to 1885 at the Dresden Academy of Fine Arts, where his tutors included Johannes Schilling.
