= Ambush Bay (Antarctica) =

Bay in Antarctica

Coordinates: 63°10′S 55°26′W

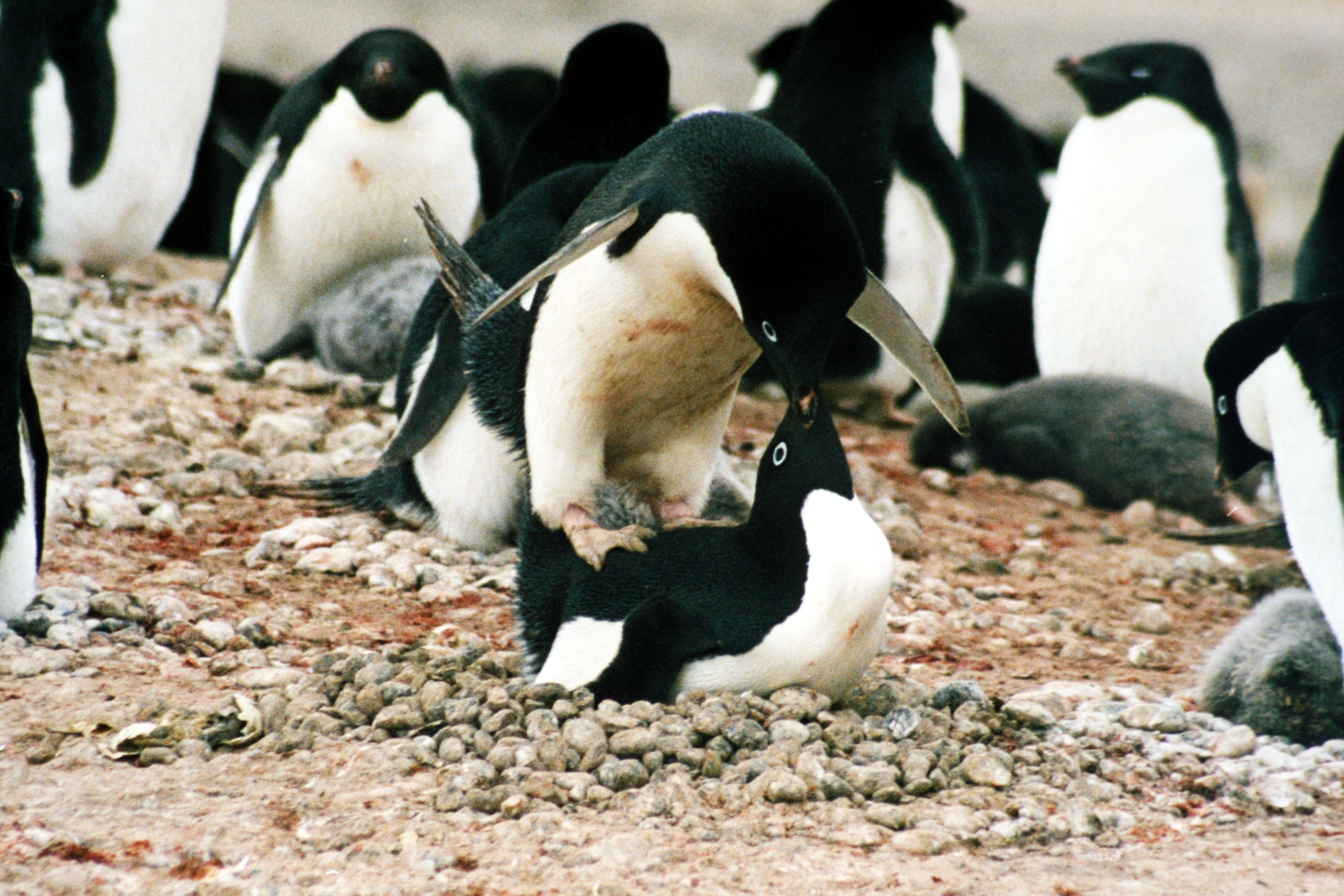
Mating Adélie penguins

Ambush Bay is a bay 6 km (3.2 nmi) wide indenting the north coast of Joinville Island immediately east of King Point. Ofelia Island lies in the southwest part of the bay. The feature was surveyed by the Falkland Islands Dependencies Survey (nIDS) in 1953. The name arose because the bay is a trap for the unwary if its shallow and foul nature is not known.

== Important Bird Area ==
A 69 ha site comprising the ice-free ground on the eastern side of the bay has been identified as an Important Bird Area by BirdLife International because of the concentrations of seabirds there, in particular a breeding colony of about 18,000 pairs of Adélie penguins (as estimated from December 2011 satellite imagery).
