= Friedrich Heyser =

German painter

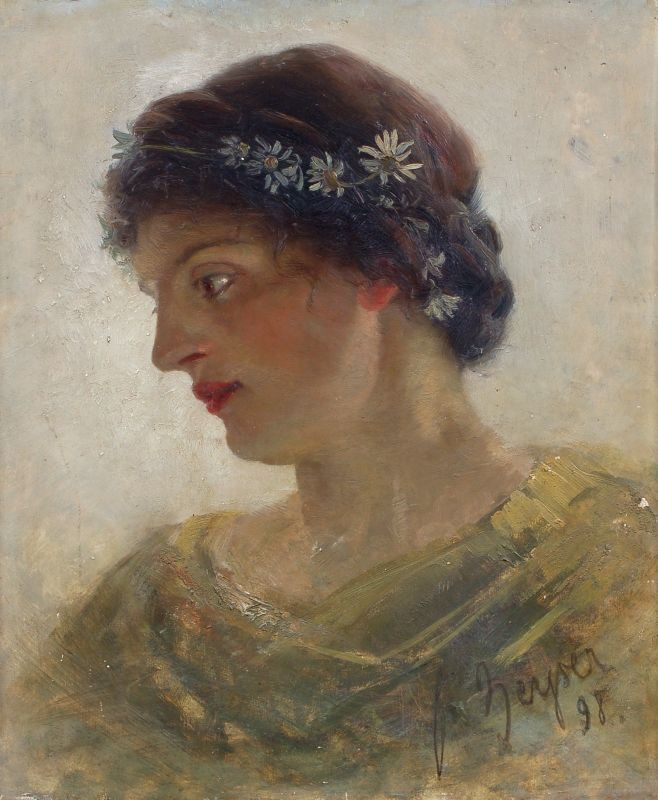
Portrait of a Lady with a Wreath of Flowers, 1898

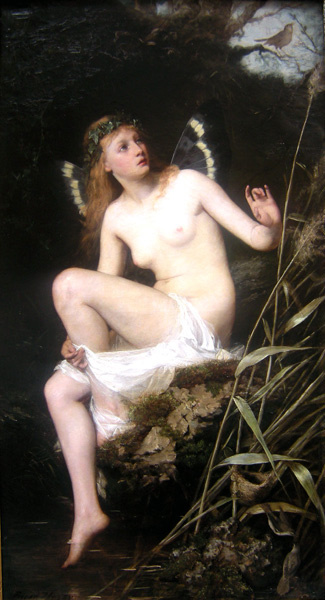
Nymphe

Friedrich Wilhelm Theodor Heyser (September 12, 1857 in Gnoien – September 7, 1921 in Dresden) was a German portrait, landscape, and history painter.

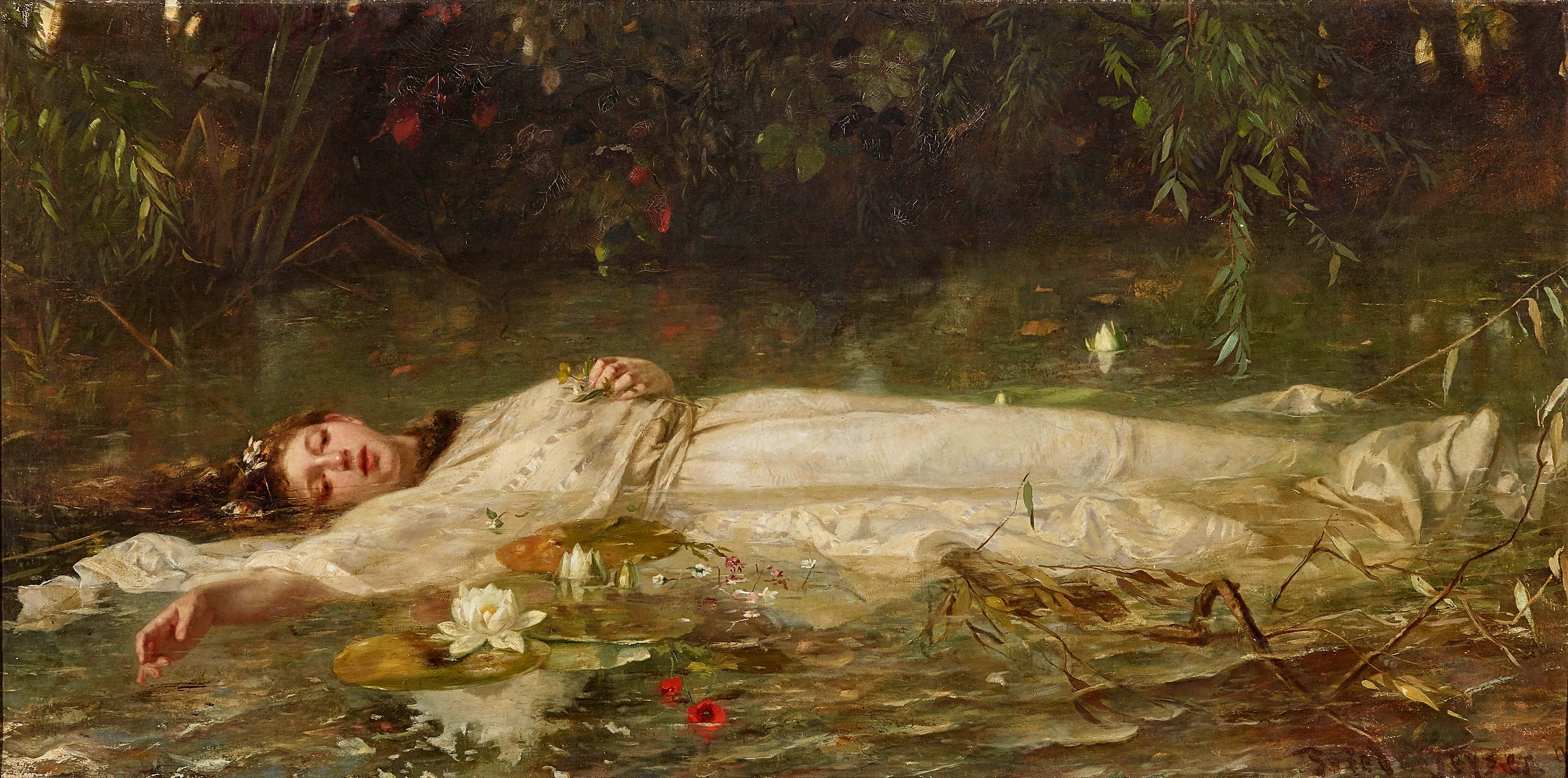
Ophelia, c.1900

== Life ==
Friedrich Heyser studied from 1880 to 1883 at the Academy of Fine Arts in Dresden as a student of Leon Pohle and Paul Mohn. From 1883 to 1885, he studied with Ferdinand Keller at the Academy of Fine Arts in Karlsruhe. In 1890 he briefly attended the Académie Julian in Paris. He lived and worked in Berlin, Bad Harzburg, and Dresden.

Heyser was a member of the Allgemeine Deutsche Kunstgenossenschaft and the artist group Grün-Weiss (green and white are the state colors of Saxony) formed around 1910. Members of the Grün-Weiß group included painters Max Frey, Josef Goller, Georg Jahn, Walther Illner, Georg Lührig, Max Pietschmann, Paul von Schlippenbach, Bernhard Schröter, Johann Walter-Kurau, sculptors Richard Guhr, Hans Hartmann-McLean, Heinrich Wedemeyer, and architects Rudolf Bitzan, Georg Heinsius von Mayenburg, and Martin Pietzsch. The Grün-Weiß group, a progressive group within the Dresden Art Cooperative, presented their works in the Emil Richter Art Salon starting October 29, 1910. From today's perspective, the Grün-Weiß was a moderate attempt to bring movement into the conservative structures of the Dresden Art Cooperative.

== Works ==
Friedrich Heyser created numerous portraits of well-known personalities as well as genre-like depictions, often based on German poetry. In the last years of his life he created some landscape paintings from the island of Föhr and Friesland.

In 2025, Heyser's painting Ophelia was referenced in Taylor Swift's music video for her song, "The Fate of Ophelia". The incident brought attention to the artist and drew fans to see painting in the Museum Wiesbaden.

Portraits

- 1886: Gustav zu Putlitz
- Friedrich von Bodenstedt
- 1888: Joseph Joachim
- 1890: Hermann Wislicenus
- 1895 (circa): Julius Stinde
- 1898 (circa): Georg Schumann
- 1906 (circa): Claire von Glümer
- 1906: Prince Albert of Prussia
- 1909: Richard_Schleinitz
- 1910 (circa): Armbruster (sculptor)
- Adolf Fischer-Gurig
- Prince and Princess Johann Georg of Saxony

Genre-like depictions

- 1886: The Fisherman (after Goethe)
- 1887: Der Blumen Rache (after Freiligrath)
- 1891: The Peri at Heaven's Gate
- Gloria in Excelsis
- 1900 (circa): Ophelia

== Awards ==
- Prize of the Academic Senate for the execution of two murals in the meeting room of the Gewandhaus in Bautzen (ex aequo Georg Schwenk).
- 1901: Small golden plaquette, International Art Exhibition Dresden 1901.

== Literature ==
- Ernst Sigismund : . In: Hans Vollmer (ed.): Founded by Ulrich Thieme and Felix Becker . tape 17 : Heubel–Hubard . EA Seemann, Leipzig 1924, p. 41 .
- Heyser, Friedrich. In: Friedrich Jansa: German artists in words and pictures. Verlag Friedrich Jansa, Leipzig 1912, p. 264 with ill.
- Hermann Alexander Müller, Hans Wolfgang Singer : . In: . 3rd Edition. 2nd volume, 1st half. Rütten & Luenning, Frankfurt am Main 1896, p. 176 ( Text Archive - Internet Archive ).
- Heyser, Friedrich. In: Friedrich von Boetticher: Painting works of the 19th century. contribution to art history. Volume 1/2, sheet 31-61: Heideck-Mayer, Louis. Mrs. v. Boetticher's Verlag, Dresden 1895, p. 530 ( text archive - Internet Archive ).
