= The Death of Ophelia (Delacroix) =

Painting by Eugène Delacroix

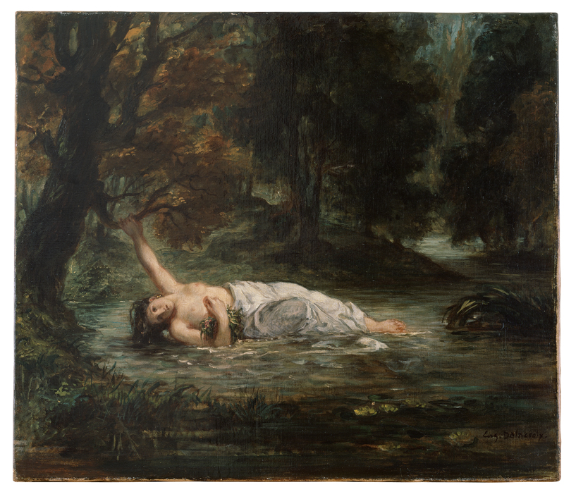
- Reinhart Collection version (1844)
- Artist: Eugène Delacroix
- Year: 1838
- Type: Oil on canvas, history painting
- Dimensions: 37.9 cm × 45.9 cm (14.9 in × 18.1 in)
- Location: Neue Pinakothek, Munich

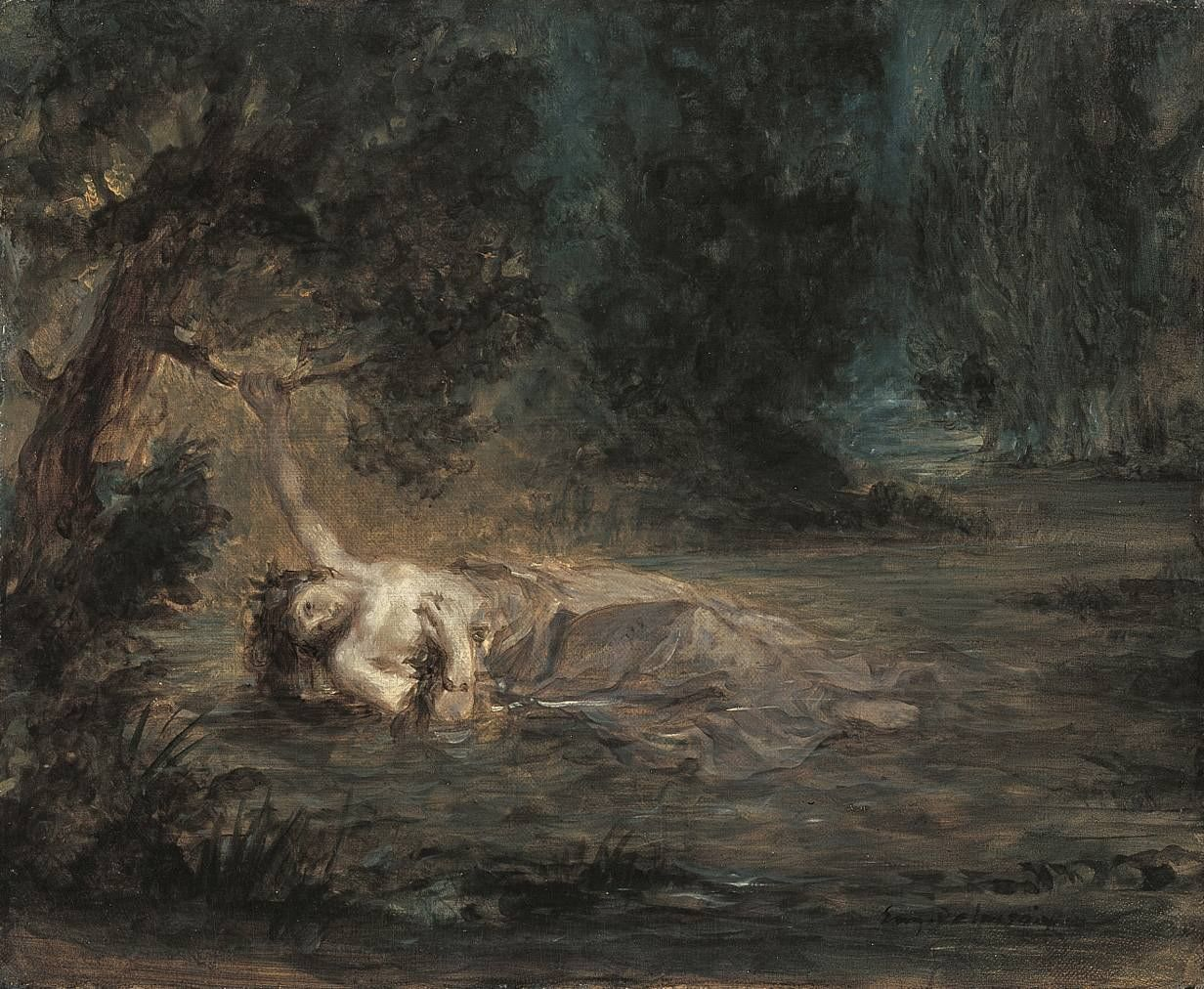
Neue Pinakothek version (1838).

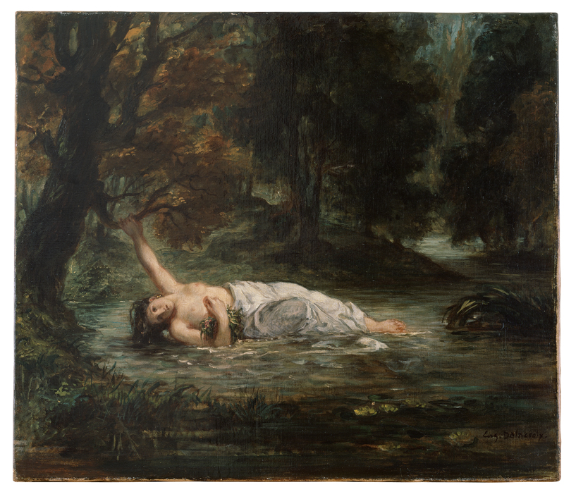
Reinhart Collection version (1844).

The Death of Ophelia (French: La mort d'Ophélie) is an 1838 oil painting by the French artist Eugène Delacroix.

== Background ==
The painting portrays a scene from William Shakespeare's play Hamlet. Ophelia is shown following her descent into madness and drowning.

Delacroix and other French romantics were inspired by the work of British authors such as Shakespeare, Lord Byron and Walter Scott. Delacroix produced three different versions of the work with variations.

== Versions ==
The 1838 original is now in the Neue Pinakothek in Munich

The slightly larger 1844 version is in the Reinhart Collection in Switzerland.

== Bibliography ==
- Allard, Sébastien & Fabre, Côme. Delacroix. Metropolitan Museum of Art, 2018.
- Alston, Isabella. Delacroix. TAJ Books International, 2014.
- Hilbornz Matthew. Ophelia Through Time: Reimagings in Art and Film. Cambridge Scholars Publishing, 2025.
- Larson, Dixie Lee. The Motif of the Drowned Woman in Nineteenth-century Literature and Art. University of New Mexico, 1998.
