= Kyra Vayne =

Kyra Knopmuss, known professionally as Kyra Vayne (29 January 1916 in St Petersburg, Russia – 12 January 2001 in London; Cyrillic form Кира Кнопмусс) was a Russian-born British opera singer.

== Biography ==
The Russian-born soprano Kyra Vayne came to London in 1924. From the late 1930s to the late 1950s she sang in London and elsewhere in revue and variety, and later in opera. Reviewers acknowledged that she had a fine voice but for various reasons her career was only intermittently successful. In A Voice Reborn she tried to explain the reasons for this: sometimes "personal problems intruded on, and destroyed my professional life – or rather, I stupidly allowed them to", and opportunities, were missed especially in Italy. "Wherever I went I was the perpetual outsider."

She was born Kyra Knopmuss in St Petersburg just before the Revolution, and in 1924 the family fled to London. She was educated at a private school, leaving at 15. In 1937 she became a showgirl in the revue "Sanctions", featuring Phyllis Dixey. She first broadcast for the BBC in 1938 with Teddy Joyce's Girls' Choir. After two voice teachers whom she did not like, she found Mignon Nevada, which was satisfactory.

Between 1937 and 1941, she, at first under the name of Kyra Vronska, toured in such musicals as Balalaika, Show Boat and Chu Chin Chow. Then she sang Russian gypsy songs in Vic Oliver's show "Variety Bill" on tour in Britain. She changed her name again to Kyra Vayne and sang with Oliver's British Symphony Orchestra. She then sang in Mussorgsky's Sorochintsi Fair at the Savoy Theatre and on tour, alternating with Oda Slobodskaya in the role of Khivria, and also with Daria Bayan as Parassia. This production was very popular and returned to London at the Adelphi Theatre before going on a second tour. She also sang the title role of Gay Rosalinda, an English version of Johann Strauss's Die Fledermaus, at the Palace Theatre, for four weeks in 1945, but was replaced by another soprano who invested in the show.

After the war Vayne toured Scandinavia, singing at China Variety Theatre in Stockholm, the Tivoli Gardens in Copenhagen and elsewhere. In 1947, she appeared as the singer in the filmThe White Unicorn.

In 1949 she was invited to sing Fevronia in The Legend of the Invisible City of Kitezh by Rimsky-Korsakov at the Liceu in Barcelona. In 1951 she sang Leonora in Il trovatore for Welsh National Opera, and in autumn 1952 Vayne sang her first Tosca, to the Scarpia of Tito Gobbi in the Italian Opera Company's production. The company returned in May 1953, when she sang Leonora in La forza del destino with Carlo Bergonzi as Don Alvaro. In 1952 she married Igor Semiletoff (the marriage was later dissolved). She had a long association with Eugene Iskoldoff, the impresario of the Italian Opera Company, who became her manager. She went to Italy to try her luck, and in 1954 sang Donna Anna in Dargomyzhky's The Stone Guest in Florence, and Tosca in Rome, Piacenza and Genoa, usually with success. She also sang Santuzza in Cavalleria rusticana with Gigli as Turiddu at Rome. During the last years of the Italian Opera Company, which ended in 1956, Vayne sang Violetta in La traviata, Leonora in Il trovatore and Tosca. She and Iskoldoff went to New York and then Hollywood to seek work but their money ran out and after Iskoldoff committed suicide Vayne was left destitute. She returned to London and became a secretary, and later a ceramic restorer.

In 1961 she went to New York with the Players' Theatre under the name of the Strollers. Eventually her first CD was issued, with arias from Prince Igor, The Queen of Spades and Tosca (Earl Okin "rediscovered" this soprano and Preiser released two CD sets made from her old, private records and broadcast tapes).

'Kyra had been working alongside my mother at the local bank for over 20 years when I first discovered that she had been an opera singer. Amazed at hearing the quality of her version of Ernani Involami on a private lacquer 78rpm record, I was determined to have her recordings published. The first success was on a CD associated with The Record Collector magazine but, later on Otto Preiser of Preiser Records, with help from some investment from some of Kyra's friends and fans, enabled the first full CD to be issued. Needless to say, people were amazed at the quality of her singing. Her comparative lack of career success was obviously due (when I heard her stories) to poor management. For instance, her manager had never even arranged a proper recording contract for her. Kyra was in fact one of the finest post-war operatic sopranos anywhere; far better, in my opinion, than Maria Callas, for instance. Her CDs sold well and she was memorably invited to Moscow for the passing of the millennium. I was delighted that she knew, by the time of her death, that she would be remembered' –

— Earl Okin

Later she recorded (at the age of 81) a disc of songs and operetta pieces, and wrote her autobiography, A Voice Reborn (1999).

She appeared on BBC Radio 4's Desert Island Discs on 24 March 1996, choosing a culinary book and peanuts and treats to tame animals and birds.

== Autobiography and discography ==
- 1999 A Voice Reborn. London: Arcadia Books ISBN 1-900850-27-3 (with Andrew Palmer)
- Kyra Vayne (Preiser 89996)
- Kyra Vayne, Volume 2 (Preiser 89993)
- Kyra Vayne (Eklipse EKR-P-16)
- Nostalgia with Kyra Vayne (Eklipse EKR-P-19)

== Sources ==
- Forbes, Elizabeth (15 January 2001). "Obituary Kyra Vayne". The Independent – via Questia.
