= HMS Ambush =

Three vessels of the Royal Navy have been named HMS Ambush.

- Ambush, or Ambush No. 5, was an American gunboat (Gunboat No. 5), launched in 1805, captured at the Battle of Lake Borgne in 1814, and sold in 1815.

Two were submarines:

- HMS Ambush (P418), launched in 1945, was an Amphion-class submarine.
- HMS Ambush (S120), launched in 2011, is an Astute-class submarine.
