= Ambush (band) =

Canadian country music group

- Origin: Ottawa, Ontario, Canada
- Genres: Country
- Years active: 1993–present
- Labels: Chancellor Music, Longshot Records, 306 Records
- Members: Mark McDonell; Kris Lafontaine; Danny Derue
- Past members: Jef Leeson; Glenn Desjardines; Skip Layton; Jim Wright; Riq Turner; Tommy VanCoughnett; Dan Killen
- Website: getambushed.com

Ambush is a Canadian country music group, formed in 1993, and based in Ottawa.

== Biography ==
The original line-up (from 1993 to 1999) consisted of Skip Layton (drums), Jef Leeson (bass guitar and lead vocals) and Mark McDonell (guitar and vocals). They met while working as the back-up band for Ottawa singer Dennis Whitty, and derived the name Ambush from the name of Whitty's backing band, 'Bushwacker'.

This line-up recorded three albums of cover songs: On Stage in 1993, Hard to Say No in 1994, and Kickin' Up a Fuss in 1995. All were produced by Leeson and released on his independent label Chancellor Music.

Through 1996, they recorded their first CD of original music in Nashville, with producer-writer Cyril Rawson. The CD, Ambush, yielded modest regional hits with "Since She Got Back From Texas" and "Girls Like That".

In 1997, a 3-track CD featuring the songs "Let's Go Crazy Girl", "Since She Got Back From Texas" and "Don't Let It Hit You on the Way Out" (all originally from their 1996 debut CD) was released, which included new vocals and remixes by Chad Irschick at Inception Sound Studios in Toronto.

Leeson left the band in November 1999 to pursue a solo career. He was replaced by Glenn Desjardine who, in November 2001, was replaced by Riq Turner. Riq departed in 2014, and was replaced by Kris Lafontaine. Skip Layton departed in October 2005; he was replaced by Jim Wright. Wright left the band in October 2011; he was replaced by Tom VanCoughnett. VanCoughnett departed in 2015; Dan Killen joined the band as a touring/session member until 2016, when he was replaced by Danny Derue. In 2002, Ambush signed with Longshot Records.

In 2006 Ambush won the CMT reality series Plucked. They shot videos for their songs "This Could Be The Night" and "In This Room" during the series.

In 2006, the band released a studio album entitled I Wanna Go Home With You. This album included singles such as "This Could Be The Night", "Too Hot For Words" and "Anything To Rock You".

At the 2007 Canadian Country Music Awards (CCMA Awards), the band was nominated as Group of the Year. They received the same nomination in 2008. At the latter ceremony, the "In This Room" video was nominated as Video of the Year.

Ambush has released seven live albums, most recently in 2016, with Ambush Live Off the Floor. They last toured in 2019, traveling to the UK to play the Tokyo World Festival and the Wireless Festival. As of 2021, the band remains active.

== Discography ==
Albums

- On Stage (1993), Chancellor
- Hard to Say No (1994), Chancellor
- Kickin' Up a Fuss (1995), Chancellor
- Ambush (1996), Chancellor
- Live (2002), Independent
- Ambush Live II (2003), Longshot Records
- I Wanna Go Home with You (2006), Independent
- Ambush Live: Three (2007), Longshot Records
- Live 4 (2008), Longshot Records
- Ambush (2009), 306 Records
- Ambush Classics (2009), Longshot Records
- Ambush Live in Cuba (2013), Longshot Records
- Ambush For Kidz! (2014), Longshot Records
- Ambush Christmas (2016), Longshot Records
- Ambush Live Off the Floor (2016), Longshot Records

EPs

- Let's Go Crazy (1997), Chancellor

Singles

Year	Single	Album
1995	"Since She Got Back from Texas"	Ambush (1995)
1996	"Girls Like That"	Ambush (1995)
2000	"Don't Give Up"	—N/a
2003	"Till You"	I Wanna Go Home with You
2005	"Party Like a Rock Star"	I Wanna Go Home with You
2005	"This Could Be the Night"	I Wanna Go Home with You
2006	"I Wanna Go Home with You"	I Wanna Go Home with You
2006	"Anything to Rock You"	I Wanna Go Home with You
2007	"In This Room"	Ambush (2009)
2008	"Wasn't That a Party"	Ambush (2009)
2008	"Drive"	Ambush (2009)
2009	"She Doesn't Come Close"	Ambush (2009)
2009	"Small Town"	Ambush (2009)
2010	"Take My Picture"	Ambush (2009)
2010	"My Little Girl"	Ambush (2009)
2013	"Daddy Come Home"	—N/a
2014	"Summertime Crazy"	—N/a
2015	"Little Big Man"	—N/a

=== Music videos ===
Year	Video
2006	"This Could Be the Night"
2007	"In This Room"
2009	"She Doesn't Come Close"
2017	"Top of the World"

== Achievements ==
- Champions of the CMT reality series Plucked (2006)

== Awards and nominations ==
Year	Association	Category	Result
2006	Canadian Country Music Association	Independent Group or Duo of the Year	Nominated
2007	Canadian Country Music Association	Group or Duo of the Year	Nominated
2007	Canadian Country Music Association	Independent Group or Duo of the Year	Nominated
2008	Canadian Country Music Association	Group or Duo of the Year	Nominated
2008	Canadian Country Music Association	CMT Video of the Year – "In This Room"	Nominated
