= Ophelia (Waterhouse) =

1894 painting by John William Waterhouse

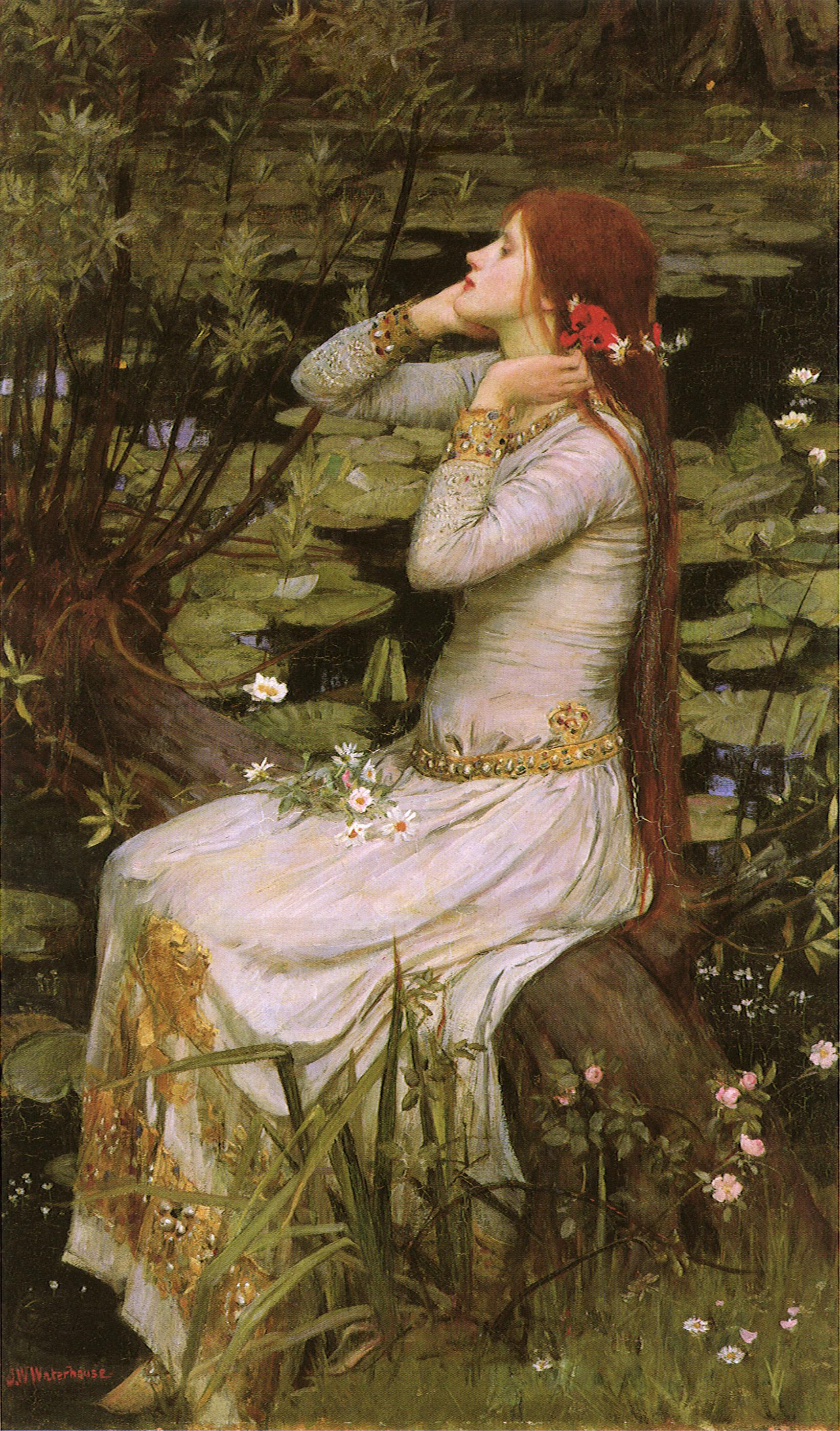
- Artist: John William Waterhouse
- Year: 1894
- Medium: Oil on canvas
- Dimensions: 73.6 cm × 124.4 cm (29.0 in × 49.0 in)
- Location: Private collection

Ophelia is an 1894 oil on canvas painting by the English painter John William Waterhouse, depicting a character in William Shakespeare's drama Hamlet. She is a young noblewoman of Denmark, a potential wife for Prince Hamlet. In the 1894 version Ophelia is depicted, in the last moments before her death, sitting on a willow branch extending out over a pond of lilies. Her royal dress strongly contrasts with her natural surroundings. Waterhouse has placed flowers on her lap and in her hair, tying her into her natural surroundings.

== See also ==
- List of paintings by John William Waterhouse
- Ophelia, a painting of 1851–52 by John Everett Millais
