= Ofelia Island =

Island in Graham Land, Antarctica

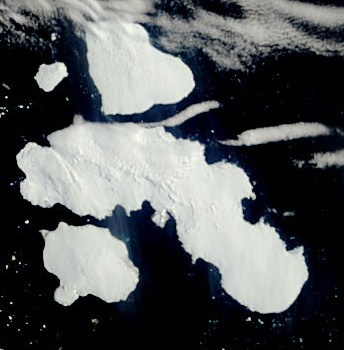
- D'Urville, Joinville and Dundee Islands (top to bottom)

- Location within Antarctica Location within Antarctic Peninsula

Geography
- Location: Antarctica
- Coordinates: 63°11′18″S 55°29′50″W
- Archipelago: Joinville Island group
- Length: 560 m (1840 ft)
- Width: 270 m (890 ft)

Administration
- Antarctica
- Administered under the Antarctic Treaty System

Demographics
- Population: uninhabited

Ofelia Island (Bulgarian: остров Офелия, romanized: ostrov Ofelia, IPA: [ˈɔstrof oˈfɛlijɐ]) is the 560 m long in southeast-northwest direction and 270 m wide rocky island in Ambush Bay on the north coast of Joinville Island in the Joinville Island group, Antarctica.

The island is “named after the ocean fishing trawler Ofelia of the Bulgarian company Ocean Fisheries – Burgas that operated in Antarctic waters off South Georgia during its fishing trip under Captain Nikola Levenov from September 1977 to April 1978. The Bulgarian fishermen, along with those of the Soviet Union, Poland and East Germany are the pioneers of modern Antarctic fishing industry.”

== Location ==
Ofelia Island is located at 63°11′18″S 55°29′50″W, which is 3.18 km south-southwest of King Point, 4.72 km west-southwest of Dalrymple Point and 7.9 km north-northeast of Taylor Nunataks. British mapping in 1973.

== Maps ==
- Joinville Island. Scale 1:250000 topographic map SP 21-22/14. Directorate of Overseas Surveys, 1973.
- Antarctic Digital Database (ADD). Scale 1:250000 topographic map of Antarctica. Scientific Committee on Antarctic Research (SCAR). Since 1993, regularly upgraded and updated.
