= Ophelia (Millais) =

1852 painting by John Everett Millais

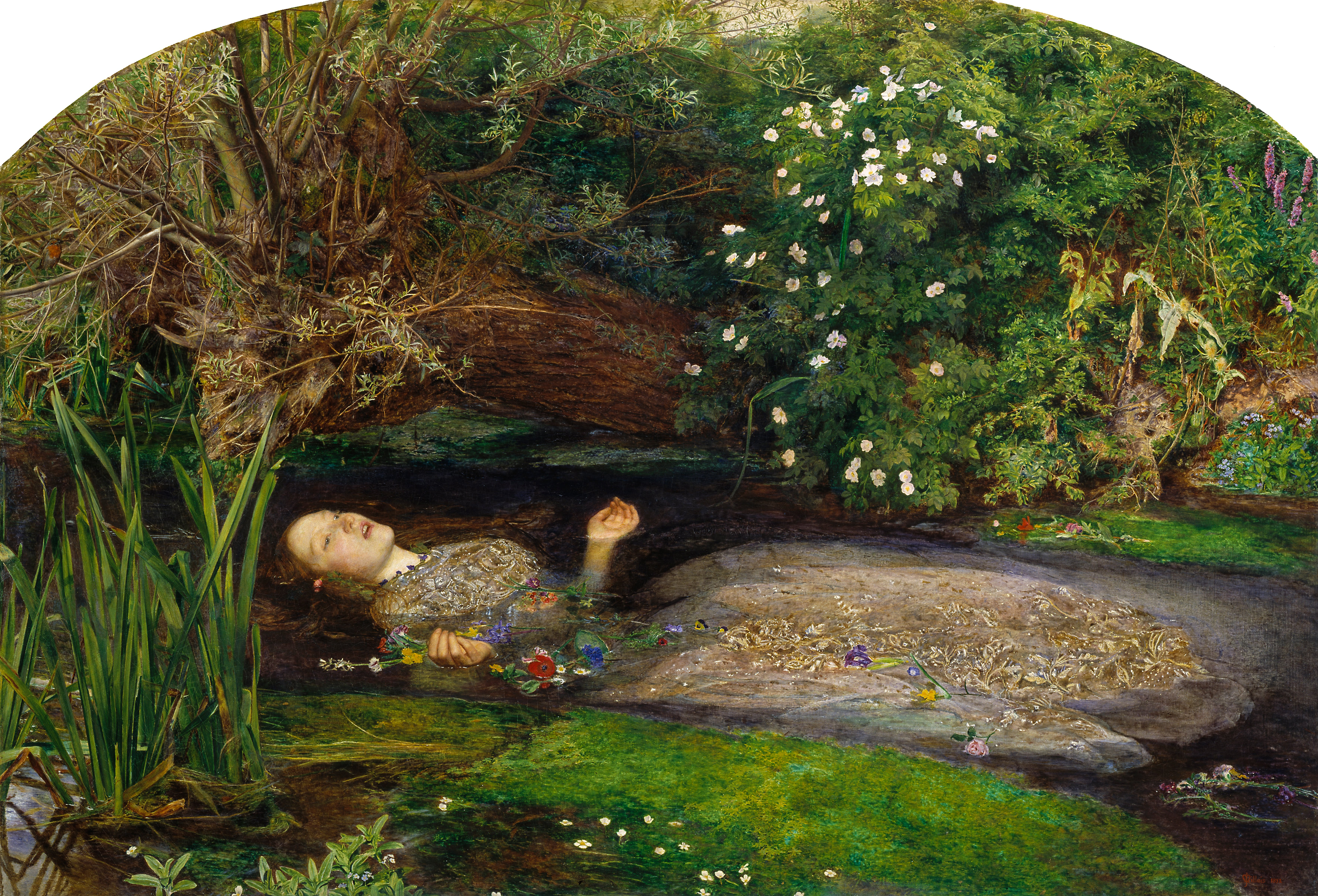
- Artist: John Everett Millais
- Year: 1851–1852
- Medium: Oil on canvas
- Dimensions: 30.0 inches (76.2 cm) × 44.0 inches (111.8 cm)
- Location: Tate Britain, London

Ophelia is an 1852 painting by British artist John Everett Millais. It forms part of the collection of Tate Britain, in London. The painting depicts the young Ophelia in William Shakespeare's play Hamlet, who, due to Hamlet's actions, loses her sanity and drowns.

The painting, modelled by Elizabeth Siddal, received mixed responses when first exhibited at the Royal Academy of Arts in London, but is today widely regarded as one of the most important mid-nineteenth-century works, and is renowned for its beauty and the detail of its natural setting. The work has influenced artists such as John William Waterhouse, Peter Blake, Ed Ruscha and Friedrich Heyser.

== Theme and elements ==
The painting depicts Ophelia singing as she floats on the river just before she drowns. The scene is described in Act 4, Scene 7 of Hamlet in a speech by Queen Gertrude.

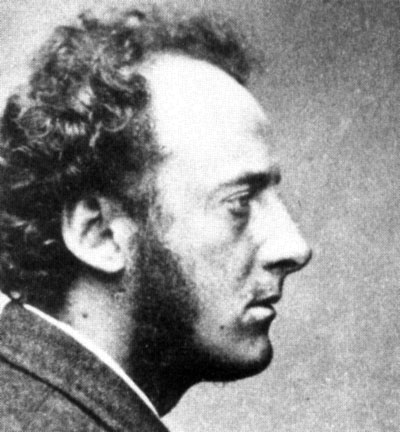
John Everett Millais in 1865, by Charles Dodgson (Lewis Carroll)

The episode depicted is not usually seen onstage, as in Shakespeare's text it exists only in Gertrude's description. Out of her mind with grief, Ophelia has been making garlands of wildflowers. She climbs into a willow tree overhanging a brook to dangle some from its branches, and a bough breaks beneath her. She lies in the water singing songs, as if unaware of her danger ("incapable of her own distress"). Her clothes, trapping air, have allowed her to temporarily stay afloat ("Her clothes spread wide, / And, mermaid-like, awhile they bore her up."). But eventually, "her garments, heavy with their drink, / Pull'd the poor wretch from her melodious lay" down "to muddy death".

Ophelia's death has been praised as one of the most poetically written death scenes in literature.

Ophelia's pose—her open arms and upwards gaze—also resembles traditional portrayals of saints or martyrs, but has also been interpreted as erotic.

The painting is known for its depiction of the detailed flora of the river and its banks, highlighting the patterns of growth and decay in a natural ecosystem. Despite its nominal Danish setting, the landscape has come to be seen as quintessentially English. Ophelia was painted along the banks of the Hogsmill River in Surrey, near Tolworth. Barbara Webb, a resident of nearby Old Malden, devoted much time to locating the exact spot of the picture, and, according to her research, the scene is at Six Acre Meadow, alongside Church Road, Old Malden. Millais Road is now nearby. Millais's close colleague William Holman Hunt was at the time working on his The Hireling Shepherd nearby.

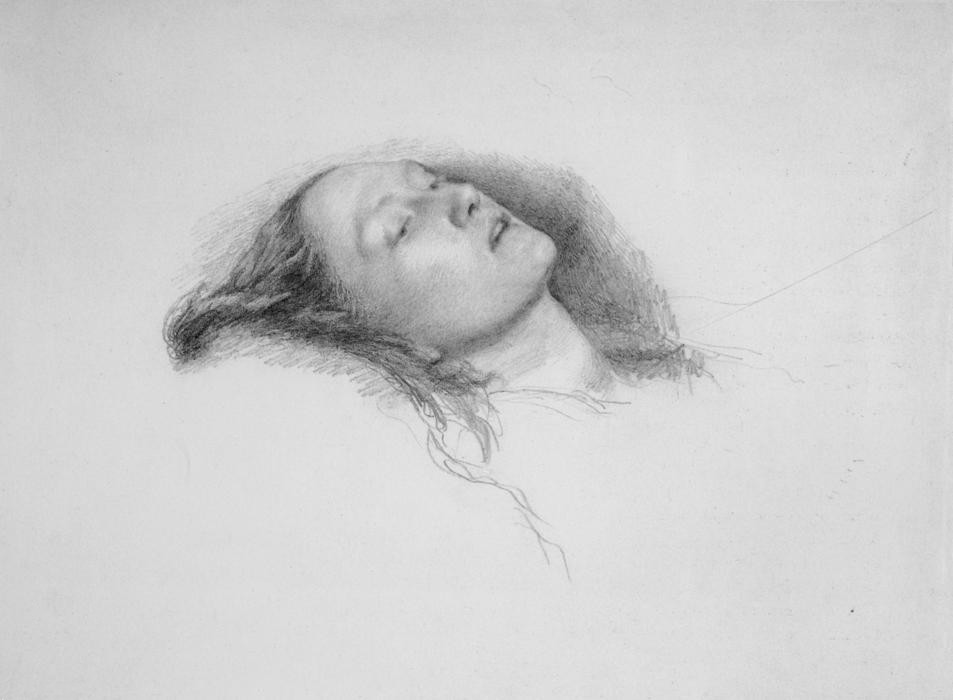
Study for the painting, 1852

The flowers shown floating on the river were chosen to correspond with Shakespeare's description of Ophelia's garland. They also reflect the Victorian interest in the "language of flowers", according to which each flower carries a symbolic meaning. The prominent red poppy—not mentioned by Shakespeare's description of the scene—represents sleep and death.

At an early stage in the painting's creation, Millais painted a water vole—which an assistant had fished out of the Hogsmill—paddling next to Ophelia. In December 1851, he showed the unfinished painting to Holman Hunt's relatives. He recorded in his diary, "Hunt's uncle and aunt came, both of whom understood most gratifyingly every object except my water rat. The male relation, when invited to guess at it, eagerly pronounced it to be a hare. Perceiving by our smiles that he had made a mistake, a rabbit was then hazarded. After which I have a faint recollection of a dog or a cat being mentioned." Millais painted the water vole out of the final picture, although a rough sketch of it still exists in an upper corner of the canvas, hidden by its frame.

In keeping with the tenets of the Pre-Raphaelite Brotherhood (PRB), of which he was a member, Millais used bright colours, gave close attention to detail and faithful truth to nature. This rendition of Ophelia is the epitome of the PRB style; first, because of the subject matter, depicting a woman who has lived a life awaiting happiness, only to find her destiny on the verge of death: the vulnerable woman is a popular subject among Pre-Raphaelite artists. Also, Millais uses bright, intense colours in the landscape to make the pale Ophelia stand out against the natural background behind her. All this is evident in the vivid attention to detail in the brush and trees around Ophelia, the contouring of her face, and the intricate work Millais did on her dress.

== Painting process ==
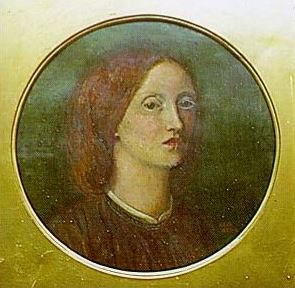
An 1854 self-portrait by Elizabeth Siddal, who acted as Millais's model for Ophelia

Millais produced Ophelia in two separate stages: He first painted the landscape, and secondly the figure of Ophelia. Having found a suitable setting for the picture, Millais remained on the banks of the Hogsmill River in Old Malden—within a stone's throw of where fellow Pre-Raphaelite William Holman Hunt painted The Light of the World—for up to 11 hours a day, six days a week, over a five-month period in 1851, which allowed him to depict the natural scene before him with optimal accuracy.

Millais encountered various difficulties during the process. He wrote in a letter to a friend, "The flies of Surrey are more muscular, and have a still greater propensity for probing human flesh. I am threatened with a notice to appear before a magistrate for trespassing in a field and destroying the hay... and am also in danger of being blown by the wind into the water. Certainly the painting of a picture under such circumstances would be greater punishment to a murderer than hanging." By November 1851, the weather had turned windy and snowy. Millais oversaw the building of a hut "made of four hurdles, like a sentry-box, covered outside with straw". According to Millais, sitting inside the hut made him feel like Robinson Crusoe. William Holman Hunt was so impressed by the hut that he had an identical one built for himself.

Ophelia was modelled by artist and muse Elizabeth Siddall, then 22 years old. Millais had Siddall lie fully clothed in a full bathtub in his studio at 7 Gower Street in London. As it was now winter, he placed oil lamps under the tub to warm the water, but was so intent on his work that he allowed them to go out. As a result, Siddall caught a severe cold, and her father later sent Millais a letter demanding £50 for medical expenses. According to Millais's son, he eventually accepted a lower sum.

== Reception ==
When Ophelia was first publicly exhibited at the Royal Academy in London in 1852, it was not universally acclaimed. A critic in The Times wrote that "there must be something strangely perverse in an imagination which souses Ophelia in a weedy ditch, and robs the drowning struggle of that lovelorn maiden of all pathos and beauty", while a further review in the same newspaper said that "Mr. Millais's Ophelia in her pool ... makes us think of a dairymaid in a frolic". Even the art critic John Ruskin, an avid supporter of Millais, while finding the technique of the painting "exquisite", expressed doubts about the decision to set it in a Surrey landscape and asked, "Why the mischief should you not paint pure nature, and not that rascally wirefenced garden-rolled-nursery-maid's paradise?"

In the 20th century, Salvador Dalí wrote glowingly in an article published in a 1936 edition of the French Surrealist journal Minotaure about the artistic movement that inspired the painting. "How could Salvador Dalí fail to be dazzled by the flagrant surrealism of English Pre-Raphaelitism. The Pre-Raphaelite painters bring us radiant women who are, at the same time, the most desirable and most frightening that exist."

== Influence ==
The painting has been widely referred to and pastiched in art, film, and photography, notably in Laurence Olivier's 1948 film Hamlet, where it formed the basis for the portrayal of Ophelia's death. The sleeve of the 1971 psychedelic folk album Beautiful Lies You Could Live In by Tom Rapp and Pearls Before Swine reproduces the painting. A scene in Wes Craven's 1972 film The Last House on the Left was modelled on the painting, while the video for Nick Cave's song "Where the Wild Roses Grow" depicts Kylie Minogue mimicking the pose of the image. The artwork is also referenced in Fire With Fire, a 1986 film in which a schoolgirl is replicating the central image as the protagonists meet. The imagery of the painting is evoked in the prologue of Lars von Trier's 2011 film Melancholia, where Kirsten Dunst's character Justine floats in a slow-moving stream. In 2022, Red Velvet member Joy recreated Ophelia in the music video for Red Velvet's song Feel My Rhythm. In 2025, Taylor Swift referenced the painting for her album cover for The Life of a Showgirl.

== Provenance and valuation ==
Ophelia was purchased from Millais on 10 December 1851 by the art dealer Henry Farrer for 300 guineas, approximately equal to £40,000 in 2020. Farrer sold the painting to B. G. Windus, an avid collector of Pre-Raphaelite art, who sold it on in 1862 for 748 guineas. The painting is now in Tate Britain, London, and is valued by experts as worth at least £30 million.

== See also ==
- List of paintings by John Everett Millais
