= Joanne Johnson =

British geologist and Antarctic scientist

- Born: Joanne S. Garner; 1977 (age 48–49); Birmingham
- Education: King Edward VI High School for Girls
- Alma mater: University of Durham (BSc); University of Cambridge (PhD)
- Awards: Laws Prize (2008); Marie Tharp Fellowship (2010); Polar Medal (2023)
- Scientific career
- Fields: Geology
- Workplaces: British Antarctic Survey
- Thesis: Magmatism of the Vitim Volcanic Field, Baikal Rift Zone, Siberia (2002)
- Doctoral advisor: Sally A. Gibson
- Website: www.bas.ac.uk/profile/jsj

Joanne S. "Jo" Johnson (born 1977, née Garner) is a British geologist and Antarctic scientist, who has worked for British Antarctic Survey (BAS) since 2002. She works in the palaeoenvironments, ice sheets and climate change team and is best known for her work on glacial retreat. She was awarded the Polar medal in 2023. The Johnson Mesa in James Ross Island, Antarctica is named in her honour.

== Early life and education ==
Johnson decided to follow a science career after enjoying studying science at King Edward VI High School for Girls during her teenage years. In 1998, Johnson obtained a BSc degree in Geology (1st class) from Durham University (Hatfield College). She then went on to complete a PhD in 2002, supervised by at Clare College, Cambridge, with a thesis on Magmatism of the Vitim Volcanic Field, Baikal Rift Zone, Siberia. The research consisted of using geochemical characteristics of lavas to study the composition and thickness of the lithosphere in the Baikal Rift Zone of Siberia, and to improve understanding of the melting regime beneath the region during the Cenozoic.

== Career and research ==
After her PhD, Johnson began work at British Antarctic Survey (BAS). The first project she worked on (2002–2005) was an analysis of the origin and implications of authigenic alteration minerals in volcaniclastic rocks from James Ross Island. In 2005–2009, she worked in the QWAD (Quaternary West Antarctic Deglaciation project), within the GRADES (Glacial Retreat in Antarctica and Deglaciation of the Earth System) programme at BAS, reconstructing Quaternary thinning history of Pine Island Glacier. Her work showed that Pine Island Glacier thinned as rapidly 8000 years ago as it is at the present day.

From 2015 to 2020, Johnson worked as a principle investigator on a Natural Environment Research Council (NERC) funded project "Reconstructing millennial-scale ice sheet change in the western Amundsen Sea Embayment, Antarctica, using high-precision exposure dating", with a team from BAS, Imperial College London, Durham University, Columbia University (USA) and Pennsylvania State University (USA). She is also working on other projects including

- Exploring feedbacks between glaciation, volcanism and climate in Antarctica: studying carbon dioxide outgassing from the James Ross Island lavas using melt inclusions in olivines
- Determining Quaternary glacial history of the Lassiter Coast, Antarctica
- Comminution dating boundary conditions: A study of (^{234}U/^{238}U) disequilibrium along the Antarctic Peninsula
- Antarctic Peninsula exhumation and landscape development investigated by low-temperature detrital thermochronometry

Some of her research has taken place in remote parts of the West Antarctic Ice Sheet.

From 2018- 2025, Johnson worked as the Lead UK principal investigator for a project within the International Thwaites Glacier Collaboration. During this time Johnson studied Thwaites Glacier and its stability in order to find implications on future sea-level rise.

=== Publications ===
Her publications include:

- Collaborating On Glacial Research
- Rapid thinning of Pine Island Glacier in the early Holocene
- Zeolite compositions as proxies for eruptive palaeoenvironment
- Volcanism in the Vitim Volcanic Field, Siberia: Geochemical Evidence for a Mantle Plume Beneath the Baikal Rift Zone

=== Awards and honours ===
Johnson was awarded the Laws Prize by BAS in 2008 and the Columbia University, Marie Tharp Fellowship for 2010–2011. The three-month fellowship allowed Johnson to collaborate with scientists at Lamont–Doherty Earth Observatory with the results published in the journal Science.

In January 2007 the UK Antarctic Place-Names Committee named a feature on James Ross Island, Antarctica after her, in recognition of her work which led to a new proxy for recognising past ice sheets using alteration mineral chemistry. Johnson Mesa, James Ross Island, Antarctica (63° 49'40"S, 57° 55'22"W) is a large flat-topped volcanic mountain north of Abernethy Flats, between Crame Col and Bibby Point on Ulu Peninsula, James Ross Island.

Johnson was awarded a Polar medal in the 2023 New Year's Honours list.

== Personal life ==
Johnson is married with two children (2008 and 2013): She has spoken about the challenges of doubling as a scientist and mother: "The hardest thing is being torn between your personal and professional ambitions…Wanting to go to conferences, but not wanting to leave your children. Having to leave work early or drop everything if you get a phone call that she's sick. You could be in the middle of a complicated thought process and you have to start again."

In August 2021, Johnson appeared on BBC1's Songs of Praise discussing her work and her Christian faith. She states that her expeditions refresh her faith and that how being in the Antarctic it is "the closest you can get to God".
