= The Naze (James Ross Island) =

Peninsula on James Ross Island, Antarctica

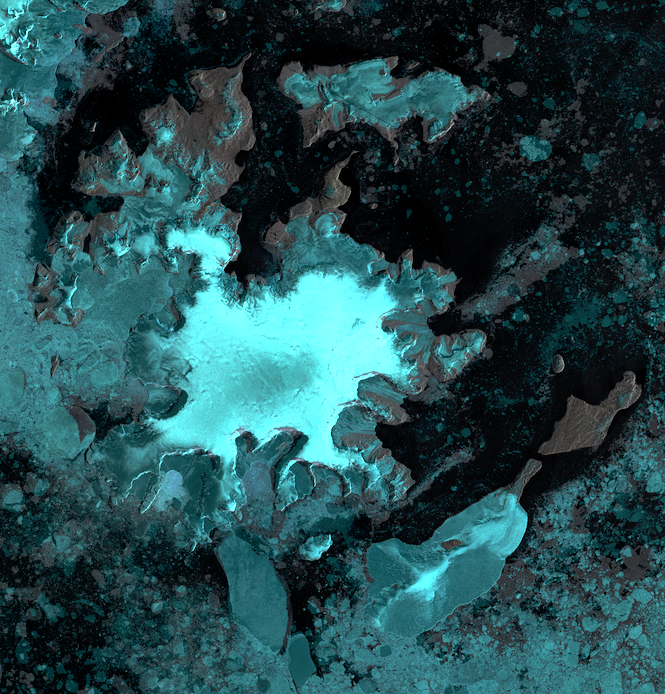
- James Ross Island. The Naze in upper right. Vega Island to its north

- Location within Antarctica

Geography
- Coordinates: 63°57′S 57°32′W

Administration
- Antarctica

The Naze (63°57′S 57°32′W) is a peninsula in north James Ross Island, marking the southeast entrance to Herbert Sound and extending about 5 nautical miles (9.3 km; 5.8 mi) northeast from Terrapin Hill toward the south-central shore of Vega Island.

== Location ==
Trinity Peninsula on Antarctic Peninsula. James Ross Island east of the tip

The Naze is to the east of Croft Bay extending north into Herbert Sound towards Vega Island. It is east of Ulu Peninsula, which forms the west side of Croft Bay, and north of Mount Haddington.

== Discovery and name ==
The Naze was discovered and named "Nasudden" by the Swedish Antarctic Expedition (SwedAE), 1901-04, under Otto Nordenskjöld. The recommended form is the English version used by Nordenskjold.

== Features ==
=== Terrapin Hill ===
63°58′S 57°32′W. Rounded, reddish-colored hill, 545 metres (1,788 ft) high, standing at the south end of The Naze. This area was first explored by the SwedAE, 1901-04, under Otto Nordenskjöld. Terrapin Hill was first charted by the FIDS, 1945, who in 1948 applied this name which is descriptive of its shape.

=== Fortress Hill ===
63°56′S 57°31′W. A hill, 120 metres (390 ft) high, which stands 2 nautical miles (3.7 km; 2.3 mi) north of Terrapin Hill in northern James Ross Island. Charted in 1946 by the Falkland Islands Dependencies Survey (FIDS), who gave this descriptive name.

=== Hurst Bay ===
63°57′S 57°28′W. A small bay on the east side of The Naze. Following hydrographic work in the area from HMS Endurance, 1981-82, named by the UK Antarctic Place-Names Committee (UK-APC) after Commander William E. Hurst, RN, the ship's navigating officer.

=== Dagger Peak ===
63°55′S 57°29′W. Rock peak rising steeply from sea level to about 90 metres (300 ft) high at the west end of Comb Ridge, located near the extremity of The Naze. This area was first explored in 1902 by the SwedAE under Otto Nordenskjöld. The peak was charted and given this descriptive name by the FIDS in 1945.

=== Comb Ridge ===
63°55′S 57°28′W. A ridge which rises to 105 metres (344 ft) high and forms the east and major part of the hill at the extremity of The Naze. Probably first sighted in 1902 by the SwedAE under Otto Nordenskjöld. It was charted and given this descriptive name by the FIDS in 1946.

== Sources ==
- Alberts, Fred G., ed. (1995), Geographic Names of the Antarctic (PDF) (2 ed.), United States Board on Geographic Names This article incorporates public domain material from websites or documents of the United States Board on Geographic Names.
- Graham Land and South Shetland Islands, BAS: British Antarctic Survey, 2005

This article incorporates public domain material from websites or documents of the United States Geological Survey.
