= Röhss Bay =

- James Ross Island. Röhss Bay in the west

- Location within Antarctica
- Coordinates: 64°12′S 58°16′W
- Type: Bay

Röhss Bay (64°12′S 58°16′W) is a bay 11 nautical miles (20 km; 13 mi) wide, between Cape Broms and Cape Obelisk on the southwest side of James Ross Island, Antarctica.

== Location ==
Trinity Peninsula on Antarctic Peninsula. James Ross Island east of the tip

Röhss Bay indents the west shore of James Ross Island, which lies to the southwest of Trinity Peninsula, at the tip of the Antarctic Peninsula in Graham Land. It is separated from the Detroit Plateau and Mount Tucker on the peninsula by Prince Gustav Channel. It is south of the Ulu Peninsula and west of Mount Haddington.

== Discovery and name ==
Röhss Bay was discovered by the Swedish Antarctic Expedition (SwedAE), 1901-04, under Otto Nordenskjöld, and named by him for August and Wilhelm Röhss, patrons of the expedition.

== Features ==
=== Cape Obelisk ===
64°08′S 58°27′W. Cape at the north side of the entrance to Röhss Bay. Discovered and named by the SwedAE, 1901-04, under Otto Nordenskjöld. The name is descriptive of a conspicuous rock pinnacle about 2 nautical miles (3.7 km; 2.3 mi) within the headland, which is visible from northwestward and southward.

=== Obelisk Col ===
64°07′S 58°24′W. A col at about 150 metres (490 ft) high on the east side of Cape Obelisk, aligned north–south between Rum Cove and Röhss Bay. Named after Cape Obelisk by the UK-APC in 1983.

=== Molley Corner ===
64°09′S 58°19′W. A point on the north side of Röhss Bay, 3 nautical miles (5.6 km; 3.5 mi) east of Cape Obelisk. Named by the UK Antarctic Place-Names Committee (UK-APC) in 1983 after William Molley, Third Mate in HMS Terror of the British expedition, 1839-43, under Captain James Clark Ross.

=== Flatcap Point ===
64°07′S 58°07′W. The most northerly of two relatively low flat-topped rock cliffs on the east side of the northern arm of Röhss Bay. Mapped from surveys by the Falkland Islands Dependencies Survey (FIDS) (1960-61). The descriptive name was given by UK-APC.

=== Sentinel Buttress ===
64°04′S 58°08′W. A prominent crag containing a volcanic breccia sequence, rising to 535 metres (1,755 ft) high east of Palisade Nunatak at the head of Röhss Bay. So named by the UK-APC in 1987 from its commanding position in the area.

=== Cape Broms ===
64°20′S 58°18′W. Cape which marks the south side of the entrance to Röhss Bay. Discovered by the SwedAE, 1901-04, under Otto Nordenskjöld, who named it for G.E. Broms, a patron of the expedition.

=== Persson Island ===
64°13′S 58°24′W. An island 1.5 nautical miles (2.8 km; 1.7 mi) long, lying in the entrance to Röhss Bay on the southwest side of James Ross Island. Discovered by the SwedAE under Otto Nordenskjöld, 1901-04, and named by him for Nils Persson, a patron of the expedition.

== Sources ==
- Alberts, Fred G., ed. (1995), Geographic Names of the Antarctic (PDF) (2 ed.), United States Board on Geographic Names This article incorporates public domain material from websites or documents of the United States Board on Geographic Names.
- Graham Land and South Shetland Islands, BAS: British Antarctic Survey, 2005

This article incorporates public domain material from websites or documents of the United States Geological Survey.
