= San José Pass =

Pass on James Ross Island, Antarctica

Coordinates: 63°55′S 57°54′W

San Jose Pass is a pass trending NW-SE and rising to about 200 m between Lachman Crags and Stickle Ridge on James Ross Island. On either side of this pass there are exposures of fossiliferous Cretaceous rocks. Following work in the area, named "Paso San Jose" after Saint Joseph by an Argentine Antarctic Expedition (announced 1979 by Argentina Ministerio de Defensa).
