= Ball Glacier =

Ball Glacier may refer to:

- Ball Glacier (James Ross Island), Antarctica
- Ball Glacier (Victoria Land), Antarctica
- Ball Glacier (New Zealand)
