= Crame Col =

Crame Col (63°49′S 57°53′W) is a col at about 175 metres (570 ft) near the northern tip of James Ross Island, trending northeast–southwest between the Bibby Point massif and the Lachman Crags. Following geological work by the British Antarctic Survey (BAS), 1981–83, it was named by the UK Antarctic Place-Names Committee after James A. Crame, a BAS geologist from 1976, who worked in the area, 1981–82.
