= Kotick =

Kotick may mean:

- Kotick, the name of a fur seal in Rudyard Kipling's story The White Seal
- Teddy Kotick (1928–1986), jazz bassist
- Bobby Kotick (born 1963), American businessman
- Kotick Point (64°0′S 58°22′W), a place on the west coast of James Ross Island, Antarctica
