= Ohlin Island =

Island in the Palmer Archipelago, Antarctica

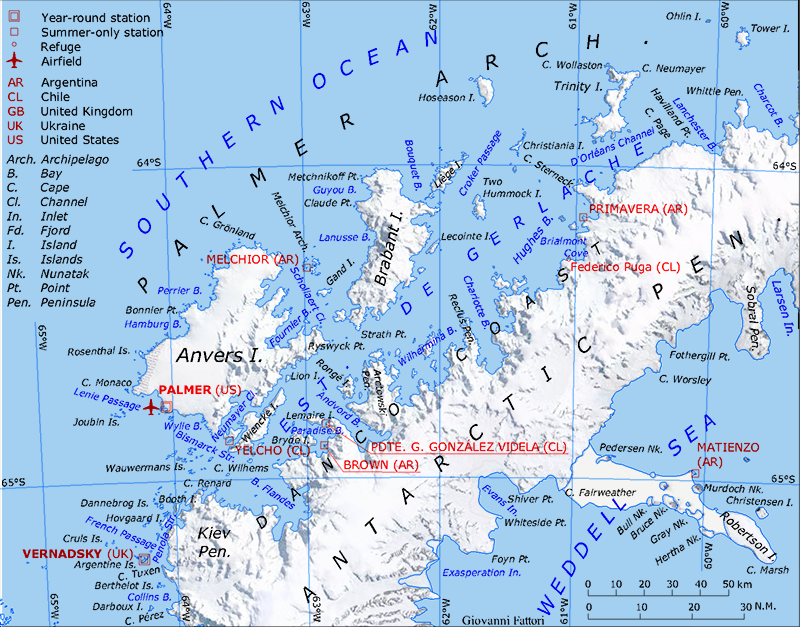
- Ohlin Island is in the upper right corner

- Location within Antarctica

Geography
- Location: Antarctica
- Coordinates: 63°30′S 60°07′W
- Archipelago: Palmer Archipelago

Administration
- Administered under the Antarctic Treaty System

Demographics
- Population: Uninhabited

Ohlin Island or Bailys Island is an island lying 11 kilometres (6 nmi) west of the north end of Tower Island in the Palmer Archipelago. Ohlin Island was discovered by the Swedish Antarctic Expedition (1901–1904) and named by Otto Nordenskiöld for Axel Ohlin, zoologist with the expedition.

== See also ==
- Composite Antarctic Gazetteer
- List of Antarctic islands south of 60° S
- Physeter Rocks
- SCAR
- Territorial claims in Antarctica
