= Hobbs Glacier =

Hobbs Glacier may refer to:

- Hobbs Glacier (James Ross Island), Antarctica
- Hobbs Glacier (Victoria Land), Antarctica
- Hobbs Glacier (New Zealand)
