= Blancmange (disambiguation) =

Blancmange is a jelly or pudding dessert made of milk, sugar, gelatin and flavouring. It may also refer to:

- Blancmange curve, a fractal which is considered to resemble a blancmange.
- Blancmange (band), an English synth-pop band prominent in the 1980s.
- Blancmange Hill on James Ross Island in the Antarctic.
