= Spath Peninsula =

Peninsula in Antarctica

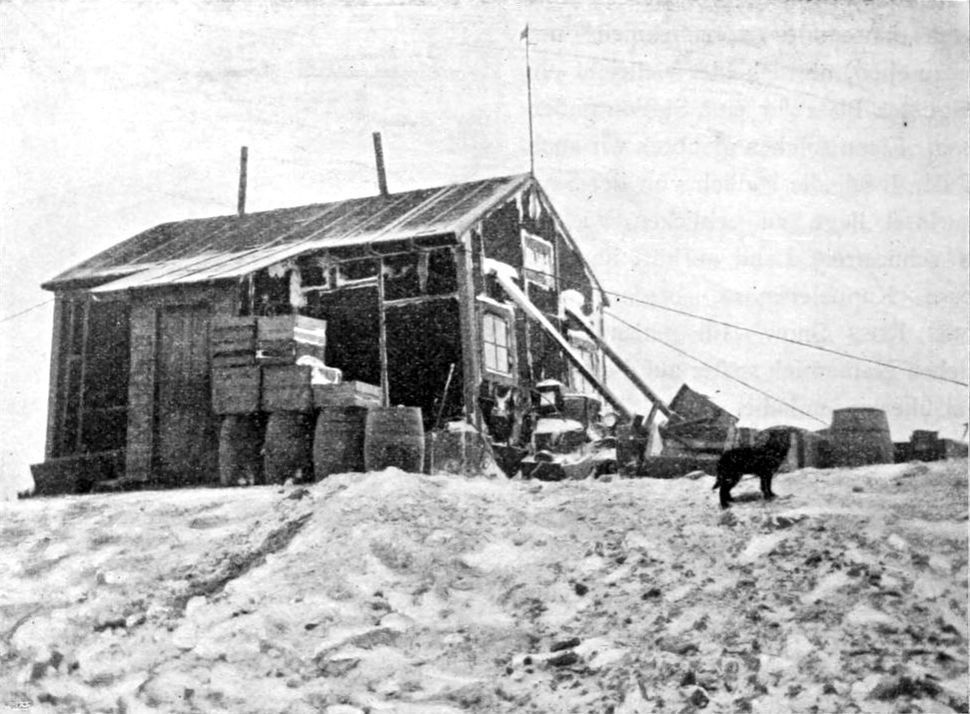
Nordenskiöld House, 1902 photograph

Spath Peninsula (64°21′S 56°55′W) is an ice-free peninsula, 4.0 mi (6.5 km), forming the northeast extremity of Snow Hill Island. Historic Nordenskjold's Hut, Antarctic Historic Site #28, is located on the west coast of the peninsula. The Karlsen Cliffs form the peninsula's northwest coast. Wickens Gully, a water-cut ravine, cuts into clay-rich rocks on the peninsula's east side.

The peninsula has several distinct hills on it. Thyasira Hill is a distinctive hill within a group of smaller hills rising to about 60 m (200 ft) tall, 250–300 m (820–980 ft) south of Nordenskjold's Hut. Tesore Hill rises about 160 m (520 ft) high on the east side of the peninsula.

== Naming ==
The peninsula and its features were named by the United Kingdom Antarctic Place-Names Committee (UK-APC) in 1995. The peninsula was named for Leonard Frank Spath (1882–1957), eminent UK paleontologist. The cliffs and gully were named for Anders Karlsen, First Engineer on the Swedish Antarctic Expedition, 1901–04 and Professor Otto Wilckens, eminent German paleontologist, respectively. Thyasira Hill was named because of the abundance of the fossil bivalve mollusk Thyasira townsendi found in this area. Tesore Hill is the English translation of the original Argentine name "Cerro Tesore".
