= Michael Hambrey =

Michael John Hambrey is a glaciologist and emeritus professor at Aberystwyth University. His research focuses on glacial processes and the history of glaciers and ice sheets, particularly in Antarctica and the Arctic.

Hambrey was awarded the Polar Medal in 1989 for his polar research, and received a second clasp to the medal in 2011 for Arctic and Antarctic service. In 2018, he received the Scientific Committee on Antarctic Research Medal for Excellence in Antarctic Research for his contributions to glaciology. Hambrey Cliffs on James Ross Island in Antarctica were named after him.
