= Markham Bay =

Markham Bay may refer to:

- Markham Bay (Antarctica)
- Markham Bay (Papua New Guinea)
- Markham Bay (Baffin Island)
