= Physeter Rocks =

Rock formation of the Palmer Archipelago

Physeter Rocks (63°31′S 60°9′W) is a small group of rocks lying to the west of Ohlin Island, Palmer Archipelago, Antarctica. The rocks were photographed by Falkland Islands and Dependencies Aerial Survey Expedition (FIDASE), 1956–57, and mapped from these photos. They are named by the United Kingdom Antarctic Place-Names Committee (UK-APC) in 1960 after the sperm whale, occasionally known as Physeter catodon.
