= Axel Ohlin =

Swedish zoologist and explorer

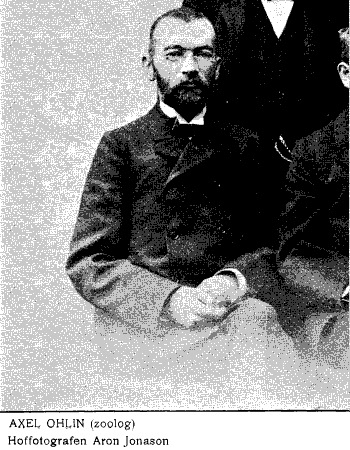
- Axel Ohlin
- Born: 31 July 1867; Visingsö, Sweden
- Died: 12 July 1903 (aged 35); Sävsjö
- Occupations: Zoologist; Explorer

Axel Gabriel Ohlin (31 July 1867 – 12 July 1903) was a Swedish zoologist and Arctic and Antarctic explorer.

== Biography ==
He was born in Visingsö to Per Ohlin and Hedda Hjertstedt. He was a student at Lund University earning a philosophy degree in 1890 and a doctorate in 1896. In 1894, Ohlin participated in a search operation after the missing Björling–Kallstenius Expedition. In 1895–1896, he participated in Otto Nordenskjöld's mineralogical expeditions to Patagonia. In 1898, he joined with Alfred Nathorst's expedition on the ship Antarctic to Bear Island, Svalbard and Kong Karls Land. He participated in the Swedish Antarctic Expedition (1901–1904) led by Otto Nordenskjöld and Carl Anton Larsen. Ohlin Island, discovered during the Swedish Antarctic Expedition, is named after him.

Among his works are På forskningsfärd efter Björling och Kallstenius (1895), and Arctic Crustacea collected during the swedish arctic expeditions 1898, 1899 and 1900 (1901).
