= Important Bird Area =

Area recognized as a habitat for bird population conservation

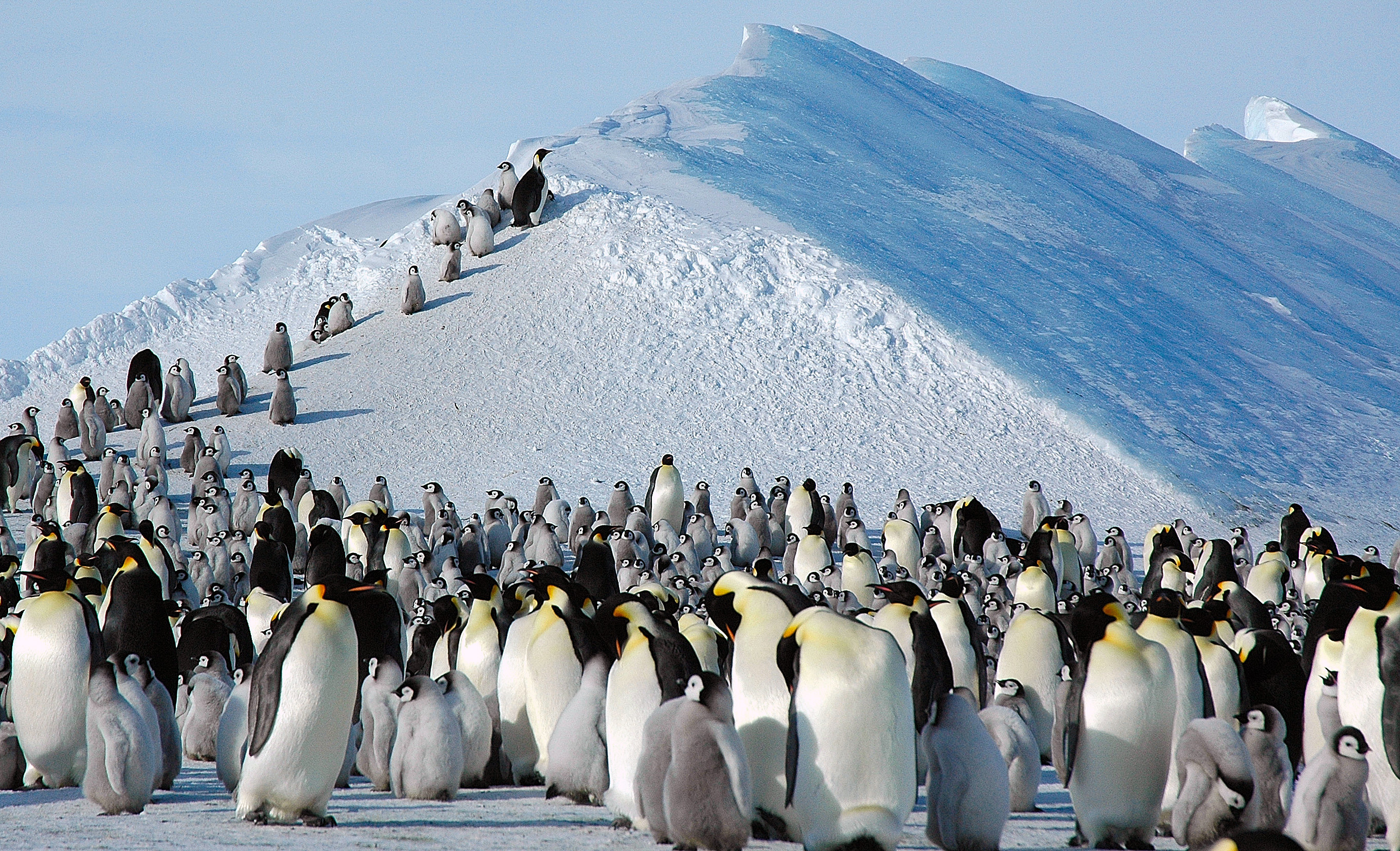
Snow Hill Island off the east coast of the Antarctic Peninsula has been identified as an IBA

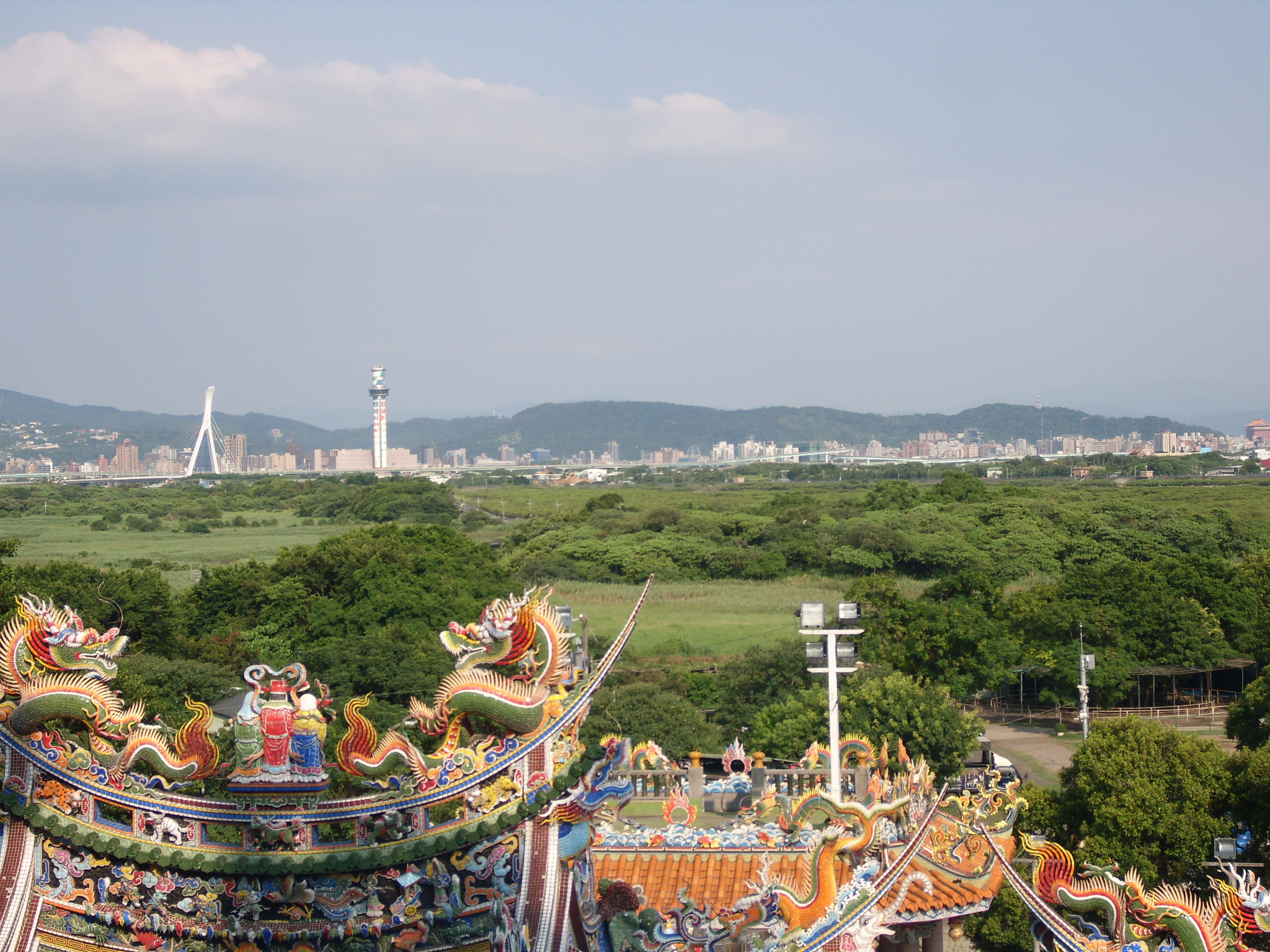
IBA at Guandu Nature Park in Taipei, Taiwan.

An Important Bird and Biodiversity Area (IBA) is an area identified using an internationally agreed set of criteria as being globally important for the conservation of bird populations.

IBA was developed and sites are identified by BirdLife International. There are over 13,000 IBAs worldwide. These sites are small enough to be entirely conserved and differ in their character, habitat or ornithological importance from the surrounding habitat. In the United States the program is administered by the National Audubon Society.

Often IBAs form part of a country's existing protected area network, and so are protected under national legislation. Legal recognition and protection of IBAs that are not within existing protected areas varies within different countries. Some countries have a National IBA Conservation Strategy, whereas in others protection is completely lacking.

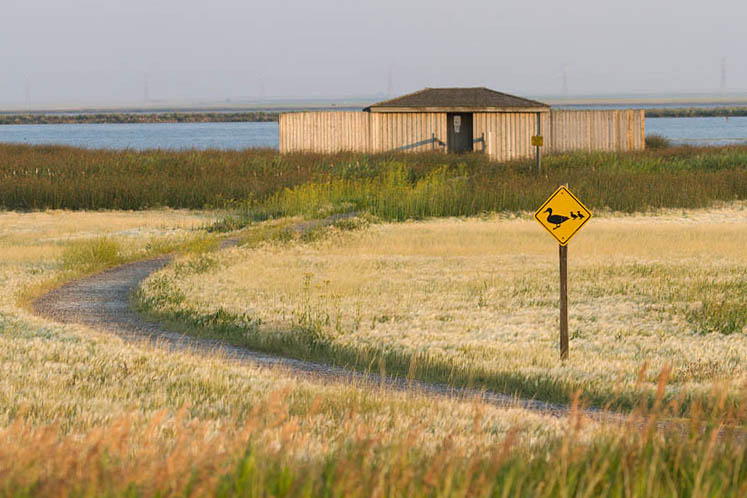
Frank Lake (South) IBA, Alberta, Canada.

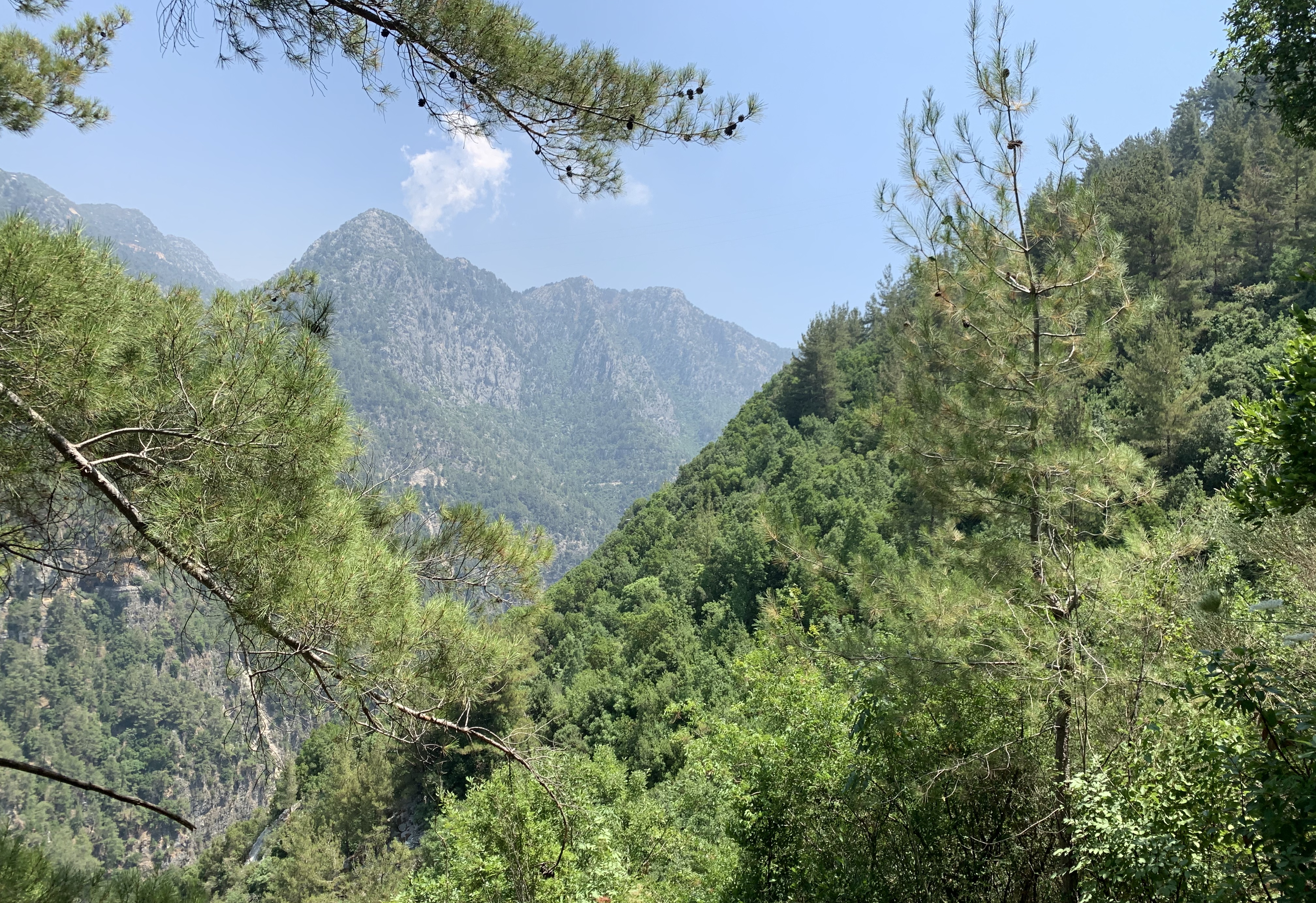
Jabal Moussa Biosphere Reserve in Lebanon

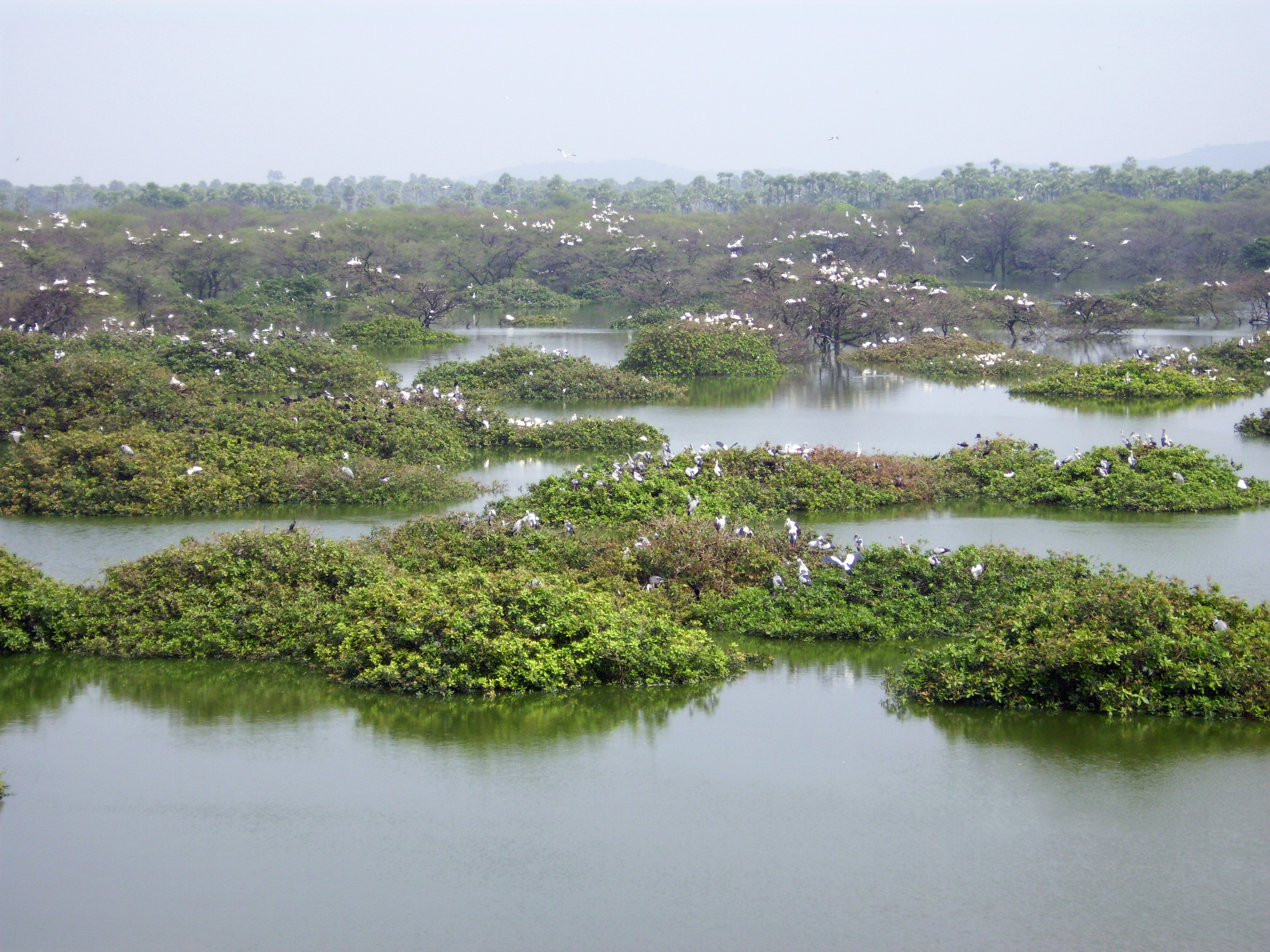
Vedanthangal Bird Sanctuary, Tamil Nadu, India.

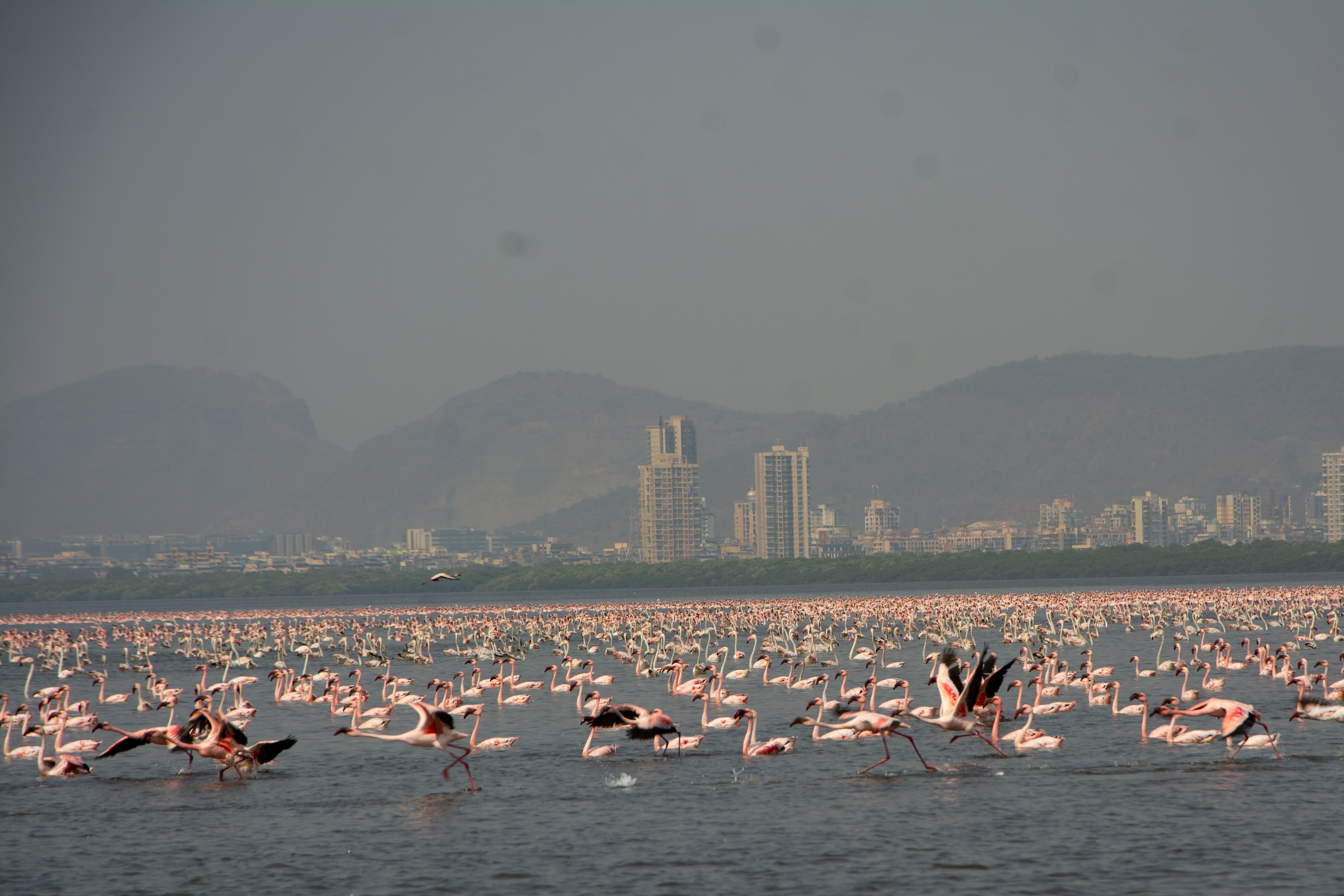
Thane Creek Flamingo Sanctuary, Maharashtra, India.

== History ==
In 1985, following a specific request from the European Economic Community, Birdlife International drew up a list of sites to be protected as a matter of priority. In 1989, a repertoire of IBAs of Europe was released.

At first the official name of this type of site was Important Bird Area, hence the acronym IBA, then at the BirdLife World Congress held in Canada in 2014 it was decided to adopt the name Important Bird and Biodiversity Area, without changing the acronym.

== Criteria ==
IBAs are determined by an internationally agreed set of criteria. Specific IBA thresholds are set by regional and national governing organizations. To be listed as an IBA, a site must satisfy at least one of the following rating criteria:

A1. Globally threatened species
The site qualifies if it is known, estimated or thought to hold a population of a species categorized by the IUCN Red List as Critically Endangered, Endangered or Vulnerable. In general, the regular presence of a Critical or Endangered species, irrespective of population size, at a site may be sufficient for a site to qualify as an IBA. For Vulnerable species, the presence of more than threshold numbers at a site is necessary to trigger selection.
A2. Restricted-range species
The site forms one of a set selected to ensure that all restricted-range species of an Endemic Bird Area (EBA) or a Secondary Area (SA) are present in significant numbers in at least one site and preferably more.
A3. Biome-restricted species
The site forms one of a set selected to ensure adequate representation of all species restricted to a given biome, both across the biome as a whole and for all of its species in each range state.
A4. Congregations
i. This applies to 'waterbird' species as defined by Delaney and Scott and is modelled on criterion 6 of the Ramsar Convention for identifying wetlands of international importance. Depending upon how species are distributed, the 1% thresholds for the biogeographic populations may be taken directly from Delaney & Scott, they may be generated by combining flyway populations within a biogeographic region or, for those for which no quantitative thresholds are given, they are determined regionally or inter-regionally, as appropriate, using the best available information.
ii. This includes those seabird species not covered by Delaney and Scott (2002). Quantitative data are taken from a variety of published and unpublished sources.
iii. This is modeled on criterion 5 of the Ramsar Convention for identifying wetlands of international importance. The use of this criterion is discouraged where quantitative data are good enough to permit the application of A4i and A4ii.
iv. The site is known or thought to exceed thresholds set for migratory species at bottleneck sites.

The assessment by expert individuals is however not entirely reliable and a study in South America found that the coverage needed for at-risk bird conservation as chosen by computational algorithms rarely overlapped with IBAs and suggested that such methods should be used to complement expert driven IBA site choices.

== See also ==
- Biodiversity
- Biodiversity hotspot
- Important Plant Areas
- Key Biodiversity Areas
- Protected areas
