= Markham Bay (Antarctica) =

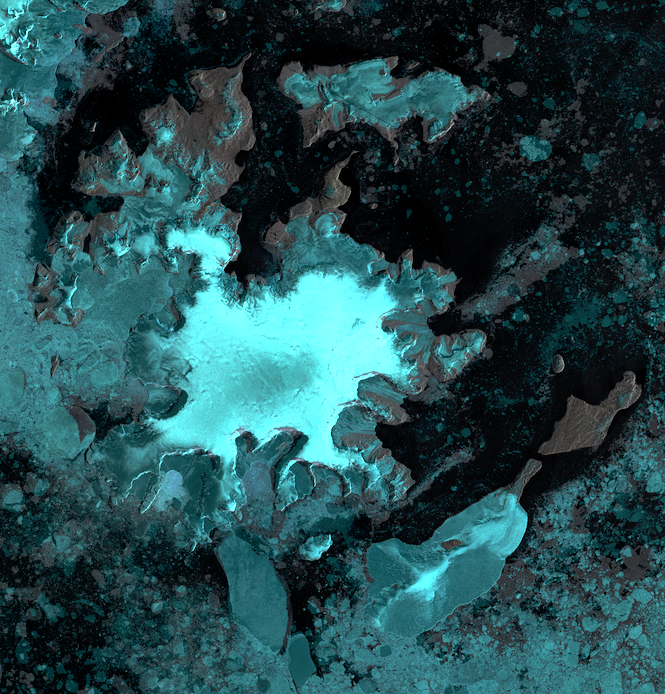
- James Ross Island. Markham Bay in southeast

- Location within Antarctica
- Coordinates: 64°17′S 57°18′W
- Type: Bay

Markham Bay (64°17′S 57°18′W) is a bay 8 nautical miles (15 km; 9.2 mi) wide, lying between Ekelöf Point and Hamilton Point on the east side of James Ross Island, Antarctica.

== Location ==
Trinity Peninsula on Antarctic Peninsula. James Ross Island east of the tip

Markham Bay indents the southeast shore of James Ross Island, which lies to the southwest of Trinity Peninsula, at the tip of the Antarctic Peninsula in Graham Land. It faces Snow Hill Island and Seymour Island to the southeast. It is below Mount Haddington to the northwest.

== Exploration and name ==
Markham Bay was possibly first seen by a British expedition under James Clark Ross, who explored this area in 1842–43. It was first charted by the Swedish Antarctic Expedition (SwedAE), 1901–04, under Otto Nordenskjöld, who named it for Sir Clements Markham.

== Features ==
=== Ekelöf Point ===
64°14′S 57°12′W. A high rocky point which lies 5 nautical miles (9.3 km; 5.8 mi) southwest of Cape Gage and marks the north side of the entrance to Markham Bay. First seen and surveyed by the SwedAE under Otto Nordenskjöld, 1901-04, who named it Kap Ekelöf after Doctor Eric kelöf, medical officer of the expedition. Resurveyed by the Falkland Islands Dependencies Survey (FIDS) in 1953. Point is considered a more suitable descriptive term for this feature than cape.

=== Saint Rita Point ===
64°15′S 57°16′W. A point terminating in a steep rock outcrop immediately north of the mouth of Gourdon Glacier. The name "Cabo Santa Rita" appears on a 1959 Argentine map. Saint Rita of Cascia (1381-1457), an Italian, was canonized in 1900 and is well known throughout the Spanish-speaking world as the saint of desperate causes.

=== Gourdon Glacier ===
64°15′S 57°22′W. A glacier 4 nautical miles (7.4 km; 4.6 mi) long, flowing southeast into Markham Bay between Saint Rita Point and Rabot Point. It has a conspicuous rock wall at its head. First surveyed by the SwedAE under Otto Nordenskjöld, 1901-04, who named it for Ernest Gourdon, geologist and glaciologist of the French Antarctic Expedition, 1903-05.

=== Rabot Point ===
64°17′S 57°20′W. A high rocky point in Markham Bay that separates the mouths of Gourdon Glacier and Hobbs Glacier. The name "Rabot Gletscher" after the French glaciologist, Charles Rabot, was originally given by Otto Nordenskjold, leader of the SwedAE, 1901-04, to a small glacier close west of The Watchtower on the south side of the island. The FIDS surveyed the south part of the island in 1953 and found that the glacier is very insignificant and does not require a name. In order to preserve the name Rabot in the vicinity, the UK-APC has applied it to the point described.

=== Hobbs Glacier ===
64°18′S 57°26′W. A glacier situated in a steep, rock-walled cirque at the northwest side of Hamilton Point, and flowing southeast into the south part of Markham Bay. First seen and surveyed by SwedAE, 1901-04, under Otto Nordenskjöld, who named it for Professor William H. Hobbs (1864-1953), American geologist and glaciologist.

=== Redshaw Point ===
64.3166667°S 57.3666667°W. An ice-free point facing Markham Bay, situated between Hobbs Glacier and Ball Glacier. Named by UK Antarctic Place-names Committee (UK-APC) in 1995 after Susan Margaret Redshaw (b. 1954), British Antarctic Survey (BAS) General Field Assistant at James Ross Island, 1990-91; Rothera Station, 1992-93; from 1994-95, a member of the British Antarctic Survey (BAS) field party in the Jame Ross Island area.

=== Ball Glacier ===
64.3333333°S 57.3666667°W. A small glacier separating Redshaw Point from Hamilton Point, flowing northeast to Markham Bay on the southeast side of James Ross Island. Named by UK Antarctic Place-names Committee (UK-APC) in 1995 after H. William Ball (b. 1926), Keeper of Paleontology, British Museum (Natural History), 1966-86, and author of Falklands Islands Dependencies Survey (FIDS) Scientific Report No. 24 on fossils from the James Ross Island area.

=== Hamilton Point ===
64°22′S 57°18′W. A flat-topped point marking the south side of the entrance to Markham Bay. Discovered by a British expedition under James Clark Ross, 1839-43, who named it Cape Hamilton after Captain William Baillie-Hamilton, Royal Navy, then private secretary to the Earl of Haddington, and later Second Secretary to the Admiralty. First surveyed by the SwedAE under Otto Nordenskjöld, 1901-04, and resurveyed by the FIDS in 1953. Point is considered a more suitable descriptive term for the feature than cape.

== Sources ==
- Alberts, Fred G., ed. (1995), Geographic Names of the Antarctic (PDF) (2 ed.), United States Board on Geographic Names This article incorporates public domain material from websites or documents of the United States Board on Geographic Names.
- "Ball Glacier", Geographic Names Information System, United States Geological Survey, United States Department of the Interior
- Graham Land and South Shetland Islands, BAS: British Antarctic Survey, 2005
- "Redshaw Point", Geographic Names Information System, United States Geological Survey, United States Department of the Interior

This article incorporates public domain material from websites or documents of the United States Geological Survey.
