= Snow Hill Island =

Island of Antarctica

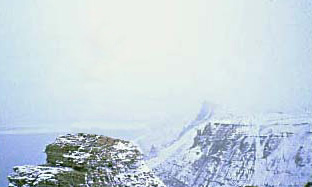
- Snow Hill Island, January 1999

- Location of Snow Hill Island

- Location in Antarctica Snow Hill Island (Antarctica)

Geography
- Location: Antarctica
- Coordinates: 64°28′S 57°12′W
- Archipelago: James Ross Island group
- Length: 33 km (20.5 mi)
- Width: 12 km (7.5 mi)

Administration
- Administered under the Antarctic Treaty System

Demographics
- Population: uninhabited

Snow Hill Island is an almost completely snowcapped island, 33 km (21 mi) long and 12 km (7.5 mi) wide, lying off the east coast of the Antarctic Peninsula. It is separated from James Ross Island to the north-east by Admiralty Sound and from Seymour Island to the north by Picnic Passage. It is one of several islands around the peninsula known as Graham Land, which is closer to Chile, Argentina and South America than any other part of the Antarctic continent.

== History ==
The island was discovered on 6 January 1843 by a British expedition under James Clark Ross who, uncertain of its connection with the mainland, named it Snow Hill because its snow cover stood out in contrast to the bare ground of nearby Seymour Island. Its insular character was determined in 1902 by the Swedish Antarctic Expedition in the ship Antarctic, under Otto Nordenskjöld, who spent the winters of 1901, 1902, and 1903 there, using it as a base to explore the neighbouring islands and the Nordenskjold Coast of the Antarctic Peninsula. The American artist Frank Wilbur Stokes, who was aboard the Antarctic, collected fossils from Snow Hill Island. After returning to the United States in 1903, those fossils were described by the palaeontologist Stuart Weller. They include bivalves, gastropods, ammonites, and a lobster. The lobster, Hoploparia stokesi, was the first arthropod described from Antarctica.

=== Historic site ===
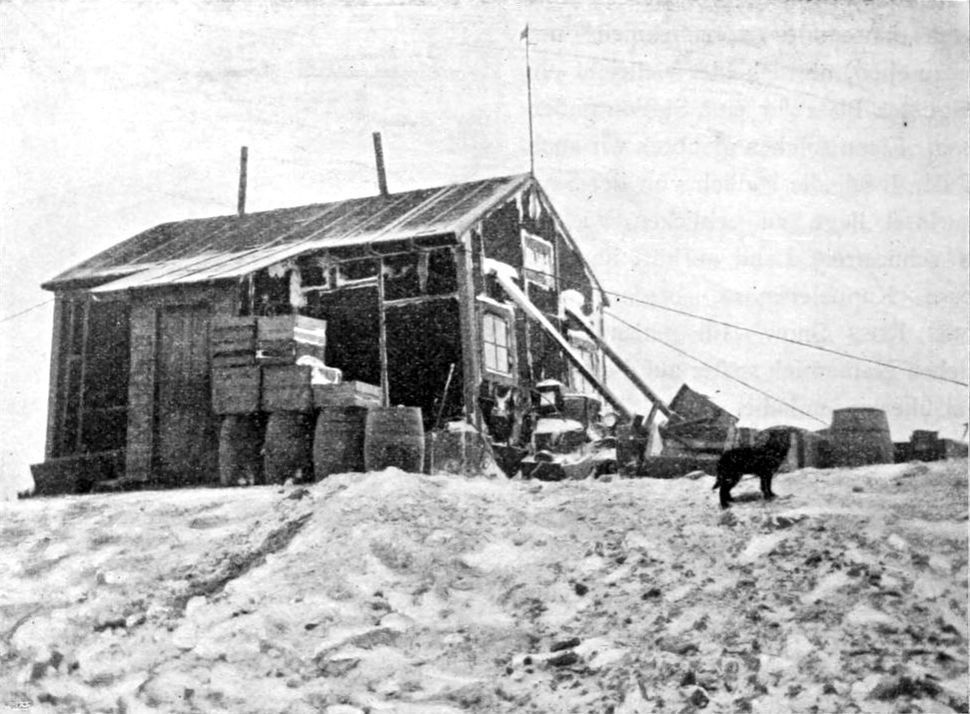
Nordenskjöld House, 1902 photograph

The wooden hut built by the main party of the Swedish Expedition in February 1902, also known as Nordenskjöld House, has been designated a Historic Site or Monument (HSM 38), following a proposal by Argentina and the United Kingdom to the Antarctic Treaty Consultative Meeting.

== Geography ==
Ice-free Spath Peninsula, 4.0 mi (6.5 km) long, forms the island's northeast extremity. The northernmost point of Snow Hill Island is Cape Lázara. The cape was named "Cabo Costa Lázara" by the command of the Argentine ship Chiriguano of the Argentine Antarctic Expedition, 1953–54, after Teniente (lieutenant) Costa Lázara, an Argentine navy pilot who was killed in a flying accident at the Espora Naval Air Base.

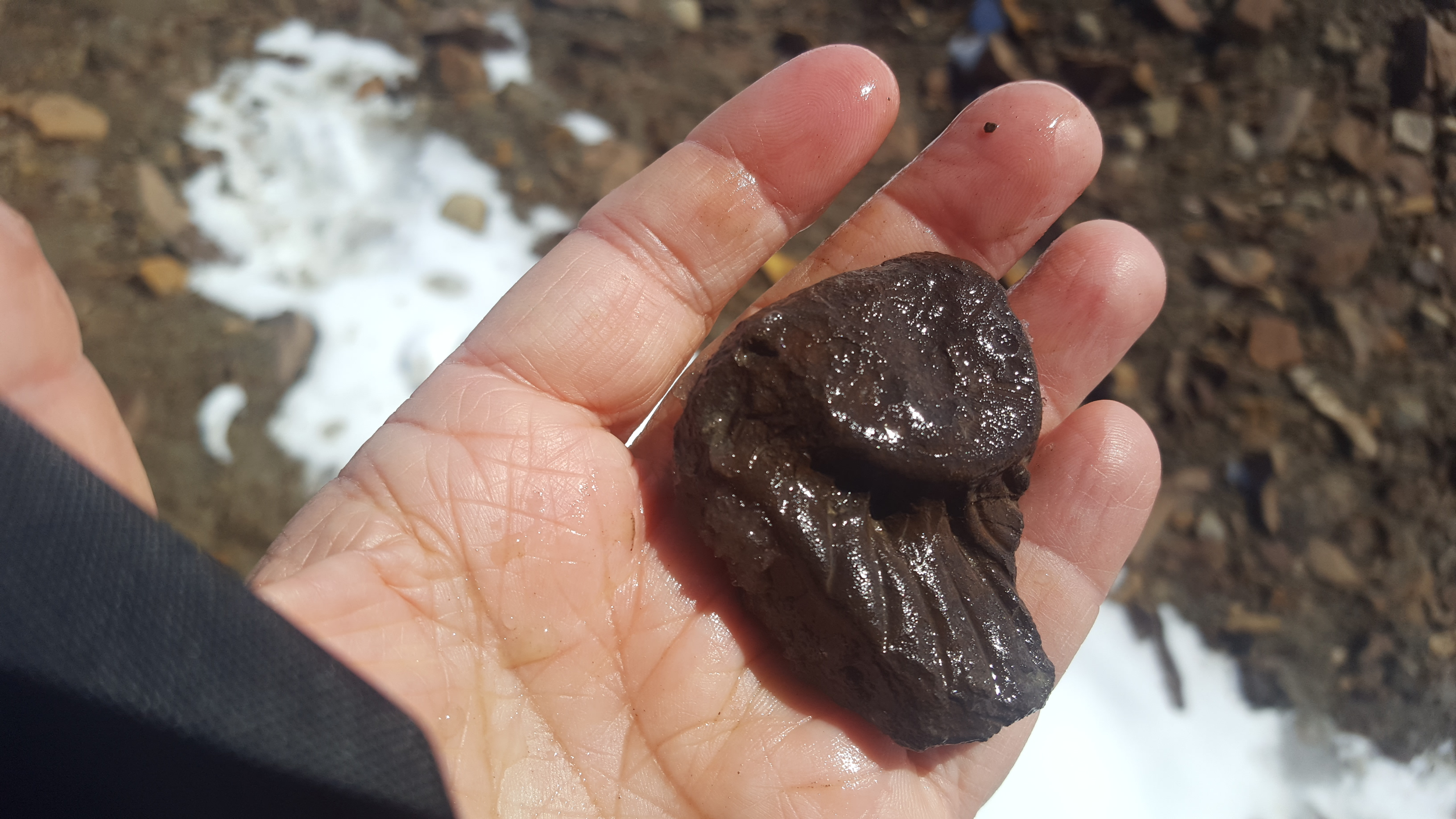
Partial ammonite

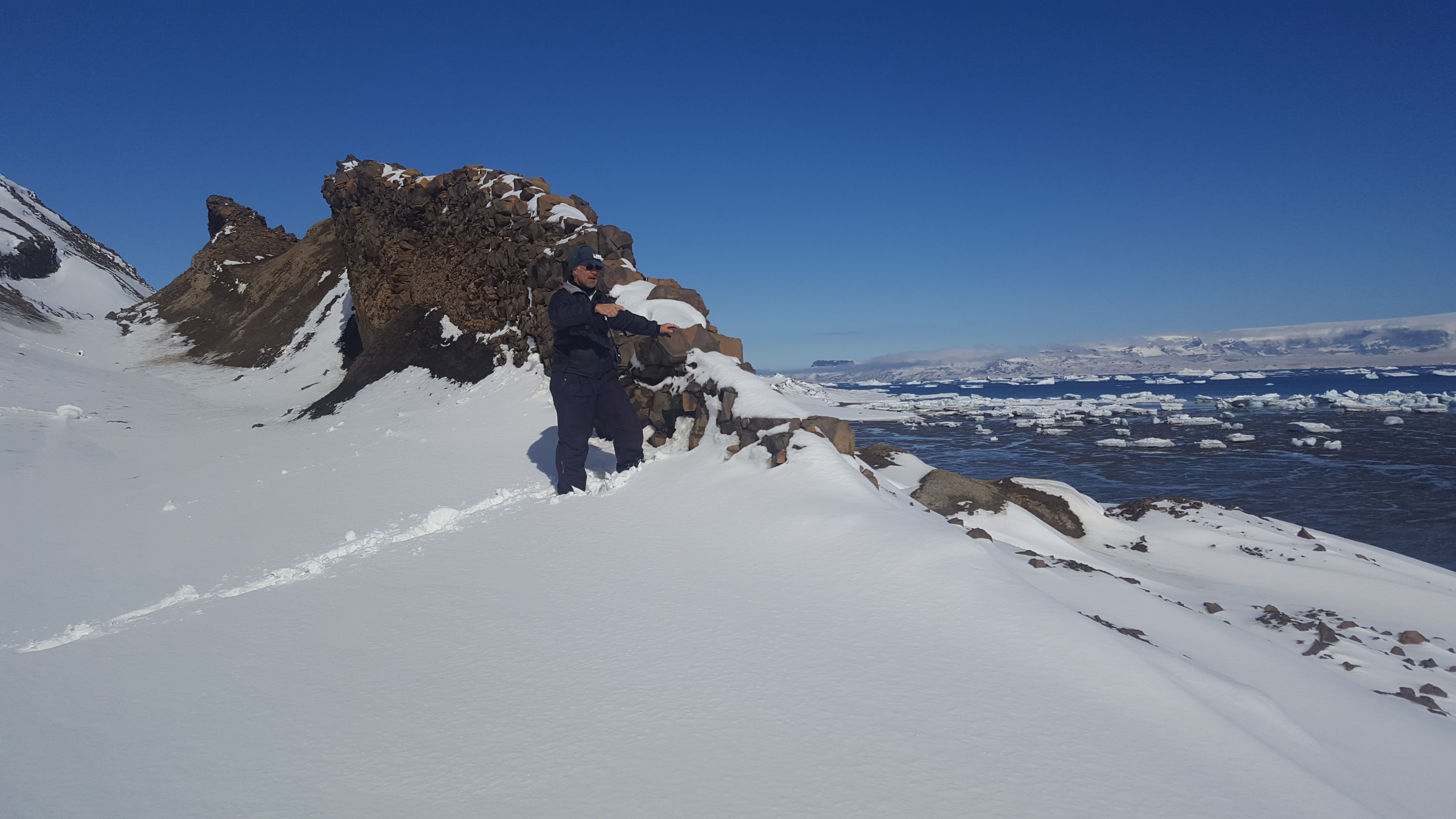
Basalt dike

Haslum Crag is a prominent rock crag close to the island's north coast. It stands 2 nautical miles (4 km) northeast of ice-free Station Nunatak, which rises 150 m (490 ft) tall. They were first seen by members of the Swedish Antarctic Expedition (SAE), 1901–04, under Otto Nordenskiöld, and surveyed by the Falkland Islands Dependencies Survey in 1952. Nordenskiöld named Station Nunatak because of its proximity to the expedition's winter station, and he gave Haslum Crag its original name, "Basaltspitze". Concerned that "Basaltspitze" could be mistaken for descriptive information, the United Kingdom Antarctic Place-Names Committee changed it to Haslum Crag, honoring H.J. Haslum, second mate on the Antarctic, the ship of the Swedish expedition. This area of the northeast coast consists of Cretaceous sedimentary rocks with abundant fossils of ammonites, gastropods, and bivalves. There are numerous basalt dikes that project up through the sedimentary rocks near the station Nunatak.

Day Nunatak and Dingle Nunatak appear within the main ice cap of the island. Both were named by the UK Antarctic Place-Names Committee in 1995. Day Nunatak was named for Crispin Mark Jeremy Day, a long-serving British Antarctic Survey (BAS) General Field Assistant. He was at Rothera Station, 1986–89, 1991–92, 1993–94; and was a member of the BAS field party in the James Ross Island area from 1994 to 1995. Dingle Nunatak was named after Richard Vernon Dingle, Senior BAS geologist, and a member of the BAS field party in the James Ross Island area from 1994 to 1995.

Sanctuary Cliffs is a rock cliffs at the north edge of the island's central ice cap. It was first surveyed by the SAE, which named them "Mittelnunatak", presumably because of their position near the middle of the north coast of the island. Following survey by FIDS in 1952, it was reported that the term "cliffs" was more suitable than "nunatak" for this feature. UK-APC recommended an entirely new and more distinctive name be approved, and it was dubbed Sanctuary Cliffs in recognition of the way the cliffs provide shelter from the prevailing southwesterly winds.

== Important Bird Area ==
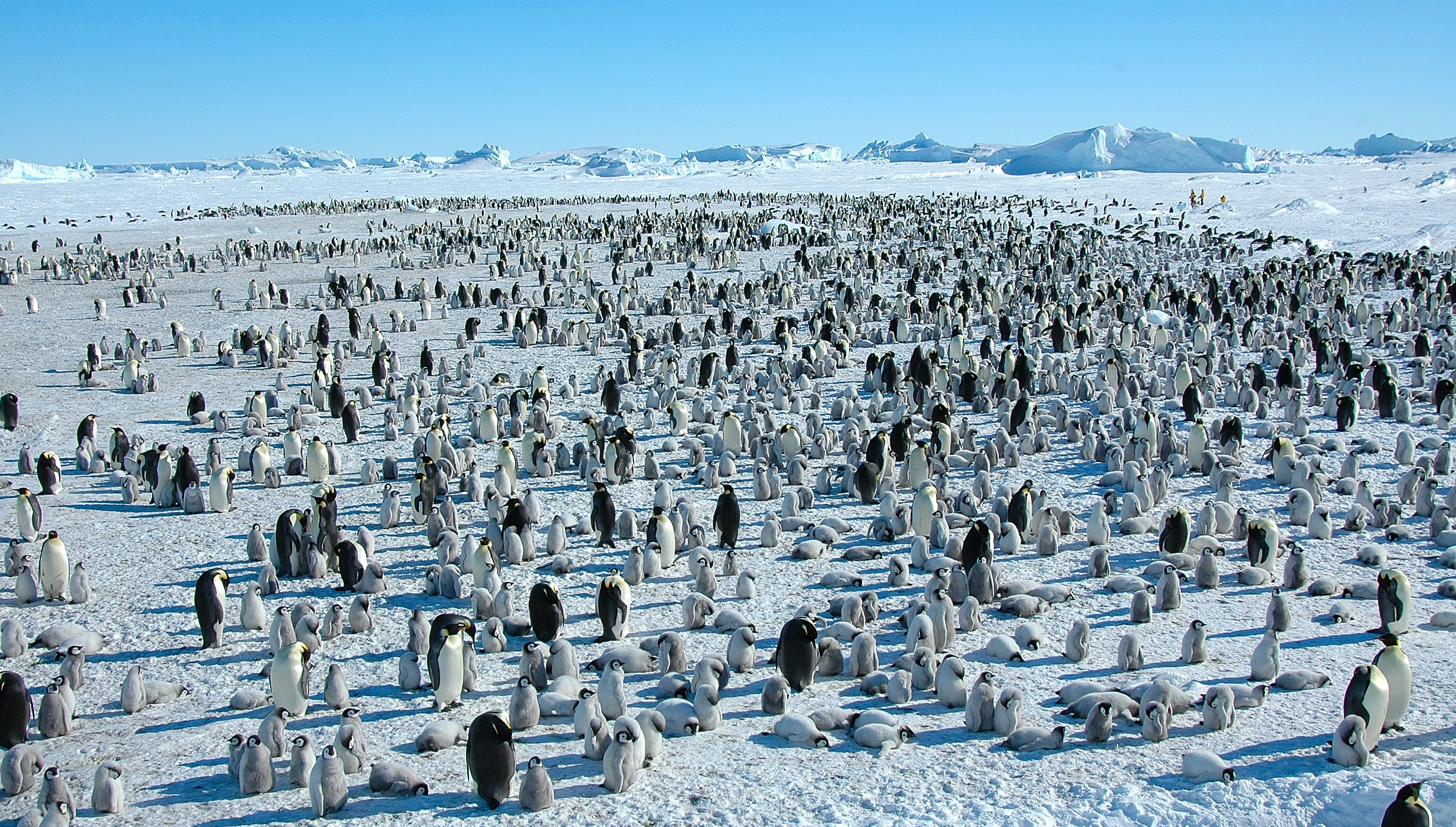
Snow Hill Island's colony of Emperor penguins, photographed in 2007

A site at the south-western extremity of the island, comprising 263 ha of sea ice adjacent to the coast, has been identified as an Important Bird Area (IBA) by BirdLife International because it supports a breeding colony of about 4000 pairs of emperor penguins. It is one of only two such colonies on land in the Antarctic Peninsula region, the other being that at the Dion Islands which is now no longer existent. This colony is also unique in terms of its breeding cycle compared to more southern breeding sites. In winter, incubating males don't experience the darkness of the sky as more southerly populations. Because the ice on which the colony stands is affected by the sun later in the year than in other colonies, the development of the emperor chicks is slightly delayed. This gives the chicks in Snow Hill more time to grow their first waterproof plumage before they head to the sea unlike in other populations, whose chicks arrive to the sea mostly covered in down to a point where they cannot swim yet. This developmental delay also gives tourists an opportunity to visit the colony while the chicks are still under the care of the adults.

== See also ==
- Snow Hill Island Formation
- List of Antarctic and subantarctic islands
