= Croft Bay =

Bay on the Antarctic Peninsula

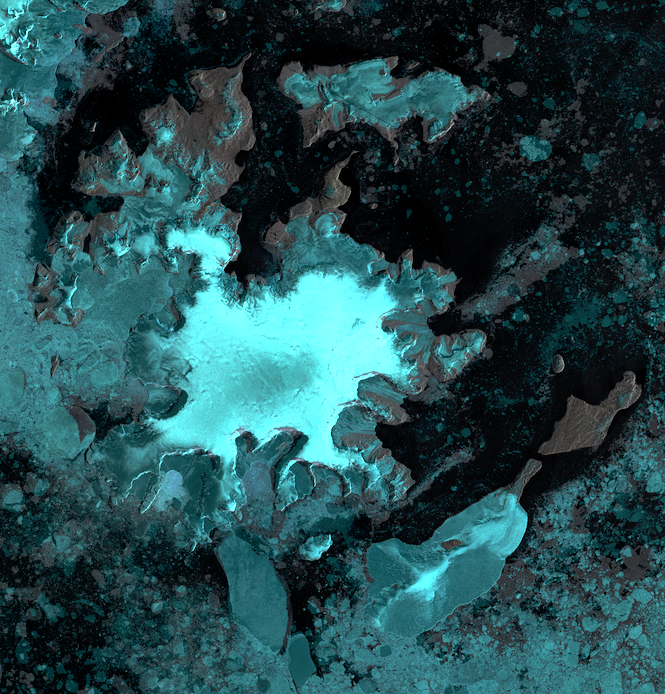
- James Ross Island. Croft Bay in the north center, extending deep into the island

- Location within Antarctica
- Coordinates: 64°0′S 57°45′W
- Type: Bay

Croft Bay (64°0′S 57°45′W) is a bay which indents the north-central side of James Ross Island and forms the southern part of Herbert Sound, south of the northeastern end of the Antarctic Peninsula.

== Location ==
Trinity Peninsula on Antarctic Peninsula. James Ross Island east of the tip

Croft Bay deeply indents the north shore of James Ross Island, which lies to the southwest of Trinity Peninsula, at the tip of the Antarctic Peninsula in Graham Land. The bay opens into Herbert Sound, to the north, which separates in from Vega Island. The Ulu Peninsula defines its west margin.

== Exploration and name ==
Croft Bay was discovered in 1903 by the Swedish Antarctic Expedition under Otto Nordenskiöld. It was charted in 1945 by the Falkland Islands Dependencies Survey (FIDS), who named it for William Noble Croft, a FIDS geologist at Hope Bay in 1946.

== Features ==
=== Blancmange Hill ===
64°00′S 57°40′W. An outstanding ice-free coastal landmark located 3 nautical miles (5.6 km; 3.5 mi) northeast of Stark Point on the east side of Croft Bay. Named by the UK Antarctic Place-Names Committee (UK-APC) following FIDS surveys taken 1958–1961. The name is descriptive since the feature resembles a blancmange.

=== Stark Point ===
64°02′S 57°44′W. A rocky point on the east side of Croft Bay. It is formed by almost vertical cliffs which rise from the sea to 285 metres (935 ft). Surveyed by FIDS in August 1953. The descriptive name was applied by UK-APC.

=== Dreadnought Point ===
64°00′S 57°48′W. A prominent rocky point on the west side of Croft Bay. Surveyed by FIDS in August 1953. The UK-APC name is descriptive; the appearance of the feature is reminiscent of the bows of the early ironclads (battleships).

=== Saint Martha Cove ===
63°56′S 57°50′W. A small, almost landlocked cove on the northwest side of Croft Bay, close south of Andreassen Point. Named on an Argentine map of 1959, presumably after Saint Martha, sister of Mary and Lazarus.

=== Andreassen Point ===
63°54′S 57°46′W. A low ice-free point in northern James Ross Island, fronting on Herbert Sound, 8 nautical miles (15 km; 9.2 mi) south of Cape Lachman. Probably first seen by Otto Nordenskiöld in 1903. Surveyed by FIDS in 1945. Named by UK-APC for F.L. Andreassen, first mate on the Antarctic, the ship of the SwedAE, 1901–1904.

== Sources ==
- Alberts, Fred G., ed. (1995), Geographic Names of the Antarctic (PDF) (2 ed.), United States Board on Geographic Names This article incorporates public domain material from websites or documents of the United States Board on Geographic Names.
- Graham Land and South Shetland Islands, BAS: British Antarctic Survey, 2005

This article incorporates public domain material from websites or documents of the United States Geological Survey.
