= Comminution dating =

Radiometric dating technique based on the disequilibrium between uranium isotopes

Comminution dating is a developing radiometric dating technique based on the disequilibrium between uranium isotopes in fine-grained sediments.

== Theory ==
An alpha-particle with a finite energy is emitted during the alpha decay of uranium-238 to uranium-234 via the short-lived thorium-234. In order to conserve momentum, the daughter nuclide, uranium-234, is recoiled. In silicate mineral grains with high surface-area-to-volume ratios, a certain fraction of nuclides may be directly ejected into the surrounding medium (water or air).

== Applications ==
Comminution dating has been applied to dating of:

- Ice cores.
- Palaeochannel deposits.
- Alluvial fans.

== Developments ==
In order to calculate reliable comminution ages, authigenic uranium must be removed from the surface and pores of silicate minerals. used an etching procedure to evaluate the completeness of existing sample pre-treatment procedures. It was found that further chemical pre-treatment steps are required to completely remove authigenic uranium from sediments. Further work is required to test this approach of samples from different depositional environments.
