= Mount Haddington =

Mountain in Graham Land, Antarctica

- Location within Antarctica

Highest point
- Elevation: 1,630 m (5,350 ft)
- Prominence: 1,630 m (5,350 ft)
- Listing: Ultra, Ribu
- Coordinates: 64°13′S 57°38′W

Geography
- Location: James Ross Island, Antarctica

Geology
- Mountain type: Shield volcano
- Volcanic field: James Ross Island Volcanic Group
- Last eruption: Unknown

Mount Haddington is a massive 1,630 m (5,350 ft) high shield volcano comprising much of James Ross Island in Graham Land, Antarctica. It is 60 km (37 mi) wide and has had numerous subglacial eruptions throughout its history, forming many tuyas. Some of its single eruptions were bigger in volume than a whole normal-sized volcano. Old eruption shorelines are widespread on the volcano's deeply eroded flanks.

Haddington formed along the Larsen Rift dominantly during the Miocene and Pliocene epochs but more recent eruptions have produced tuff cones on its slopes. The youngest tuff cones and pyroclastic cones on the eastern slope are situated below the summit icecap and may have formed in the last few thousand years. Effusive eruptions have created large deltas composed of hyaloclastite breccia and lava flows.

Mount Haddington was discovered on December 31, 1842, by the Ross expedition, a voyage of scientific exploration of the Antarctic from 1839 to 1843 led by James Clark Ross. Ross named the mountain after the Earl of Haddington, then First Lord of the Admiralty.

== See also ==
- List of ultras of Antarctica
- List of volcanoes in Antarctica
