= James Ross Island =

Island off the Antarctic Peninsula

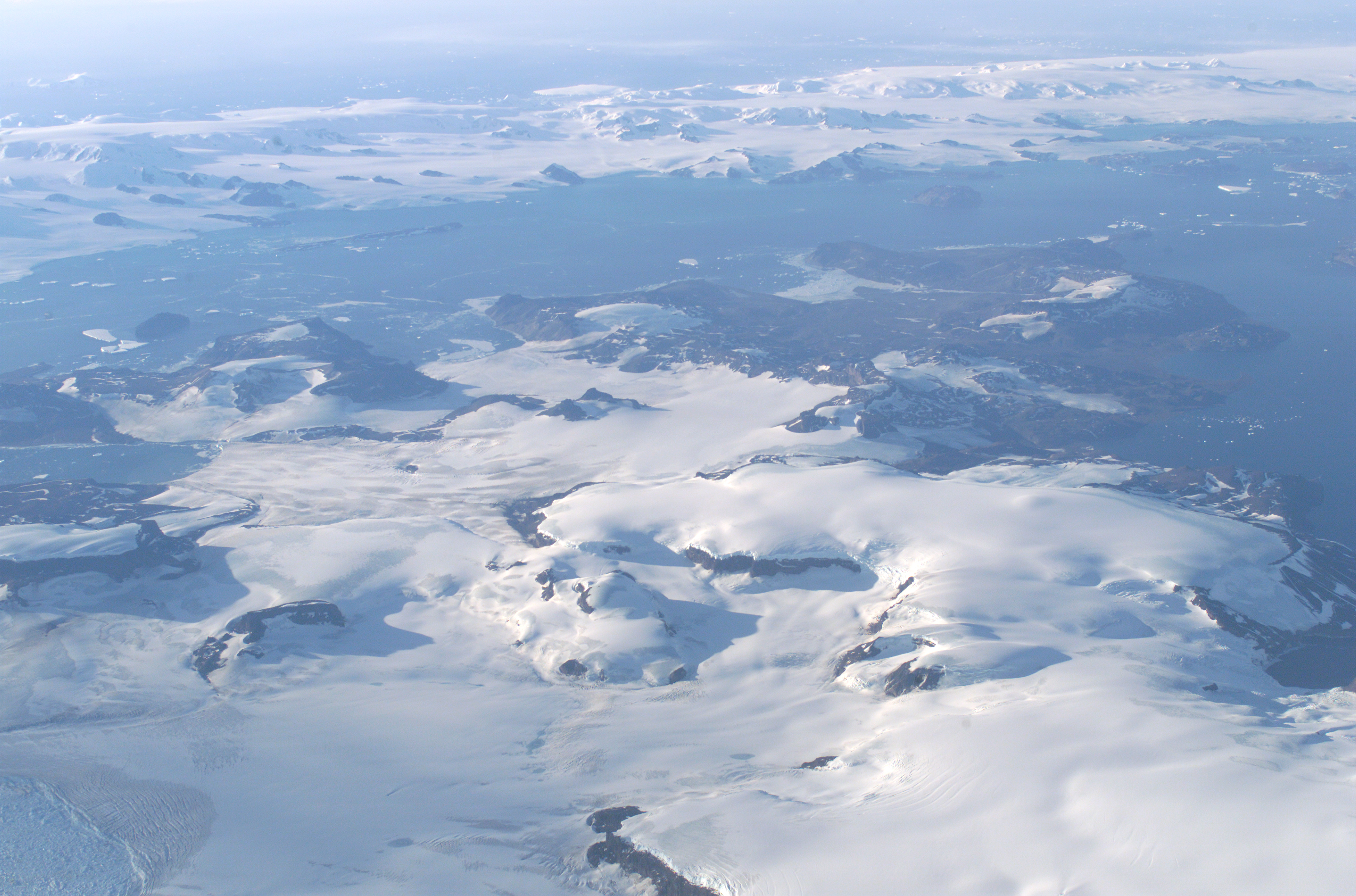
- James Ross Island from NASA's DC-8 aircraft during an AirSAR March 2004 mission over the Antarctic Peninsula

- Location of James Ross Island

- Location in Antarctica

Geography
- Location: Antarctica
- Coordinates: 64°10′S 57°45′W
- Archipelago: James Ross Island group
- Area: 2,598 km^{2} (1,003 sq mi)
- Length: 64 km (39.8 mi)
- Highest elevation: 1,630 m (5350 ft)
- Highest point: Mount Haddington

James Ross Island is a large island off the southeast side and near the northeastern extremity of the Antarctic Peninsula, from which it is separated by Prince Gustav Channel. Rising to 1,630 metres (5,350 ft), it is irregularly shaped and extends 40 nautical miles (74 km; 46 mi) in a north–south direction.

== Location ==
Trinity Peninsula on Antarctic Peninsula. James Ross Island east of the tip

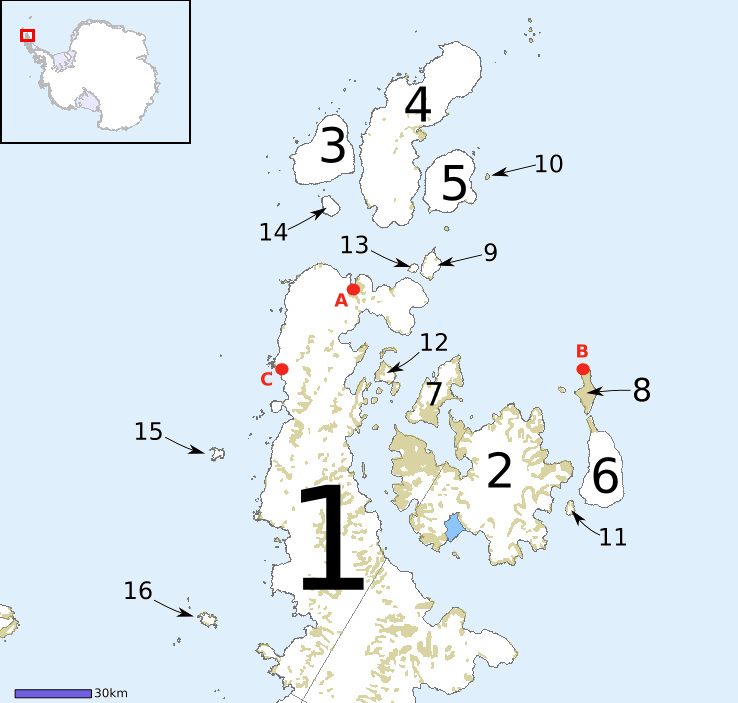
Tip of Graham Land, showing James Ross Island (2)

James Ross Island is separated from Trinity Peninsula, at the tip of the Antarctic Peninsula to the northwest, by the Prince Gustav Channel. Vega Island is to the north of the island, separated from James Ross Island by the Herbert Sound. Erebus and Terror Gulf is to the northeast. Seymour Island and Snow Hill Island are to the southeast. It is in the James Ross Island group.

The island was connected to the Antarctic mainland by an ice shelf until 1995, when the ice shelf collapsed, making the Prince Gustav Channel passable for the first time.

Mendel Polar Station, the first Czech Antarctic Base, is located on the island.

== Exploration and name ==
James Ross Island was charted in October 1903 by the Swedish Antarctic Expedition (SwedAE) under Otto Nordenskiöld, who named it for Sir James Clark Ross, the leader of a British expedition to this area in 1842 that discovered and roughly charted a number of points along the eastern side of the island. The style, "James" Ross Island is used to avoid confusion with the more widely known Ross Island in McMurdo Sound.

== Paleontology ==
Two dinosaur-bearing formations are present on the island, both from the Upper Cretaceous: the Santa Marta Formation and the Snow Hill Island Formation. These are two of only three known formations to have dinosaur fossils in Antarctica.

The first dinosaur discovered in Antarctica was Antarctopelta oliveroi, a medium-sized ankylosaur found on James Ross Island by Argentinian geologists Eduardo Olivero and Roberto Scasso in 1986. The dinosaur was recovered from the Campanian stage of the Upper Cretaceous Santa Marta Formation, about 2 km (1.2 mi) south of Santa Marta Cove on the north part of the island. The ankylosaur was not formally named until 2006.

In December 2003, U.S. paleontologist Judd Case from Saint Mary's College of California and U.S. geologist James Martin from the South Dakota School of Mines & Technology discovered the bones of a theropod dinosaur on the island. Nicknamed "Naze" after the northerly Naze Peninsula on which it was found, the Late Cretaceous remains include an upper jaw and teeth, and most of the lower legs and feet. Little information is available, but the shape of the leg and feet indicate it was a runner. In 2019, it was given the name Imperobator antarcticus. It was large, about the size of Utahraptor. It is the second Antarctic theropod discovered, after Cryolophosaurus.

An ornithopod was found in the Snow Hill Island Formation by Argentine paleontologists Rodolfo Aníbal Coria and Juan José Moly in 2008. In 2013, Coria named it Trinisaura santamartaensis.

In 2015, an iguanodontid found in 2002 by Fernando Novas was named Morrosaurus antarcticus by Sebastian Rozadilla, Federico Lisandro Agnolin, Fernando Emilio Novas, Alexis Rolando Aranciaga Mauro, Matthew J. Motta, Juan Manuel Lirio Marcelo and Pablo Isasi. The genus name refers to the site of El Morro on James Ross Island, where the remains of the species were found. The specific name refers to Antarctica.

== Notable features ==
Notable features, clockwise from the west, include:

- Ulu Peninsula (63°56′S 58°5′W) is that portion of James Ross Island northwest of the narrow neck of land between Rohss Bay and Croft Bay, extending from Cape Obelisk to Cape Lachman.
- Croft Bay (64°0′S 57°45′W) is a bay which indents the north-central side of James Ross Island and forms the southern part of Herbert Sound.
- The Naze (63°57′S 57°32′W) is a peninsula in north James Ross Island, marking the southeast entrance to Herbert Sound and extending about 5 nautical miles (9.3 km; 5.8 mi) northeast from Terrapin Hill toward the south-central shore of Vega Island.
- Markham Bay (64°17′S 57°18′W) is a bay 8 nautical miles (15 km; 9.2 mi) wide, lying between Ekelöf Point and Hamilton Point on the east side of James Ross Island.
- Mount Haddington (64°13′S 57°38′W is a mountain, 1,630 metres (5,350 ft) high, surmounting the central part of James Ross Island.
- Röhss Bay (64°12′S 58°16′W) is a bay 11 nautical miles (20 km; 13 mi) wide, between Cape Broms and Cape Obelisk on the southwest side of James Ross Island.

== Northeast features ==
From west to east

=== Flett Buttress ===
64°07′S 57°49′W. A rock crag rising to 905 metres (2,969 ft) high northwest of Mount Haddington. It provides the highest exposure of volcanic rock on the island. Named by the UK Antarctic Place-Names Committee (UK-APC) in 1987 after William R. Flett, geologist on Operation Tabarin at Deception Island (Base Leader), 1943–44, and Hope Bay, 1944–45.

=== Förster Cliffs ===
64°01′S 57°33′W. Cliffs located east-northeast of Stark Point, running east–west for 2 nautical miles (3.7 km; 2.3 mi) and rising to 550 metres (1,800 ft) high in northern James Ross Island. Named by the UK-APC in 1987 after Reinhard Förster (1935–87), West German geologist from LMU Munich, who was a member of the British Antarctic Survey (BAS) field party to the area, 1985–86.

=== Skep Point ===
64°03′S 57°18′W. A high ice-free point 5 nautical miles (9.3 km; 5.8 mi) west-northwest of Ula Point on the northeast coast of James Ross Island. Surveyed by Falkland Islands Dependencies Survey (FIDS) first in 1945, then again in 1953. The UK-APC name is descriptive; when viewed from seaward the feature resembles a skep type beehive.

=== Ula Point ===
64°05′S 57°09′W. A low ice-covered point on the northeast coast of James Ross Island, 5 nautical miles (9.3 km; 5.8 mi) northwest of Cape Gage. First seen and roughly surveyed by SwedAE, 1901–04, under Otto Nordenskjold. Resurveyed by FIDS in 1945. Named by UK-APC for Anton Olsen Ula, boatswain on the Antarctic the ship of the above Swedish expedition.

=== Coley Glacier ===
69°09′S 57°14′W. A glacier, 5 nautical miles (9.3 km; 5.8 mi) long, on the east side of James Ross Island. It flows into Erebus and Terror Gulf just north of Cape Gage. Surveyed by FIDS in 1945 and 1953. Named by UK-APC for John A. Coley of FIDS, meteorological assistant at Hope Bay in 1952 and 1953.

=== Cape Gage ===
64°10′S 57°05′W. A rocky promontory forming the east extremity of James Ross Island and the west side of the north entrance to Admiralty Sound. Discovered by a British expedition 1839–43, under James Clark Ross, who named it for V. Admiral William Hall Gage, a Lord Commissioner of the Admiralty.

== Southeast features ==
From west to east

=== Nygren Point ===
64°23′S 58°13′W. A rocky point 4 nautical miles (7.4 km; 4.6 mi) southeast of Cape Broms, on the southwest side of James Ross Island. First seen and surveyed in 1903 by the SwedAE under Nordenskjold, who named it Cape Nygren after G. Nygren, Swedish chemist who contributed toward the cost of the expedition. It was resurveyed by the FIDS in 1952. Point is considered a more suitable descriptive term for this feature than cape.

=== Carlsson Bay ===
64°24′S 58°04′W. A square bay, 2.5 nautical miles (4.6 km; 2.9 mi) in extent, entered 3 nautical miles (5.6 km; 3.5 mi) northwest of Cape Foster on the southwest side of James Ross Island. First seen and surveyed in 1903 by the SwedAE under Nordenskjold, who named it for J. Carlsson of Sweden who contributed toward the cost of the expedition. The bay was resurveyed by the FIDS in 1952–53.

=== Tait Glacier ===
64°22′S 58°02′W. A glacier about 4 nautical miles (7.4 km; 4.6 mi) long on the southwest coast of James Ross Island, flowing southwest into Carlsson Bay. Probably first seen by Doctor Otto Nordenskjold in 1903. Surveyed by FIDS in 1945. Named by UK-APC for Murdo F. Tait, FIDS meteorological observer at Hope Bay in 1952 and 1953.

=== Cape Foster ===
64°27′S 57°59′W. A cape lying 2 nautical miles (3.7 km; 2.3 mi) southeast of Carlsson Bay on the south side of James Ross Island. Discovered by a British expedition 1839–43, under James Clark Ross, who named it for Captain Henry Foster, RN, leader of a British expedition in the Chanticleer, 1828–31. The cape was mapped by the SwedAE under Nordenskjold, 1901–04.

=== Sungold Hill ===
64°23′S 57°52′W. A prominent round hill 860 metres (2,820 ft) high with distinctive convex slopes, 2 nautical miles (3.7 km; 2.3 mi) inland between Cape Foster and Jefford Point. Named by UK-APC following FIDS surveys, 1958–61. The name records the characteristic color of the exposed rock cliffs.

=== Swift Bay ===
64.375°S 57.7702778°W A bay entered west of Jefford Point on the south side of James Ross Island. Named by UK Antarctic Place-names Committee (UK-APC) (2006) in association with Swift Glacier which flows southward into the bay.

=== Swift Glacier ===
64°22′S 57°46′W. A steep glacier about 2 nautical miles (3.7 km; 2.3 mi) long, close west of Jefford Point. Named by UK-APC following FIDS surveys, 1958–61. The name is descriptive, this being one of the most active glaciers on the island.

=== Jefford Point ===
64°24′S 57°41′W. A point formed by a rock cliff surmounted by ice, located 8 nautical miles (15 km; 9.2 mi) east-northeast of Cape Foster. First surveyed by SwedAE, 1901–04, under Otto Nordenskjold. Resurveyed by FIDS in 1948, the records being lost in a fire at Hope Bay, it was surveyed again by FIDS in 1952. Named by UK-APC for Brian Jefford, FIDS surveyor at Hope Bay in 1948, and at Admiralty Bay in 1949.

=== Lomas Ridge ===
64.3666667°S 57.5833333°W. A ridge, 3 kilometres (1.9 mi) long, trending north-northwest – south-southeast, midway between Jefford Point and Tortoise Hill, southeast James Ross Island. Named by UK Antarctic Place-names Committee (UK-APC) in 1995 after Simon Andrew Lomas (b. 1965), British Antarctic Survey (BAS) geologist who was a member of the British Antarctic Survey (BAS) field party in the area, 1994–95.

=== Tortoise Hill ===
64°22′S 57°30′W. A hill more than 500 metres (1,600 ft) high, 3 nautical miles (5.6 km; 3.5 mi) west of The Watchtower at the southeast corner of James Ross Island. Named by UK-APC following FIDS surveys, 1958–61. The feature is similar geologically and in appearance to Terrapin Hill in the northeast portion of the island; hence the application of a related name.

=== The Watchtower ===
64°23′S 57°22′W. An isolated, steep-sided, flat-topped rock mass, 400 metres (1,300 ft) high, on the southeast extremity of James Ross Island. First seen, roughly surveyed, and given the descriptive name "The Watch Tower" by Otto Nordenskjold of the SwedAE in March 1902.

=== Howarth Glacier ===
64.3833333°S 57.3833333°W. A small glacier flowing south-southeast to Admiralty Sound along the west side of The Watchtower. Named by UK-APC in 1995 after Michael Kingsley Howarth (b. 1932), Deputy Keeper of Paleontology, British Museum (Natural History), 1980–92, and author of Falklands Islands Dependencies Survey (FIDS) Scientific Report No. 21, Alexander Island.

== Sources ==
- Alberts, Fred G., ed. (1995), Geographic Names of the Antarctic (PDF) (2 ed.), United States Board on Geographic Names This article incorporates public domain material from websites or documents of the United States Board on Geographic Names.
- "A Lost World: Two Previously Unknown Dinosaurs Discovered in Antarctica". Maryland VIP K-16 Grant. Science Inquiry. 2007. Archived from the original on 29 September 2007.
- Coria, R. A.; Moly, J. J.; Reguero, M.; Santillana, S.; Marenssi, S. (2013), "A new ornithopod (Dinosauria; Ornithischia) from Antarctica", Cretaceous Research, 41: 186–193, doi:10.1016/j.cretres.2012.12.004, hdl:11336/76749
- Graham Land and South Shetland Islands, BAS: British Antarctic Survey, 2005
- "Howarth Glacier", Geographic Names Information System, United States Geological Survey, United States Department of the Interior
- "Lomas Ridge", Geographic Names Information System, United States Geological Survey, United States Department of the Interior
- Novas, F.E.; Cambiaso, A.V.; Lirio, J.; Núñez, H. (2002), "Ameghiniana", Paleobiogeografía de los dinosaurios cretácicos polares de Gondwana (Resúmenes), vol. 39, no. 4: 15R
- Rozadilla, Sebastián; Agnolin, Federico L.; Novas, Fernando E.; Aranciaga Rolando, Alexis M.; Motta, Matías J.; Lirio, Juan M.; Isasi, Marcelo P. (2016). "A new ornithopod (Dinosauria, Ornithischia) from the Upper Cretaceous of Antarctica and its palaeobiogeographical implications". Cretaceous Research. 57: 311–324. doi:10.1016/j.cretres.2015.09.009. hdl:11336/46572.
- Rubin, Jeff (2008), Antarctica, Lonely Planet
- Salgado, L.; Gasparini, Z. (2006). "Reappraisal of an ankylosaurian dinosaur from the Upper Cretaceous of James Ross Island (Antarctica)". Geodiversitas. 28 (1): 119–135.
- "Swift Bay", Geographic Names Information System, United States Geological Survey, United States Department of the Interior

This article incorporates public domain material from websites or documents of the United States Geological Survey.
