= Ulu Peninsula =

Peninsula in Antarctica

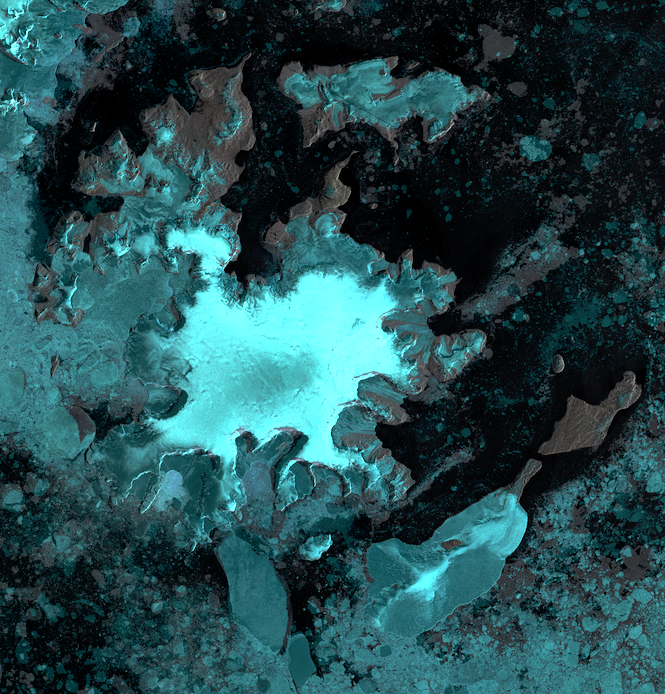
- James Ross Island. Ulu Peninsula in upper left. Vega Island to its right (east)

- Location within Antarctica

Geography
- Coordinates: 63°56′S 58°5′W

Administration
- Antarctica

Ulu Peninsula (63°56′S 58°5′W) is that portion of James Ross Island northwest of the narrow neck of land between Rohss Bay and Croft Bay, extending from Cape Obelisk to Cape Lachman, in Antarctica.

== Location ==
Trinity Peninsula on Antarctic Peninsula. James Ross Island is east of the tip.

Ulu Peninsula forms the northwest of James Ross Island. It is separated from Trinity Peninsula, at the tip of the Antarctic Peninsula to the west, by the Prince Gustav Channel. Vega Island is to the east of the peninsula.

== Name ==
Ulu Peninsula was named descriptively by the United Kingdom Antarctic Place-Names Committee (UK-APC) in 1987. In plan view the cove is shaped like an ulu, a type of knife traditionally used by Inuit women.

== Southwest features ==
Features to the southwest of Holluschickie Bay include, from south to north,

=== Crisscross Crags ===
64°06′S 58°21′W. An irregularly shaped system of crags with arms extending in four directions, rising to 650 metres (2,130 ft) high east of Rum Cove. Named descriptively by the UK-APC in 1987.

=== Rum Cove ===
64°06′S 58°25′W. A cove indenting the northwest coast of James Ross Island between Tumbledown Cliffs and Cape Obelisk. Named in 1983 by the UK-APC in association with the names of other alcoholic spirits on this coast.

=== Tumbledown Cliffs ===
64°05′S 58°27′W. Conspicuous rock cliffs on the west coast of James Ross Island, about 3 nautical miles (5.6 km; 3.5 mi) north of Cape Obelisk. Probably first seen by Doctor Otto Nordenskjold in 1903. Surveyed by the Falkland Islands Dependencies Survey (FIDS) in 1945. The name given by UK-APC is descriptive of the formation of the scree slope at the foot of these cliffs.

=== Kerick Col ===
64°05′S 58°24′W. A col running N-S at 150 metres (490 ft) high between Gin Cove and Rum Cove, in the west part of James Ross Island. Crisscross Crags rise at the east side of the col. In association with names in this area from Rudyard Kipling's The Jungle Book, named after Kerick Booterin, chief of the seal hunters in The White Seal. Named by the UK-APC in 1983.

=== Ineson Glacier ===
64°04′S 58°22′W. A glacier flowing northwest into Gin Cove. Following geological work by the British Antarctic Survey (BAS), 1981–83, named by the UK-APC after Jonathan R. Ineson, BAS geologist in the area.

=== Palisade Nunatak ===
64°04′S 58°15′W. A substantial rock nunatak just north of Rohss Bay and 2 nautical miles (3.7 km; 2.3 mi) southeast of Hidden Lake. Mapped from surveys by FIDS (1960–61). This distinctive ridge-backed nunatak with vertical columnar structure is the largest outcrop of hard intrusive rock on James Ross Island. Named by UK-APC for its resemblance to a palisade.

=== Gin Cove ===
64°03′S 58°25′W. A cove indenting the northwest coast of James Ross Island to the north of Tumbledown Cliffs. In association with the names of other alcoholic spirits on this coast, named Gin Cove by the UK-APC in 1983.

=== Lost Valley ===
64°02′S 58°24′W. A valley to the north of Gin Cove and west of Patalamon Mesa. So named following BAS geological work, 1981–83, in association with Hidden Lake.

=== Patalamon Mesa ===
64°02′S 58°22′W. A flat-topped mountain rising to about 700 metres (2,300 ft) high west of Hidden Lake. In association with nearby Kerick Col, named by the UK-APC in 1987 after Patalamon, son of Kerick Booterin, in Rudyard Kipling's story The White Seal in The Jungle Book.

=== Kotick Point ===
64°00′S 58°22′W. The southern entrance point to Holluschickie Bay. The name, recommended by UK-APC, arose from association with Holluschickie Bay; Kotick was the name of the white seal in Rudyard Kipling's Jungle Book.

=== Hidden Lake ===
64°02′S 58°18′W. A lake, 1.5 nautical miles (2.8 km; 1.7 mi) long, lying midway between Lagrelius Point and Cape Obelisk. It drains by a small stream into the deep bay 4 nautical miles (7.4 km; 4.6 mi) south of Lagrelius Point. Discovered in 1945 by the FIDS, who so named it because it is obscured by surrounding highlands.

=== Back Mesa ===
64°02′S 58°12′W. An ice-covered, flat-topped mountain with rock exposures, 740 metres (2,430 ft) high, located east of Hidden Lake on Ulu Peninsula. Following BAS geological work, 1985–86, named by UK-APC after Doctor Eric H. Back, Lieutenant RNVR, medical officer on Operation Tabarin at Port Lockroy, 1943–44, and Hope Bay, 1944–45.

== Central features ==
Central features, from Lagrelius Point in the west to Blyth Spur in the east, include:

=== Lagrelius Point ===
63°55′S 58°17′W. Low, ice-free point on the northwest side of James Ross Island, 1.5 nautical miles (2.8 km; 1.7 mi) south of Carlson Island. Discovered and first surveyed in 1903 by the Swedish Antarctic Expedition (SwedAE) under Otto Nordenskjöld, who named it Cape Lagrelius after Axel Lagrelius of Stockholm, who contributed toward the cost of the expedition. It was resurveyed by the Falkland Islands Dependencies Survey (FIDS) in 1952. Point is considered a more suitable descriptive term for this feature than cape.

=== Matkah Point ===
63°58′S 58°19′W. The northern entrance point to Holluschickie Bay. The name, recommended by the UK Antarctic Place-Names Committee (UK-APC), arose from association with Holluschickie Bay; Matkah was the mother of the white seal, Kotick, in Rudyard Kipling's Jungle Book.

=== Holluschickie Bay ===
63°59′S 58°16′W. A bay on the west coast of James Ross Island, entered between Matkah and Kotick Points. Probably first seen by Otto Nordenskjöld in 1903. Surveyed by FIDS in 1945. The name arose during a subsequent visit by a FIDS party in 1952, when a large number of young seals was observed near the mouth of the bay. The holluschickie were the young seals in Rudyard Kipling's story "The White Seal" in the Jungle Book.

=== Virgin Hill ===
63°56′S 58°09′W. A hill rising to 665 metres (2,182 ft) high west of Carro Pass. The name derives from Cerro Virgen de las Nieves (Virgin of the Snows hill) applied by Argentine Antarctic Expeditions, 1978. A more concise English form of the name has been approved.

=== Carro Pass ===
63°57′S 58°07′W. A gently sloping snow pass linking Holluschickie Bay and the bay between Rink Point and Stoneley Point. Named for Capitaín Ignacio Carro of the Argentine Army, who first traversed the pass in 1959.

=== Organpipe Nunatak ===
63°59′S 58°07′W. Nunatak rising to 150 metres (490 ft) high in the glacier flowing west into Holluschickie Bay. Named descriptively following British Antarctic Survey (BAS) geological work on the island, 1985–86, from the excellent columnar jointing exhibited on the feature.

=== Seacatch Nunataks ===
63°58′S 58°04′W. A group of nunataks rising to about 500 metres (1,600 ft) high between Carro Pass and Massey Heights. Named by the UK-APC following BAS geological work here, 1981–83. Named after Seacatch, the father seal in Rudyard Kipling's The White Seal, in association with similar names in this area.

=== Massey Heights ===
63°58′S 57°58′W. Prominent, flat-topped rock heights, with steeply cliffed sides, 6 nautical miles (11 km; 6.9 mi) southwest of Andreassen Point. Surveyed by FIDS in 1945 and 1955. Named for Paul M.O. Massey, FIDS medical officer at Hope Bay in 1955.

=== Donnachie Cliff ===
64°01′S 58°04′W. A cliff on Ulu Peninsula rising to about 500 metres (1,600 ft) high northeast of Back Mesa. Following geological work by BAS, 1985–86, named by the UK-APC after Thomas Donnachie, radio operator on Operation Tabarin at Hope Bay, 1944–45.

=== Dobson Dome ===
64°02′S 57°55′W. A prominent snow-covered, dome-shaped mountain 950 metres (3,120 ft) high between Rohss Bay and Croft Bay. Surveyed by FIDS, 1958-61. Named by UK-APC for Alban T.A. Dobson (1885–1962), British civil servant, Secretary of the International Whaling Commission, 1949–59, and President of the International Council for the Exploration of the Sea, 1952–55.

=== Blyth Spur ===
64°03′S 57°51′W. A high spur trending east-southeast from Dobson Dome. Following geological work by BAS, 1985–86, named by the UK-APC after John Blyth, cook on Operation Tabarin at Port Lockroy, 1943–4, and Hope Bay, 1944–45.

== Northwest features ==
Northwest features, from Rink Point in the south to Bibby Point in the north, include:

=== Rink Point ===
63°53′S 58°11′W. A rocky point on the northwest coast of James Ross Island, 2 nautical miles (3.7 km; 2.3 mi) east of Carlson Island. The name arose because, during a visit by an FIDS party in August 1952, the point was surrounded by a large area of slippery, snow-free sea ice resembling a skating rink.

=== Whisky Bay ===
63°53′S 58°09′W. A bay between Rink Point and Stoneley Point. The bay was almost surely discovered by Otto Nordenskjöld of the SwedAE in 1903, who roughly mapped this area and showed small bays in this position. It was surveyed by FIDS in 1945 and 1952, and later called "Caleta Santa Eduvigis" on an unpublished Argentine Antarctic Expedition map, about 1959. Named by the UK-APC in 1983 in association with nearby Brandy Bay.

=== Stoneley Point ===
63°52′S 58°07′W. A rocky point on the northwest coast of James-Ross Island, 4 nautical miles (7.4 km; 4.6 mi) west of Brandy Bay. Named by UK-APC for Robert Stoneley, FIDS geologist at Hope Bay in 1952.

=== Davies Dome ===
63°53′S 58°03′W. A small ice dome with rock walls at the margins, rising to 400 metres (1,300 ft) high southeast of Stoneley Point. Named by the UK-APC in 1987 after Gwion ("Taff") Davies, general assistant on Operation Tabarin at Port Lockroy, 1943–44, and Hope Bay, 1944–45.

=== Sharp Valley ===
63°52′S 58°04′W. A small valley trending NE-SW, located 1 nautical mile (1.9 km; 1.2 mi) east-southeast of Stoneley Point. Named in 1983 by the UK-APC after Michael C. Sharp, BAS field assistant in the area, 1981–82.

=== Lewis Hill ===
63°51′S 58°04′W. A hill 75 metres (246 ft) high topped by three volcanic plugs, located 1 nautical mile (1.9 km; 1.2 mi) east-northeast of Stoneley Point. Named by UK-APC following BAS geological work in the area after Mark P.O. Lewis, BAS field assistant in the area, 1982–83; Station Commander at Rothera, 1980–82, and Faraday, 1982–84.

=== San Carlos Point ===
63°50′S 58°02′W. The southwest entrance point of Brandy Bay. A refuge hut called "Refugio San Carlos" was established on this point by the Argentine Antarctic Expedition in 1959. Following geological work in the area by BAS, 1981–83, the point was called "Brandy Point" in association with the bay, but later named San Carlos Point.

=== Brandy Bay ===
63°50′S 57°59′W. A bay 2 nautical miles (3.7 km; 2.3 mi) wide on the northwest coast of James Ross Island, entered west of Bibby Point. Probably first seen by Otto Nordenskjöld in 1903. Surveyed by FIDS in 1945. During a subsequent visit to this bay by a FIDS party in 1952, there was a discussion as to whether medicinal brandy should be used as treatment for a dog bite. The name arose naturally from this incident.

=== Bibby Point ===
63°48′S 57°57′W. A steep rocky point with snow slopes falling away inland, at the northeast corner of Brandy Bay. Named by UK-APC for John S. Bibby, FIDS geologist at Hope Bay, 1958–59.

== Northeast features ==
Northeast features, from Stickle Ridge in the south to Cape Lachman in the north, include:

=== Stickle Ridge ===
63°56′S 57°55′W. A ridge rising to about 720 metres (2,360 ft) high, west of Saint Martha Cove. The weathered red lavas of the ridge were examined by BAS geologists during the 1985–86 season. Named descriptively by the UK-APC after the spiny nature of the ridge.

=== San José Pass ===
63°55′S 57°54′W. Pass trending northwest–southeast and rising to about 200 metres (660 ft) high between Lachman Crags and Stickle Ridge. On either side of this pass there are exposures of fossiliferous Cretaceous rocks. Following work in the area, named "Paso San José" after Saint Joseph by an Argentine Antarctic Expedition (announced 1979 by Argentina Ministerio de Defensa).

=== Abernethy Flats ===
63°52′S 57°54′W. A gravel plain cut by braided streams at the head of Brandy Bay, James Ross Island. Named by UK-APC in 1983 after Thomas Abernethy, gunner on HMS Erebus (Captain James C. Ross) during exploration of these waters in 1842–43.

=== Lachman Crags ===
63°52′S 57°50′W. Escarpment which extends in a N-S direction for about 5 nautical miles (9.3 km; 5.8 mi), its high point rising to 645 metres (2,116 ft) high, standing 3 nautical miles (5.6 km; 3.5 mi) south-southwest of Cape Lachman. Surveyed by the FIDS in 1945, and named after Cape Lachman.

=== Crame Col ===
63°49′S 57°53′W. A col at about 175 metres (574 ft) high near the north tip of James Ross Island, trending northeast–southwest between the Bibby Point massif and Lachman Crags. Following geological work by BAS, 1981–83, named by the UK-APC after James A. Crame, BAS geologist from 1976, who worked in the area, 1981–82.

=== Berry Hill ===
63°48′S 57°49′W. Hill rising to 370 metres (1,210 ft) high between Lachman Crags and Cape Lachman. The hill is notable for an exposure of volcanic rocks and probable glacial beds of Pliocene age. Named by the UK-APC, 1987, after Alfred Thomas Berry, Chief Steward in Discovery II, 1929–39; in charge of stores on Operation Tabarin at Port Lockroy, 1943–44, and Hope Bay, 1944–45.

=== Cape Lachman ===
63°47′S 57°47′W. Cape marking the north tip of James Ross Island. Discovered by the SwedAE, 1901–04, under Otto Nordenskjöld, who named it for J. Lachman, a patron of the expedition.

== Sources ==
- Alberts, Fred G., ed. (1995), Geographic Names of the Antarctic (PDF) (2 ed.), United States Board on Geographic Names This article incorporates public domain material from websites or documents of the United States Board on Geographic Names.
- Graham Land and South Shetland Islands, BAS: British Antarctic Survey, 2005

This article incorporates public domain material from websites or documents of the United States Geological Survey.
