= Ferjeselskapet Drøbak–Hurum–Svelvik =

Transport company in Norway, 1931–2021

AS Ferjeselskapet Drøbak–Hurum–Svelvik
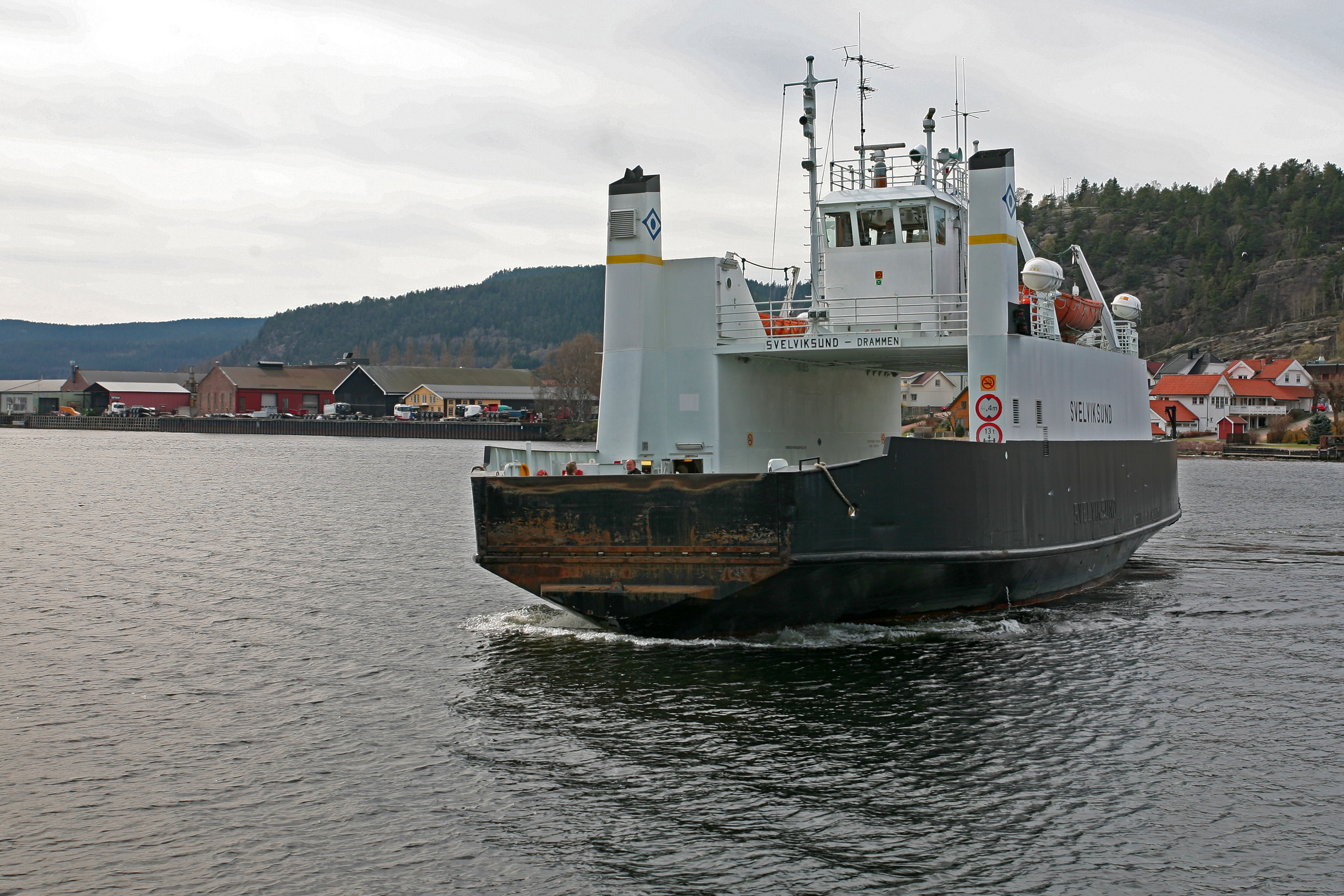
- MF Svelviksund
- Type: Private
- Industry: Shipping
- Founded: 30 April 1931; 95 years ago in Drøbak, Norway
- Defunct: 31 December 2021
- Fate: Dissolved
- Headquarters: Drøbak, Norway
- Area served: Oslofjord
- Products: Storsand–Drøbak; Svelvik–Verket

AS Ferjeselskapet Drøbak–Hurum–Svelvik (FDHS, colloquially known as Ferjeselskapet) was a shipping company based in Drøbak, Norway. It was founded as Bilferjen Drøbak–Hurum in 1931 to operate the Storsand–Drøbak ferry crossing of the Oslofjord, connecting Hurum to Drøbak. It extended with a second ferry service, Svelvik–Verket, from 1972.

The company was also involved some adjoining operations, such as fjordjazzcruises, the tourist office in Drøbak and the sale and maintenance of fire equipment. It also operated its ferries for trucks with dangerous waste to the island of Langøya for Norsk Avfallshåndtering. The 2000 opening of the Oslofjord Tunnel closed the Storsand–Drøbak service. Svelvik–Verket was lost to a public service obligation tender from 2013, but FDHS was kept on as a subcontractor until the end of 2021. All operations ceased from 1 January 2022 and the company was later dissolved.

== History ==
=== Establishment ===
By the 1920s, Drøbak had become a major port along the Oslofjord, with many steamships stopping by. The situation in Hurum was quite different, with few stops. The larger steamship companies did not do any cross-fjord services across Drøbaksundet, so the only means of crossing was by rowing or sailing across. There were some people who offered such services on an ad-hoc basis.

Both Sætre and Tofte were growing industrial towns, and resulting in the need for a road between them. Completed in 1932, it was built along the fjord shoreline, including past the farm of Sundby. Its owner, Harald Halvorsen, took initiative to start a cross-fjord ferry service, and was able to convince the municipal councils of both Hurum and Drøbak to join in as shareholders. Halvorsen owned the necessary quays on the Hurum side, while Drøbak Municipality agreed to upgrade part of its port to support a ferry. The company was incorporated on 30 April 1931 as AS Bilferjen Drøbak–Hurum. It received a share equity of 20,000 kroner.

The company was in need of a ferry, and chose to look for a suitable hull, which it could then have repurposed as a ferry. Board member Emil Ombudstvedt suggested that an acquaintance of his, Ingvald Furre, had a hull. The board agreed to purchase the ship for 18,500 kroner, rebuilt as a ferry, for delivery on 30 June 1931. It turned out that the rebuilding costs exceeded the sales price, and Furre abandoned his obligations, leaving it to the ferry company to complete the works at their own expense. In the end the ferry cost the company 25,000 kroner. To finance the deficit, additional shares for 5000 kroner were issued.

The initial ferry, MF Leif I, could start operations between Drøbak and Storsand on 15 May 1932. Initially the company provided five to six round-trip crossings per day during the summer. By the end of the 1932, Leif I had transported 3500 passengers, 700 cars and 300 bicycles.

The issue with the ferry procurement became a head-ache for the company. It quickly became evident that had they actually done due diligence of Furre, they would quickly have discovered he was a convicted liquor smuggler. Ombudstvedt, as the only board member who knew Furre and had recommended him, was blamed by many for the affair. A rumor spread that Ombudstvedt had received a commission from Furre to sell the hull to the ferry company. In the end the issue ended in court. Ytre Follo District Court acquitted Ombudstvedt for the claims that he had received payments from Furre, but also acquitted Carl Gundersen, board member and major of Drøbak, for insult against Ombudstvedt.

=== Early operations ===
Car traffic was at the time highly seasonal, with the winter hindering any functional use of cars. For the first years, the company therefore only ran services for the summer. At the time, the ferry route crossed the county border between Akershus and Buskerud. The company applied both counties for subsidies, but were rejected. By the end of the season on 18 September 1934, the company was in dire need to replace the motor on Leif I. They were saved by both Hurum Municipality and Drøbak Municipality issuing a joint guarantee for a new engine. Leif I could therefore start the 1935 season on 24 April with more power and higher operating speed. A trial with winter services was introduced from 1 October 1936, with three daily crossings.

The company had a loss of 4670 kroner in 1937. From 1938 the road from Storsand to Filtvet in Hurum was upgraded to a national road, and the national government took over funding. This also meant that the ferry service became a national road ferry, and would receive government subsidies for the operating deficit.

Traffic slowed during the Second World War from 1940 to 1945. However, as a national ferry service, the route was kept operating. The Kriegsmarine attempted to requisition the ferry a few times, but backed down due to the importance of the crossing. There was tight rationing of fuels, but the ferry was able to receive enough to retain a skeleton service throughout the war.

One of the founders and board members, Andreas Anderssen, commanded the torpedo battery at Oscarsborg Fortress during the German invasion of Norway on 9 April 1940. His leadership was instrumental in the sinking of German cruiser Blücher during the Battle of Drøbak Sound. Despite this, the German occupational forces allowed him to continue as board member on the ferry company.

=== Larger ferries ===
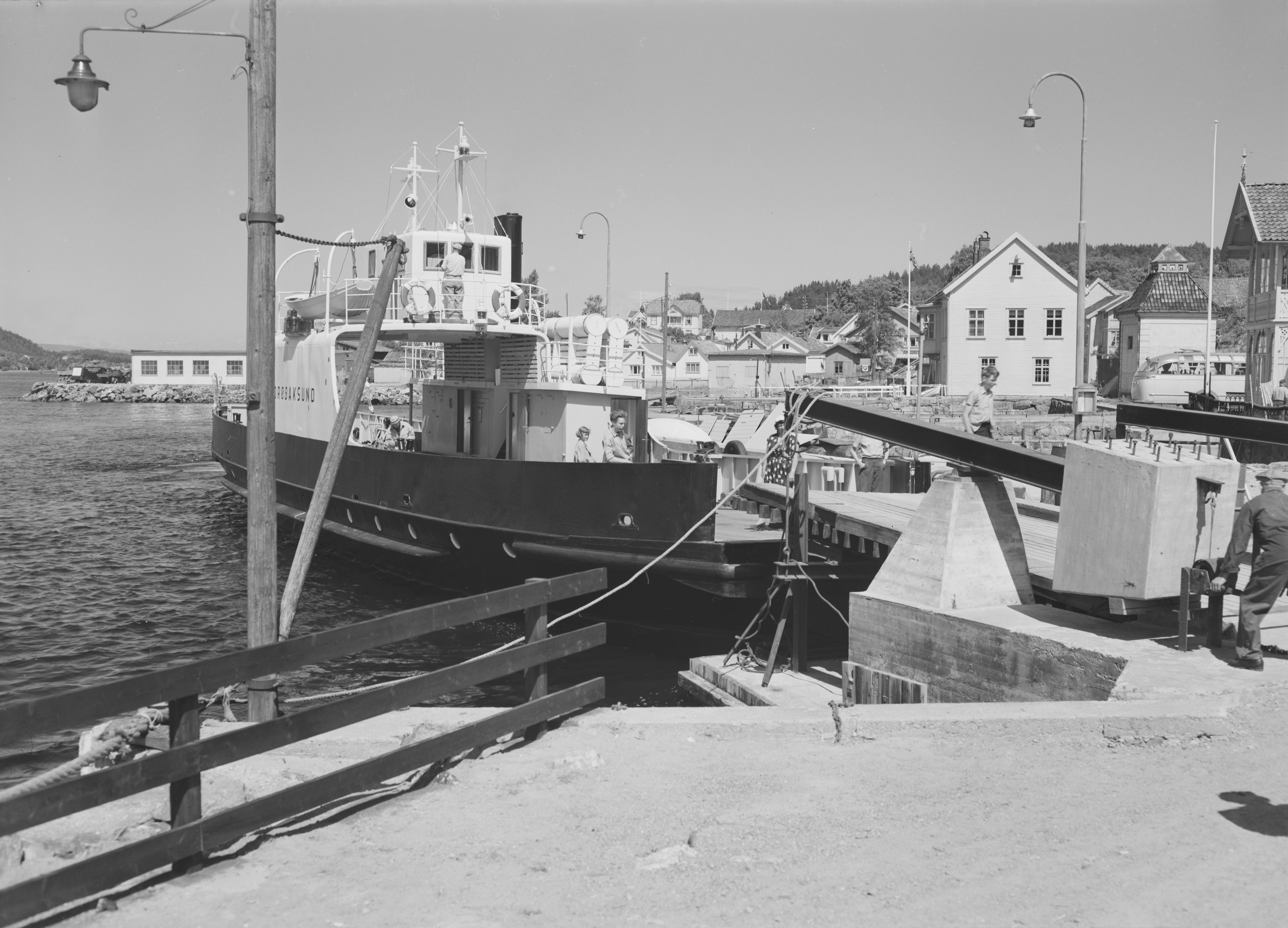
MF Drøbaksund at quay at Drøbak in 1957

Leif I was increasingly becoming too small for the service, and the company needed to procure a larger ferry. The chaise fell on SS Louise II, a fjordsteamer operated by Dampskibsselskapet Asker, Røyken og Hurum, originally built in 1899. She was bought in 1951, and sent to Soon Slipp og Mek. Verksted, where she was stripped of everything except her hull, and rebuilt as a roll-on/roll-off car ferry. She was named MF Drøbaksund and had a capacity of 14 passenger car equivalents. She was leased to Møre og Romsdal Fylkesbåtar for a year on the Magerholm–Sykkylven route, before returning. She entered service on the Storsand–Drøbak route in 1954, allowing Leif I to be sold.

By the mid-1960s, the maintenance costs of Drøbaksund were reaching such levels that the company's management believed that it would be cheaper to buy a new ferry. To finance this, new B-shares were issued in 1968. These 650 shares gave a right to vote, but not receive dividends, and were bought equally by Frogn Municipality and Hurum Municipality. The rest of the funding would be secured through a government guarantee for a loan.

A used ferry was bought from Denmark, costing 650 thousand kroner. It had been built in 1962, and had a capacity for 24 car units. She was renamed MF Drøbaksund II. Once ordered, the quays at both sides of the fjord needed to be upgraded. She arrived at Drøbak on 30 August 1968, but an engineer's strike delayed the work on the new quays. In September the rudder shaft on Drøbaksund broke. The Public Roads Administration refused to pay for the repair of a ship which would be imminently retired. She subsequently lost her registration and taken out of service. For the winter, a small passenger ship was chartered for passengers across the fjord, while road vehicles had to drive around via Oslo. Drøbaksund II entered service on 14 April 1969.

From the start, the ferry company had not had a full-time director, but had instead had a part-time ship's husband to take care of administration. From 1969 the administration was outsourced to the bus company Ingeniør M. O. Schøyens Bilcentraler. They transferred Alf Pedersen to act as manager for the ferry company. When the agreement came to an end in 1977, the ferry company instead hired Pedersen to work for them directly as managing director.

=== Second route ===
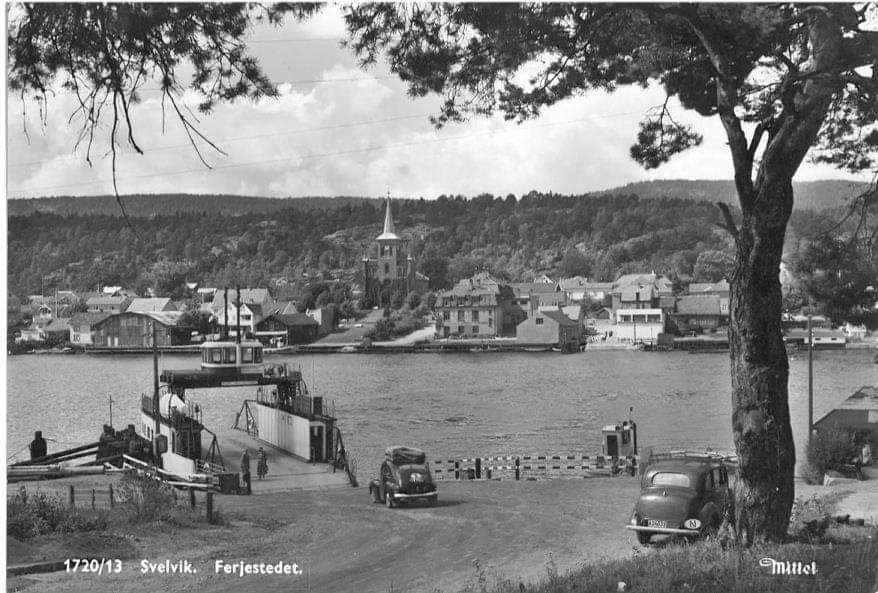
MF Svelvikferja at Verket in 1960

The ferry between Svelvik and Verket had traditionally been operated by the Public Roads Administration. In the early 1970 they wanted to pull out entirely from operating ferries, and started negotiations with Bilferjen Drøbak–Hurum if they wanted to take over the route, which was located on the other side of Hurum. An agreement was struck in June 1972, whereby the company received necessary concessions and could buy the existing ferry, MF Svelvikferja.

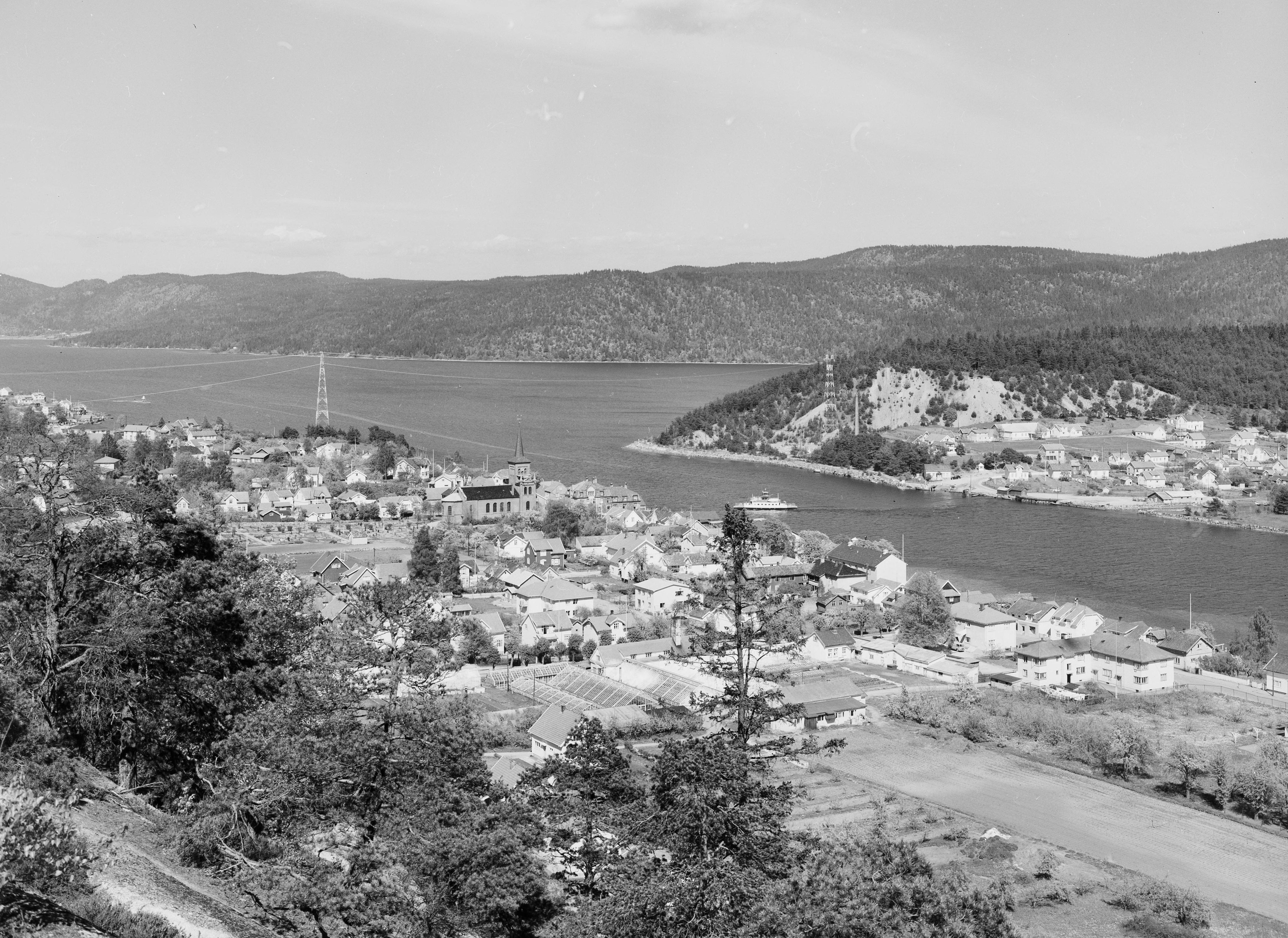
MF Svelvikferja, showing the short distance between Svelvik and Verket

The age of Svelvikferja indicated that a new ferry would be needed for the route. The location of the existing quays was problematic, and the company and the road authorities agreed on a new location for quays on each side. The new quays were completed in 1978, at the same time as a ferry was delivered from Skaaluren Skipsbyggeri. Named MF Svelviksund, it had a capacity for 20 road vehicles. The location of the new quays made the trip significantly longer, increasing from five to seven minutes.

The new route crossed yet another municipal (and county) line. The ferry company wanted to have Svelvik Municipality as a partial owner, and they were able to buy some shares and get a seat on the board.

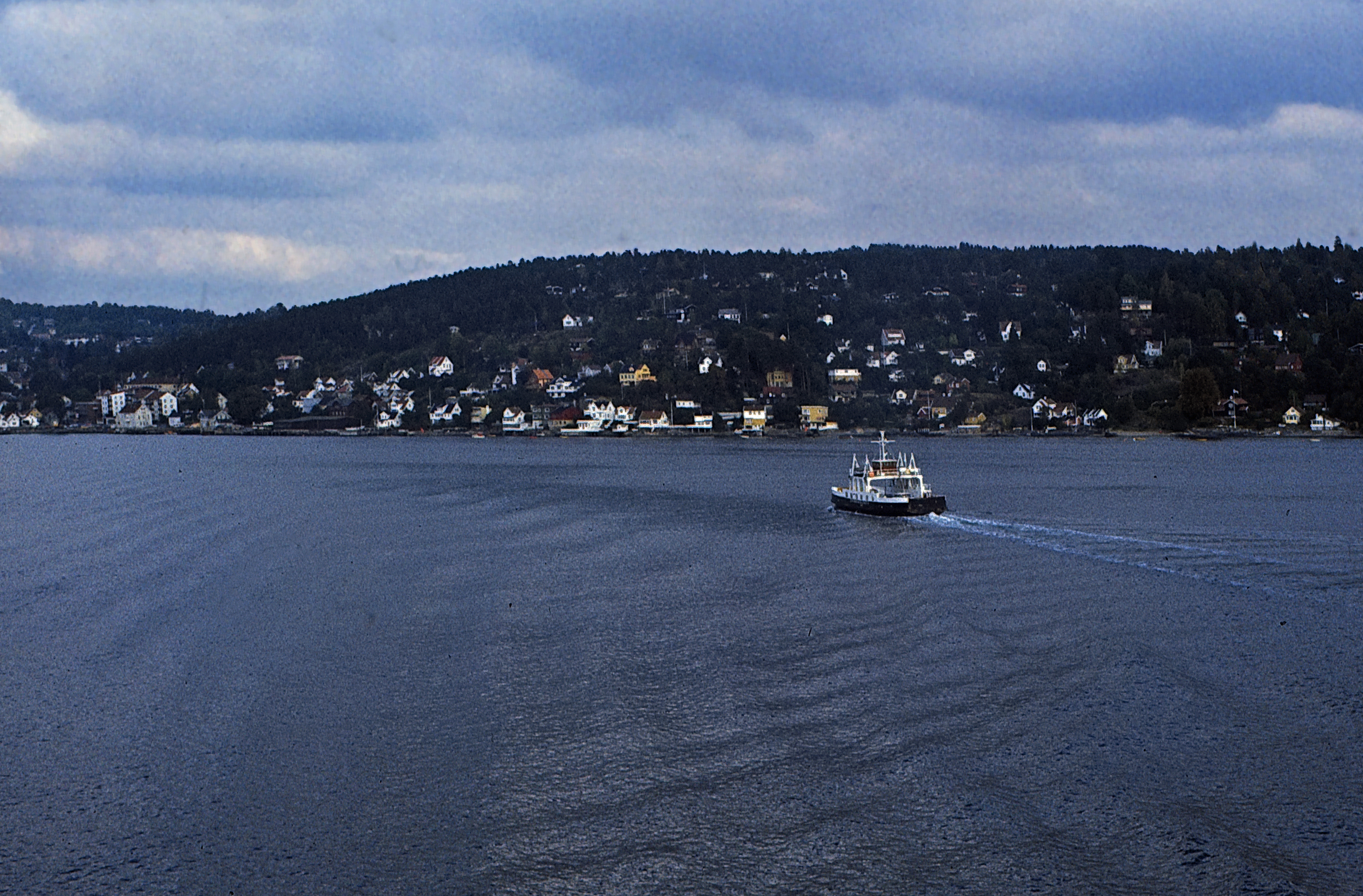
MF Drøbaksund II on the Storsand–Drøbak crossing in 1984

MF Drøbaksund II was in need a major overhaul in 1978, so the company chartered MF Kvarven from Rutelaget Bergen–Vest. Happy with the ferry, it was bought outright the following year. It was modernized and widened at Akers Mekaniske Verksted, and given the name MF Drøbaksund I. She remained in regular use for ten years, and was then kept on as a reserve ferry, until being sold in 1994.

By the 1980s, Drøbaksund II was reaching the limits of its technical age, and was either in need of a major upgrade or replacement. New height requirements for trucks meant that the ferry company started looking for a new vessel. They landed on buying MF Mjøsfergen IV, which was no longer needed on the lake of Mjøsa after the Mjøsa Bridge opened in 1985. In order to freight her down, she was chopped in three and transported as an extra wide load along the highway to Framnæs Mekaniske Værksted, where she was enlarged and the modules reassembled. She was named MF Drøbaksund III. She was a large step up, with a 160-capacity lounge, proper toilet facilities and a capacity of 45 car units. Having served in Mjøse, which tended to freeze, she was capable of handling much more sea ice than her predecessors. To fit the new ferry, new quays had to be built at both Drøbak and Storsand. She entered service in 1987.

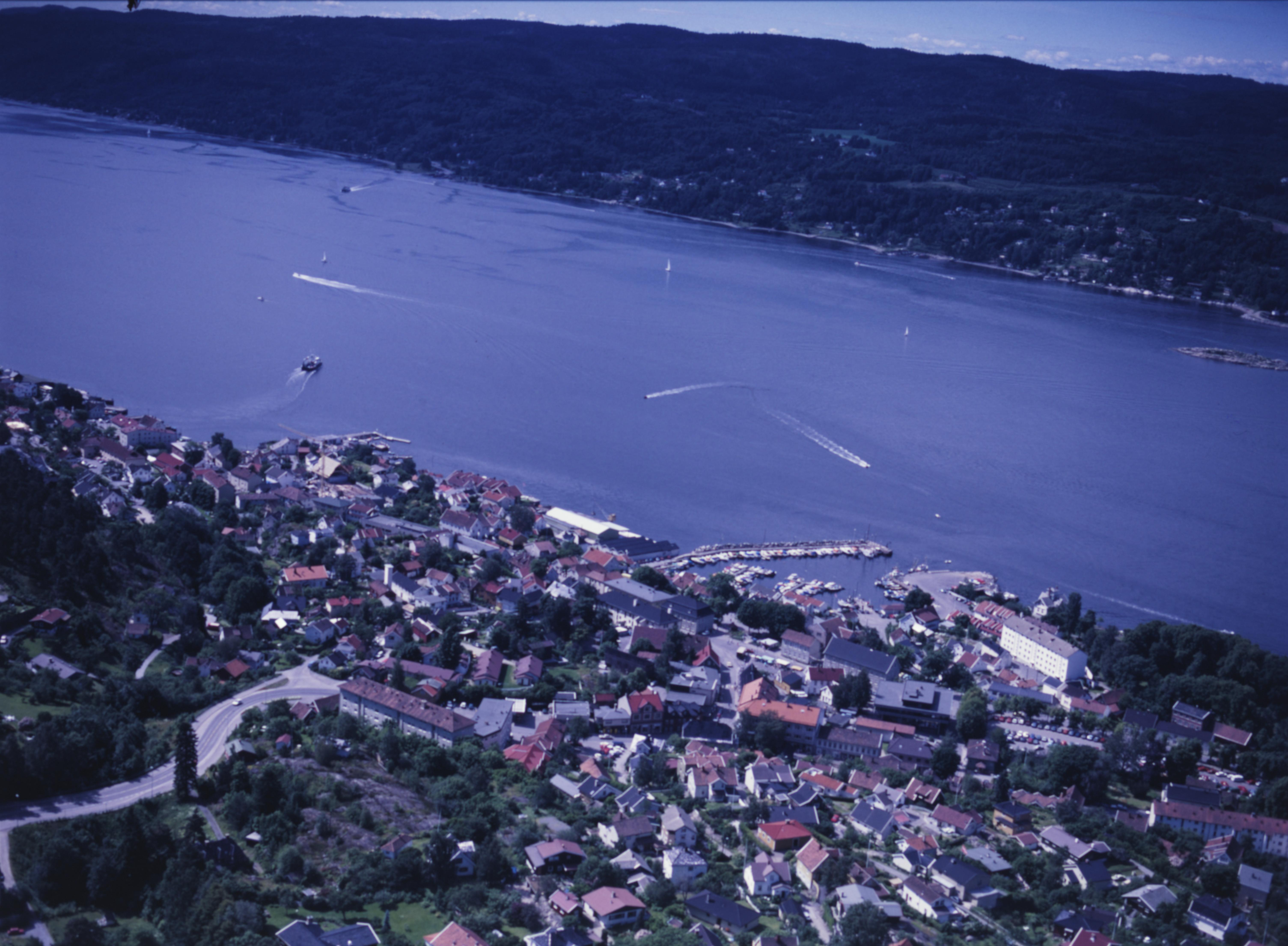
Drøbak and Drøbaksundet, with the ferries crossing the fjord during the late 1980s or early 1990s

There was eventually also a need for a larger reserve ferry to replace Drøbaksund II. The company landed on the used ferry MF Sand, originally built in 1978. She was renamed MF Hurumferja and bought in July 1993. She took 24 car units.

The company's only significant accident took place 6 February 1998. During heavy fog and cold weather, Drøbaksund III crashed into the cruise ferry MV Queen of Scandinavia, which was en route up the Oslofjord. Drøbaksund III was damaged, but returned to service.

=== Diversification ===
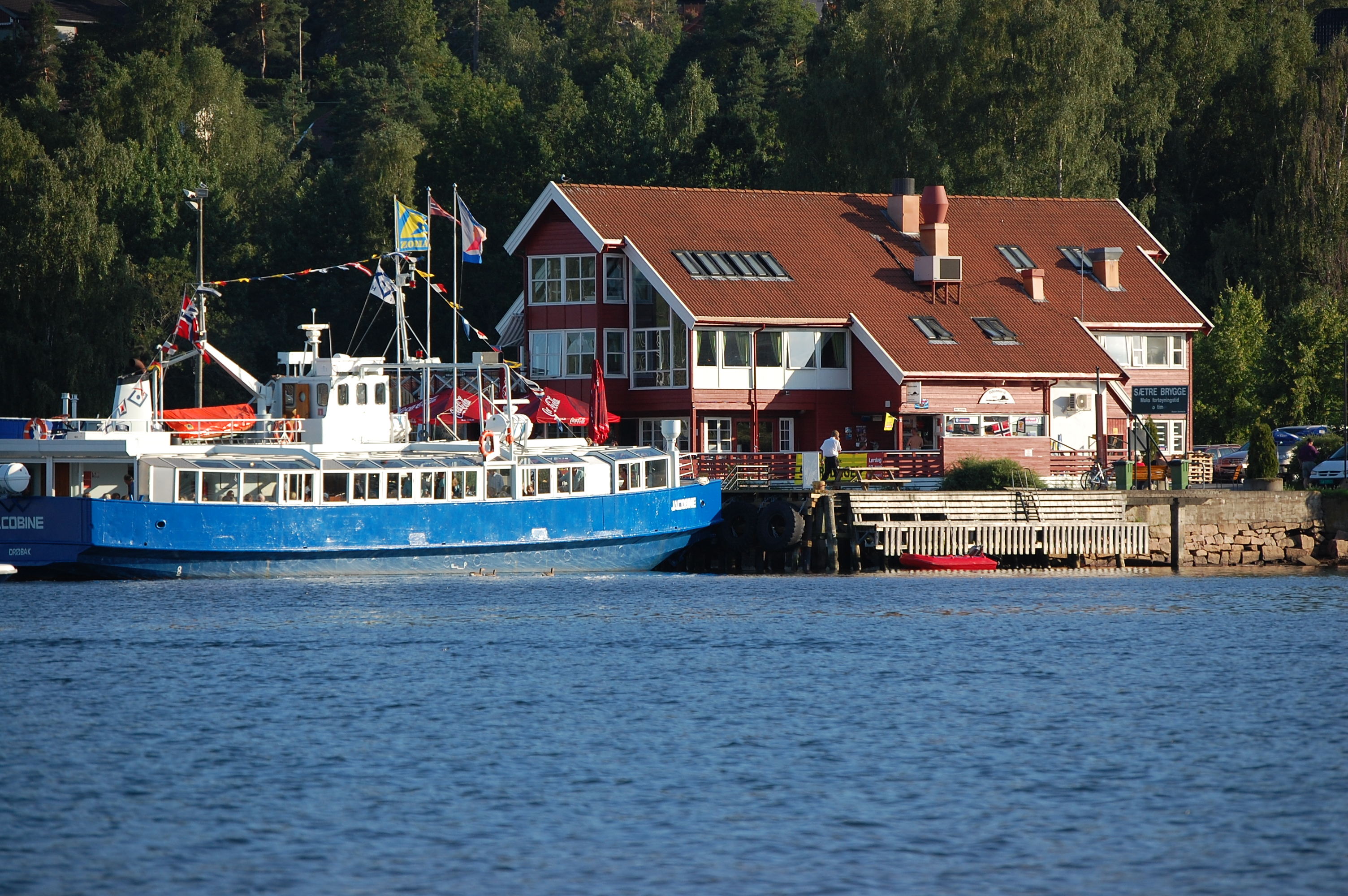
MF Jacobine docked at Sætre in 2009

The company started with fjordcruises in 1989. It bought MF Hvalerferja in 1991, renamed her Jacobine and rebuilt it to act as a floating restaurant and tourist cruiser. Although popular to begin with, it became increasing difficult to turn a profit when the novelty effect went over. Jacobine was sold in 2012.

Frogn Municipality wanted to grow its tourism, and bought the property Havnegata 4 in Drøbak to be used as a tourist information office. The operations of this was outsourced to the ferry company, as the municipality was a major shareholder. The company's administration also moved into the building in 1995. The same year Pedersen was replaced by Grethe Syvertsen as managing director, a position she would retain until the company closed down. Operations of the tourist office lasted until 2012.

The ferry company started an ad-hoc ferry service for Norsk Avfallshåndtering (NOAH) from 1991, with a regular service beginning in 1994. NOAH operated a special garbage dump on the island of Langøya, and were in need of a ferry service to bring trucks with garbage to the island. There was originally no proper quays either on the island or at Holmestrand, so ferries had to be run from either Svelvik or Drøbak. The ferry company took over both passenger and increasing cargo traffic, and was operating five days a week from 1995. Initially these services were provided by MF Drøbaksund I.

The company established a division providing sale and maintenance of fire fighting equipment. The idea was that the people involved with the tourism sector could work with these tasks during the off months. These operations were closed in 2013.

=== Oslofjord Tunnel ===
Proposals for a fixed link crossing of Drøbaksundet were first launched in 1958. It was reinvigorated in the late 1970s, when it became clear that a subsea tunnel would be viable, and much cheaper. Hurumlandet was one of the main contesters in the Oslo Airport location controversy, resulting in proposals to replace not only the Storsand–Drøbak ferry, but also the Svelvik–Verket crossing with fixed links. The Oslofjord Tunnel was passed by Parliament on 13 December 1996, with construction starting in 1997. The tunnel and associated auxiliary roads opened on 29 July 2000. With the subsea tunnel, the need for a ferry disappeared, and the Storsand–Drøbak service was terminated the same day. The tunnel also made crossing Hurum to get across the Oslofjord somewhat more rational in some situations, and there was therefore also a fifteen percent increase on traffic on the Selvik–Verket route.

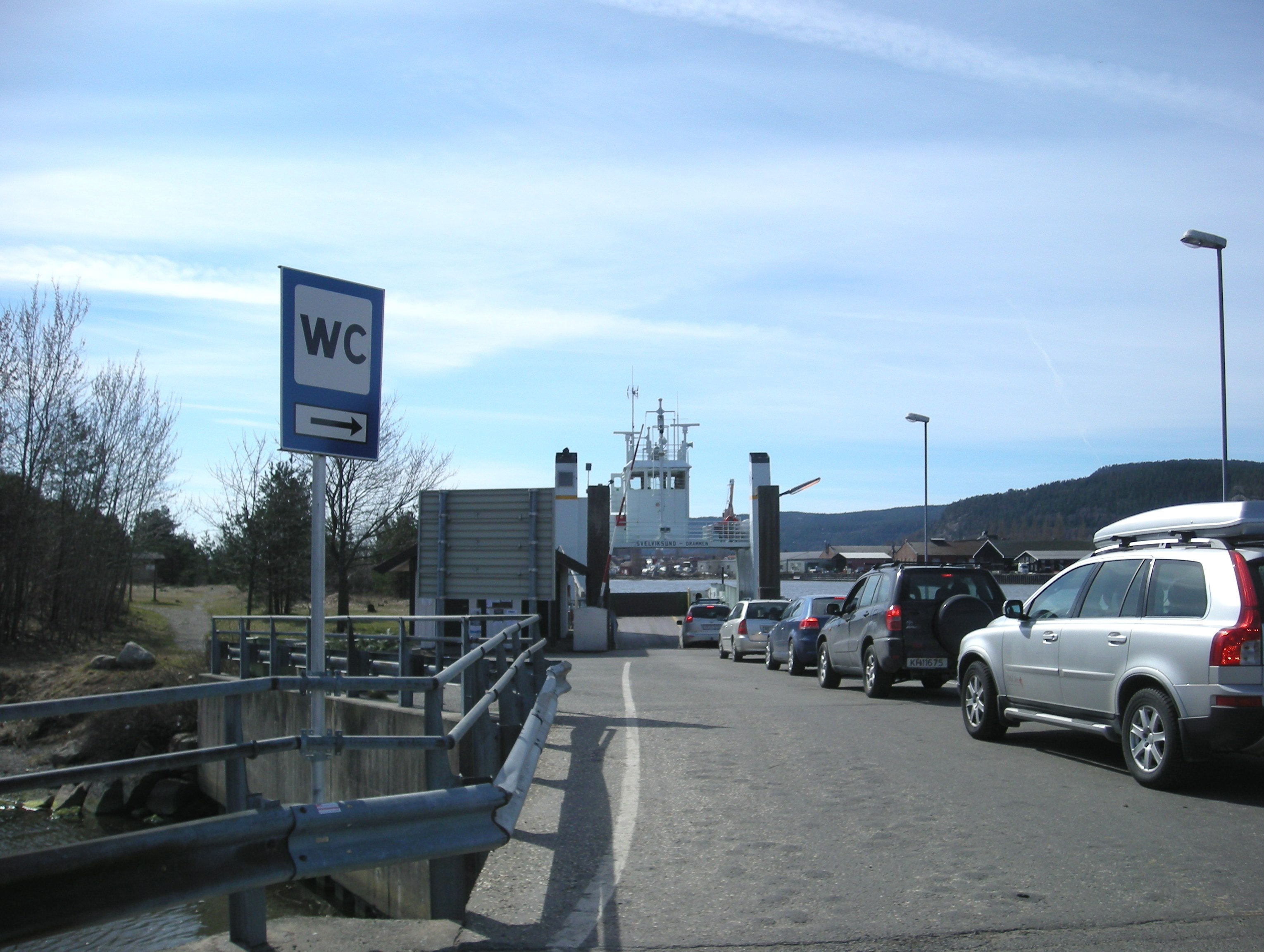
Cars lining up to take MF Svelviksund from Verket in 2009

The company's name, Bilferjen Drøbak–Hurum, would not be representative for the company's operations with the closing of the Storsand–Drøkak route. During the 1980s, the company had introduced a new letterhead with an updated flag and the initials FDHS. The company was colloquially known as Ferjeselskapet, so the board approved a name change to Ferjeselskapet Drøbak–Hurum–Svelvik, effective as of 2000.

The Oslofjord Tunnel was closed on 28 December 2003, after a rock slide. Geologists were worried about additional slides, so the works had to continue for a while. Ferry traffic between Drøbak and Storsand was therefore re-established as a stop-gap measure for about six weeks. The service ran continuously throughout the day to take all the traffic.

The tunnel freed up Drøbaksund III, which was moved to operate to Langøya. The quay was upgraded in Holmestrand and on Langøya, easing operations. From 2003 the ferry company took over the operations of the NOAH-owned passenger ferry Hørtte. She was replaced by Duun jr. in 2007.

=== Final years ===
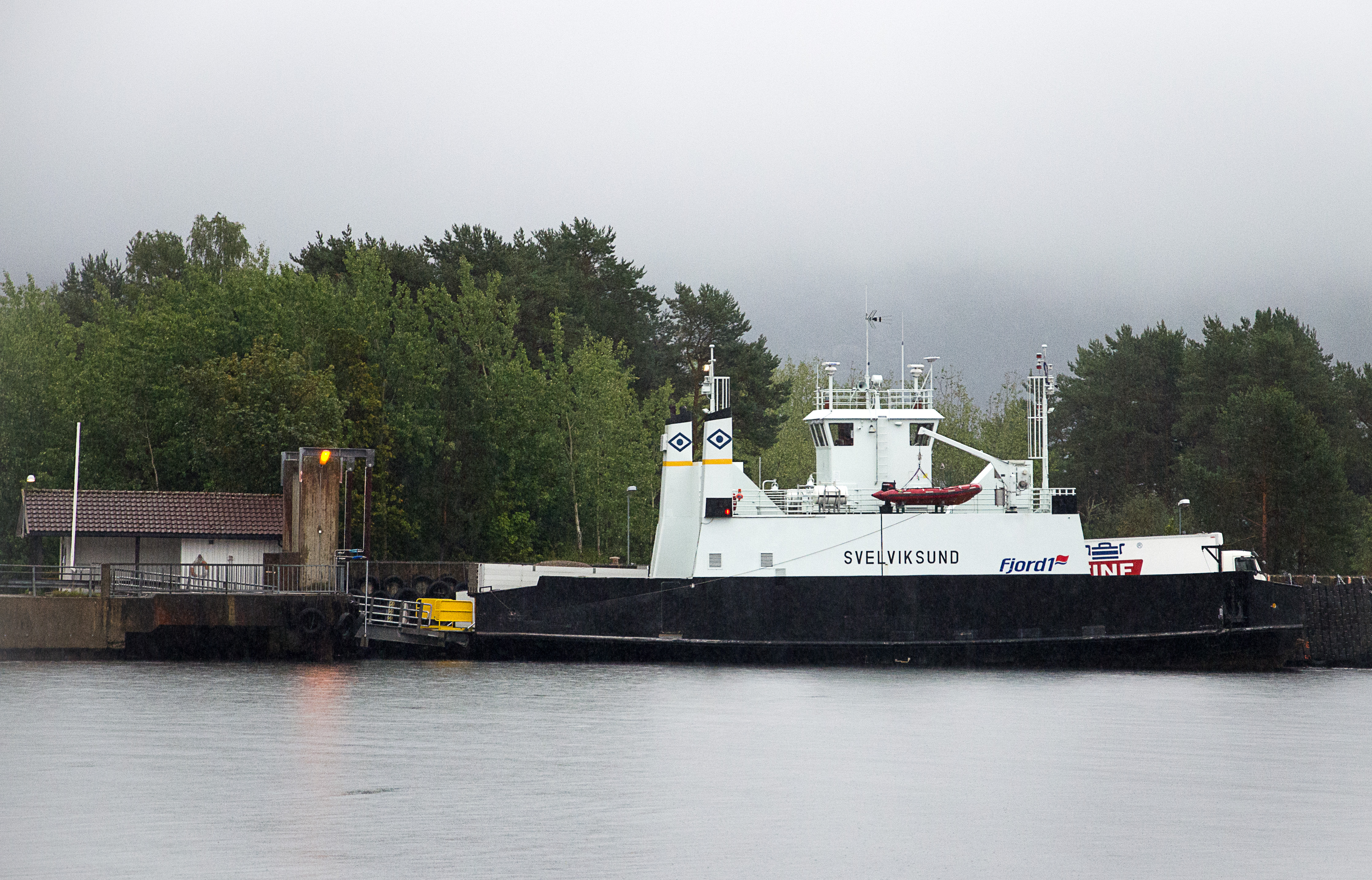
MF Svelviksund docked at Verket in 2014. Despite the Fjord1 logo, the ferry was still being operated by FDHS.

The responsibility for the large parts of the national road network was transferred to the counties on 1 January 2010. Despite crossing a county border, the funding for Svelvik–Verket was transferred to Buskerud County Municipality.

The relationship between the ferry company and NOAH became more and more strained, mostly tied to the pricing of services. In the end the two went their own ways, and FDHS's contract with NOAH ended on 31 December 2012.

Meanwhile all government-subsidized ferry services in the country were becoming subject to public service obligations. The initial tender for Svelvik–Verket was for the period from 2013 to 2020. It was won by Fjord1. However, they were not eager to operate the route themselves, as it was far away from any of their other operations. They therefore struck a deal for FDHS to continue to operate the service as a subcontractor. Including the one-year option, FDHS continued to operate the line until 2021.

In 2019 it was announced that the next tender period, from 2022 through 2031, was won by Bastø Fosen (later renamed Torghatten Sør), who also operates Moss–Horten, the other road ferry crossing of the Oslo fjord.

FDHS continued to operate for the rest of its contract with Fjord1, and then terminated all operations at the end of 2021. Hurumferja was sold to Bastø Fosen, who retain her as a reserve ferry for the crossing. Svelviksund was sold to Fartøysdrift, who uses her on the Lauvvik–Oanes crossing.

== Fleet ==
The following is a list of the ferries operated by the company. It denotes the vessel, the car capacity (PCE), the year the ferry entered service with FDHS and the year its service ended.

Vessel	PCE	Start	End
MF Leif I		1932	1963
MF Drøbaksund		1953	1969
MF Drøbaksund II	20	1968	1988
MF Svelvikferja		1972	1980
MF Svelviksund	20	1978	2022
MF Drøbaksund I	24	1979	1994
MF Drøbaksund III	45	1987	2014
MF Jacobine	10	1993	2012
MF Hurumferja	24	1993	2021

== Bibliography ==
- Asplan (1982). Ferjefri forbindelse mellom E6 og E18 (in Norwegian). Oslo: Ministry of Transport and Communications.
- Messel, Jan (2000). Hurums historie 1900–2000 (in Norwegian). Vol. III. Hurum: Hurum kommune. ISBN 82-91796-88-2.
- Skaare, Erlend (2023). Bindeledd i 90 år (in Norwegian). Optur Forlag. ISBN 978-82-303-5431-5.
