= Norwegian National Road 23 =

Road in Norway

National Road 23
- Bokmål: Riksvei 23; Nynorsk: Riksveg 23

Route information
- Length: 40.2 km (25.0 mi)

Major junctions
- From: Linnevollen, Lier
- E18; Rv282; Rv165; Rv289; Rv281; Rv152; E6
- To: Vessum, Frogn

Location
- Country: Norway

Highway system
- Roads in Norway; National Roads; County Roads

National Road 23 (Norwegian: Riksvei 23), also known as the Oslofjord Link (Norwegian: Oslofjordforbindelsen), was the name of a 40.2 kilometers (25.0 mi) largely limited-access road which connects the municipalities of Lier, Røyken, Hurum and Frogn in Norway. The 7.2-kilometer (4.5 mi) Oslofjord Tunnel causes the road to acts as the only fixed link crossing of the Oslofjord and makes that section subject to tolls. In 2018 the road was renamed into European route E134.

== History ==
=== Planning ===
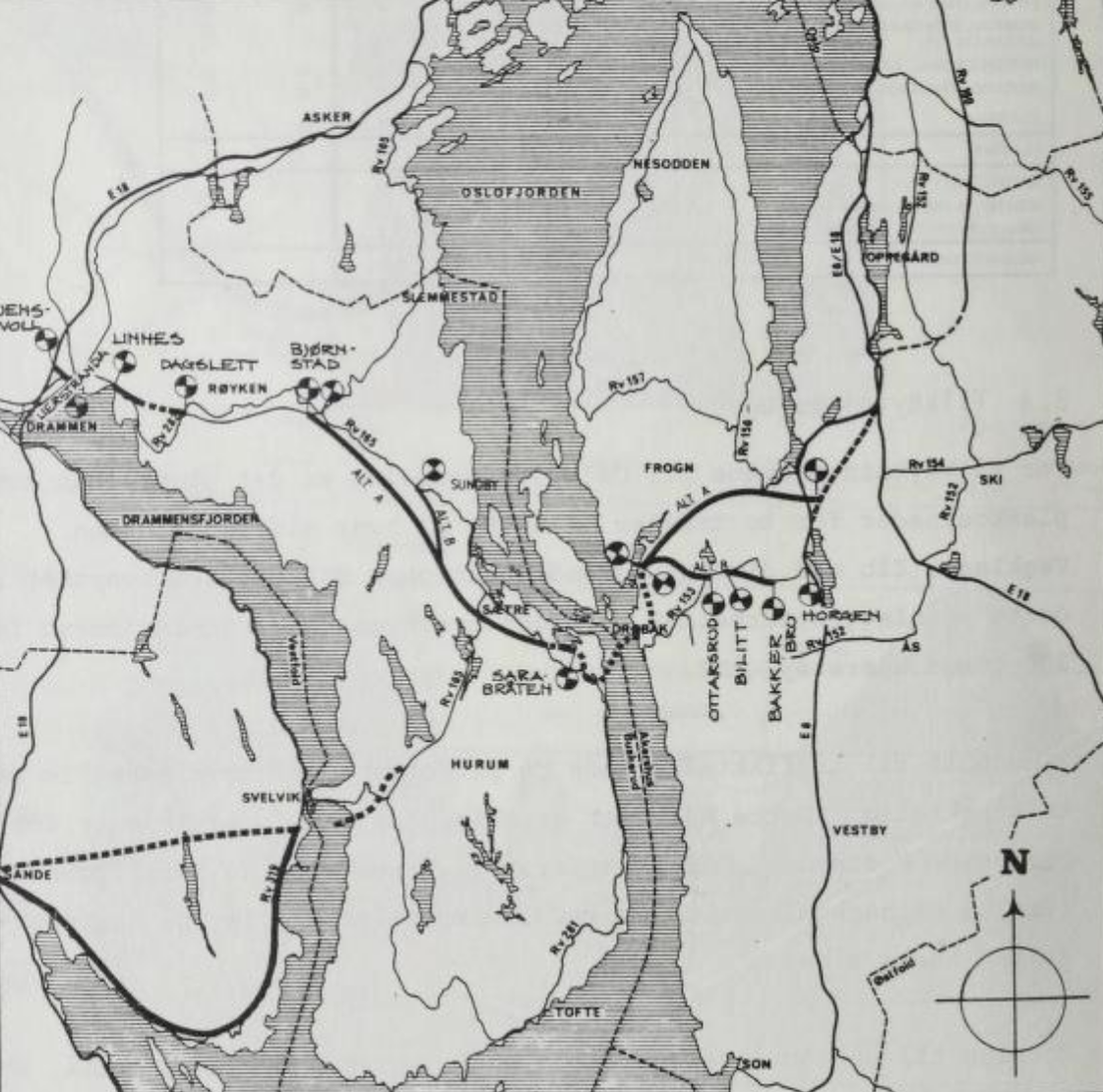
1982 map showing proposals, including a new road to Sande

National Road 23 is the result of the need for an auxiliary road to support a fixed link crossing of the Oslofjord. Since 1939 this crossing was carried out by the Drøbak–Storsand Ferry, a service operated by Bilferjen Drøbak–Hurum. The ferry had a daily traffic of 320 vehicles in 1980. A fixed crossing of Hurumlandet and the Oslofjord was first proposed by Anton Grønsand in 1958. It was followed up in a regional transport plan published in 1963, with a horizon of forty years. Road planning was in the following decade reorganised so that most planning fell within the jurisdiction of a single county. As a crossing of the Oslofjord invariable would have to cross a county border, plans fell outside the natural planning framework. As the idea fell out of the main workload of planners, a limited company, A/S Fjordbroene, was established in 1967. Initiated by Hurum Municipality, it was also partially owned by larger companies in the municipality. It attempted to revitalise the proposal and launched a detailed plan in 1974 which called for two bridges which would connect each side of the fjord to the island of Håøya. The cost of the project was steep, the Håøya bridges alone estimated at 510 million 1981 Norwegian krone (NOK). The plans were rejected by the road administration because of the steep cost and low traffic prognosis, while others criticised the environmental impact it would create on Håøya and at the towns of Svelvik and Drøbak.

Interest in the project was rekindled in the late 1970, when the subsea Vardø Tunnel was planned and later built. The choice of a subsea tunnel alternative would allow for major costs savings, easily shaving away half the cost. Another contributing factor was the Oslo Airport location controversy, which proposed various locations for a new airport. A fixed crossing would be allow for a fixed service from Vestfold and Buskerud if an airport was located in Hobøl or Ås, and it would allow for a fixed service from Follo and Østfold if the airport was located in Hurum. Also the construction of a new plant at Tofte Cellulosefabrikk was expected to give a large rise in lumber transport to the region and could contribute to cross-fjord traffic. Previous analysis had been based on traffic data collected for other uses, so in 1980 a dedicated traffic survey was carried out.

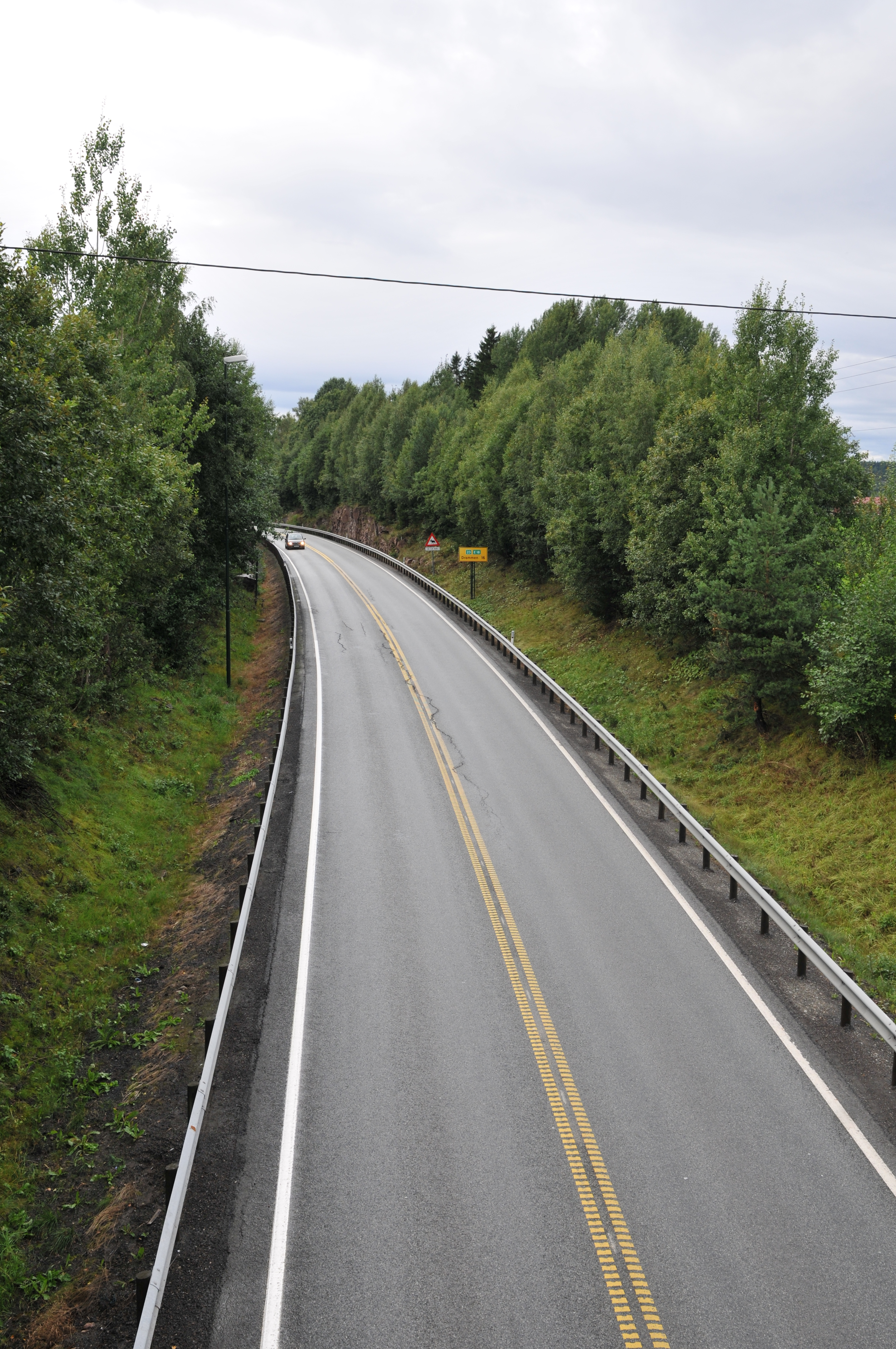
Section of the road in Røyken

A report from 1982 recommended that construction be carried out in two phases. First a road departing from the E18 at Jessvoll near Drammen through Røyken and then under the fjord before terminating at an intersection with the E6. The second phase would see the construction of a road from the tunnel through Hurum to Verket, in a new subsea tunnel under the Drammensfjord near Svelvik and then through a tunnel to Sande, where it would intersect with the E18. Cost estimates for the tunnel ranged between NOK 200 and 360 million. The plans were based on partially using part of National Road 154 in Buskerud for part of the feeder road. Cost estimates for the auxiliary road system was estimated at between NOK 340 and 400 million, depending on the amount of reused road and the standard chosen.

The main public debate rotated around whether to build a bridge, a conventional tunnel or an immersed tube, and whether the crossing should be built with two or four lanes. Parliament voted on 8 June 1988 to build the new national airport at Hurum. The decision included a four-lane motorway-crossing of the Oslofjord. Planning was halted in 1990 after the airport construction decision was shelved. By then only the Socialist Left Party in Hurum Municipal Council being opposed. Without the airport traffic, the profitability in the project fell through and the Public Roads Administration called to instead prioritize other investments. However, Minister of Transport and Communications Kjell Opseth was a staunch supporter of the Oslofjord Link, in part as a compensation for the loss of the airport after it in 1992 was decided to be built at Gardermoen.

The Public Roads Administration landed in 1992 at a bridge alternative as their preferred solution, backed among others by the Norwegian Haulier’s Association and Hurum Municipality. The former stated that a bridge would result in trucks consuming only half as much fuel on the segment, while the latter was also enacted by the prospect of the bridge becoming a tourist attraction. On the other hand, the bridge was met with protests from environmental organizations and residents of Drøbak and the ministry thus decided to go for a tunnel. A full-scale construction was debated, with two tubes and a new highway all the way to Lier. Opseth announced in January 1994 that he favored a four-lane tunnel alternative, largely citing a NOK 170 million cost saving of a NOK 1.25 billion budget. The project was partially met with opposition in Parliament, as for instance Magnus Stangeland of the Center Party stated that other projects should be prioritised. New estimates showed reduced traffic and the issue ended in a compromise: one tube would be built and a new road would only be built as far west at Bjørnstad in Røyken.

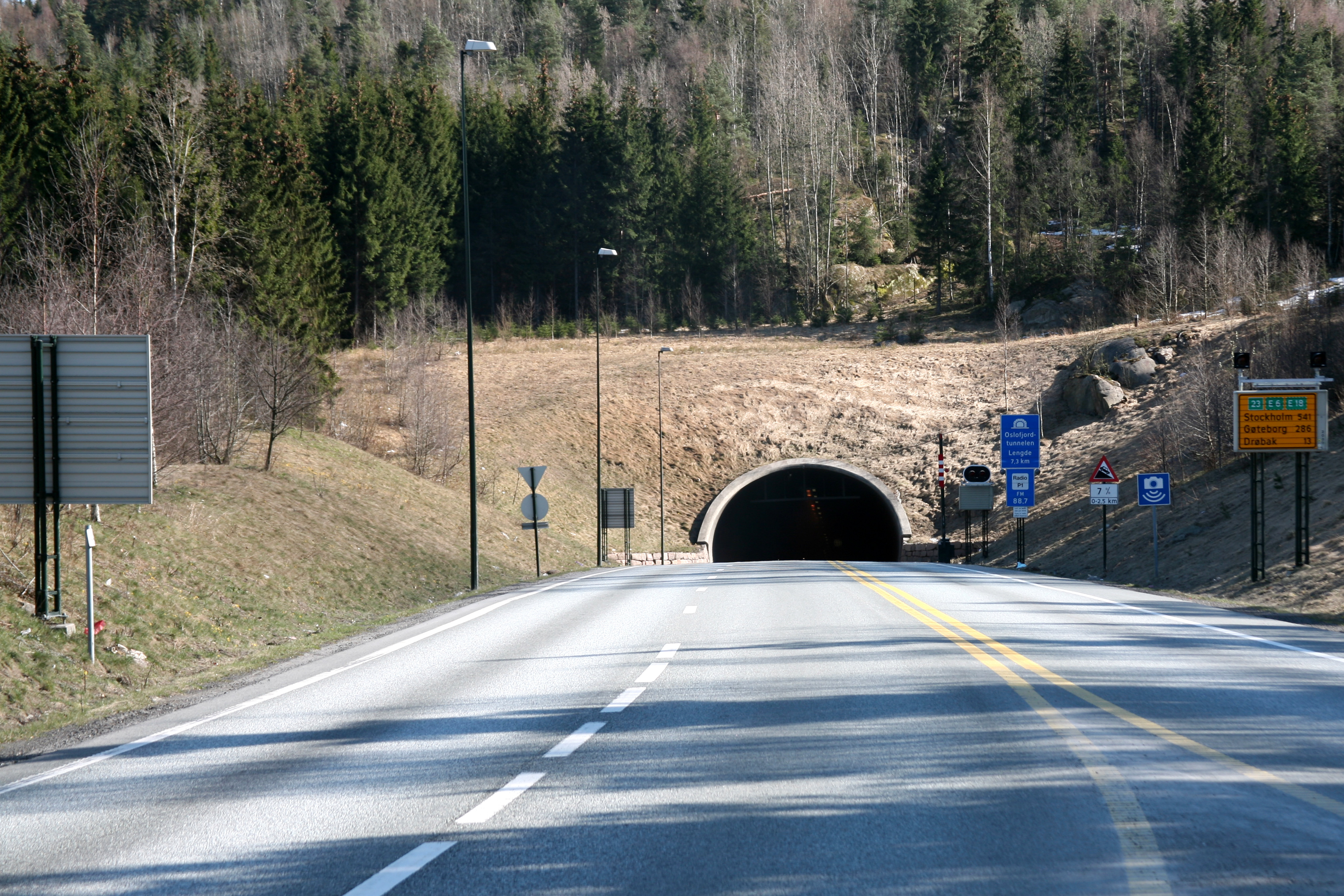
Entrance to the Oslofjord Tunnel from the Hurum side

Financing was secured through a combination of state grants and tolls. The tolls were financed through private debt accumulated by Bompengeselskapet Oslofjordtunnelen, owned jointly by Akershus County Municipality and Buskerud County Municipality and established in late 1995. The single tube reduced the total construction cost to NOK 1,041 million. To cut costs further, plans to build northwards and westwards from Hurum were placed on hold. Thus the new auxiliary road network was limited to 26.9 kilometers (16.7 mi), including the tunnel itself. The toll portion of the investments were set at NOK 699 million.

Frogn Municipal Council attempted to veto the development in November 1995, by demanding that either two or no tubes be built. The ministry stated that they would if necessary pass state zoning laws to avoid such disruptions. The municipal opposition rested in part on opposition to building a new road through a recreational forest area and the auxiliary road would come too close to the settlements at Heer. After the municipal council voted against rezoning, a new zoning plan was thus legislated by the ministry and Frogn Municipal Council lost further ability to participate in the planning. The ministry also decided that the road would be designated National Road 23 and be treated as a trunk route. The tunnel was expected to see a quintupling of the traffic compared to the ferry service. By June 1996 commitments from the Labour and Conservative Party ensured a majority in Parliament for the link. The project was passed by Parliament on 13 December 1996, against the votes of the other parliamentary parties.

=== Construction ===
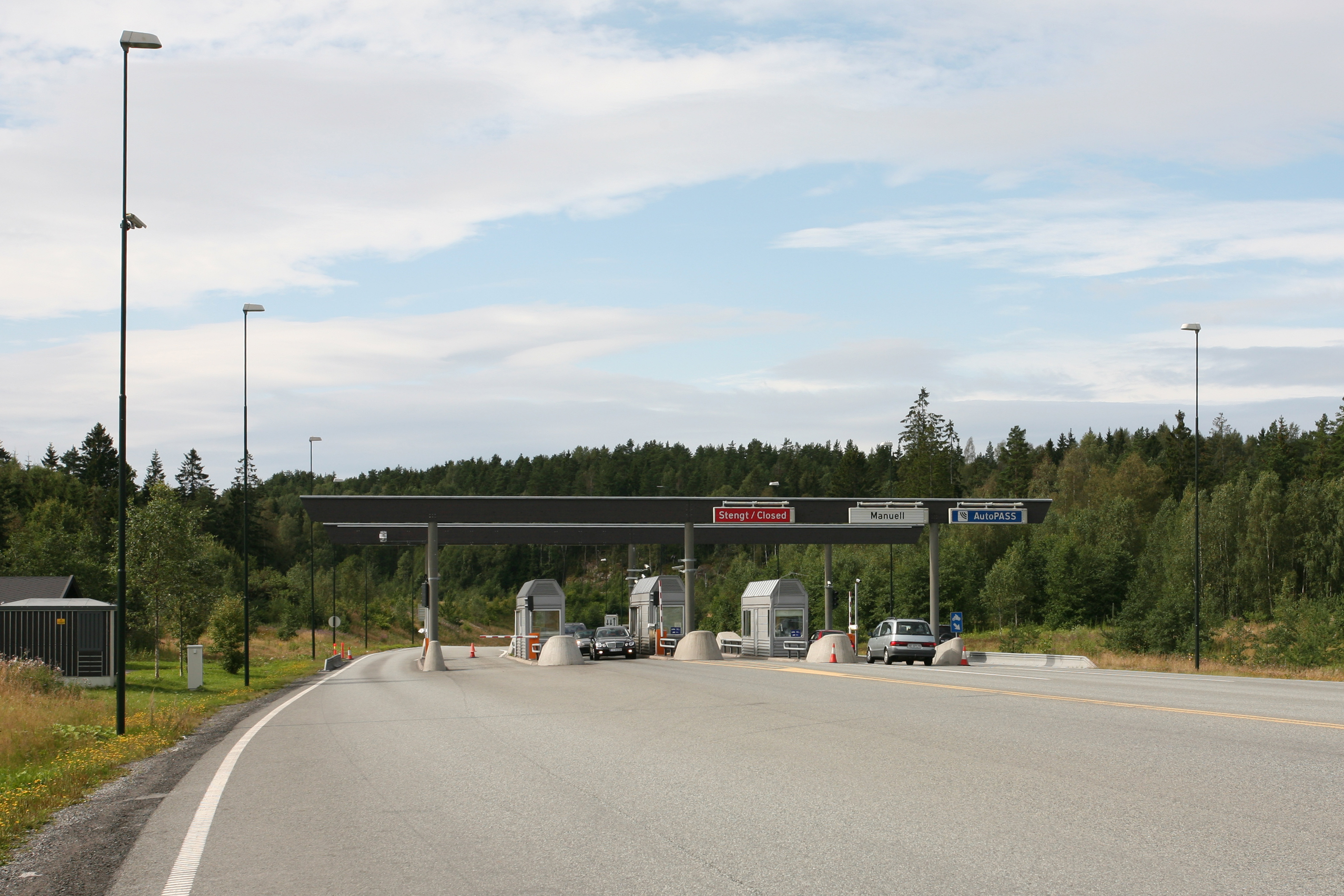
Toll plaza at Måna in Frogn

The road system consisted of six tunnels and eight bridges. The route design was aided by three landscape architects to enhance its aesthetic characteristics. This included blending concrete road and wooden pedestrian bridges with natural granite stones. The contract for blasting the Oslofjord Tunnel, worth NOK 347 million, was awarded to Scandinavian Rock Group. Construction commenced on 14 April 1997, and was completed on 4 February 1999. Construction of the Frogn Tunnel was completed in October 1998. The project experienced a cost escalation of NOK 134, which was related to having to build a more complex interchange at Vessum, increased environmental issues, NOK 30 million used to bypass a difficult sedimentary zone in the Oslo Tunnel and rule changes which required the project to pay overhead on the county road office and value added tax on some additional services.

== Junctions ==
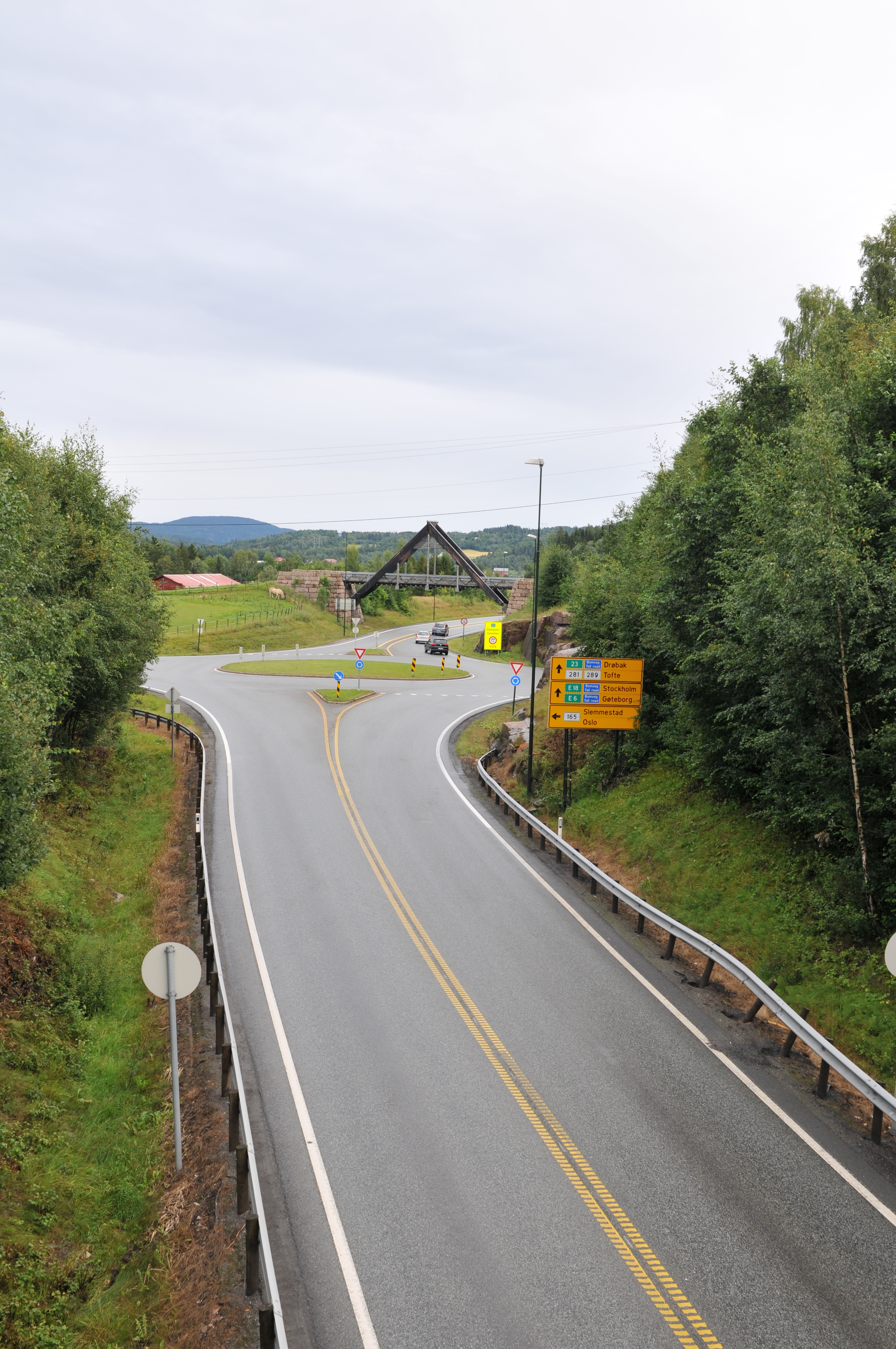
Roundabout with National Road 165

Municipality	Location	Description	Notes
Lier	Linnevollen	E18	Interchange
Lier	Frydenlund	Rv282	Roundabout
Lier	Frydenlund	Bridge over the Drammen Line	
Lier	Gullaug	Bridge over Lierelva	
Lier	Gullaug	Fv18 Tuverudveien	
Lier	Lahell	Fv3 Grimsrudveien	Roundabout
Røyken	Spikkestad	Spikkestadveien	Roundabout
Røyken	Røyken	Fv10 Hyggenveien	Interchange
Røyken	Enga	Rv165 Slemmestadveien	Roundabout
Røyken	Krokodden	Fv11 Hyggenveien	Roundabout
Røyken	Elgskauås	Elgskauås Tunnel	2,630 m (8,630 ft)
Røyken	Sagbakken	Smemyrveien	Roundabout
Hurum	Mørk	Rv289	Roundabout
Hurum	Stampleinås	Stampleinås Tunnel	375 m (1,230 ft)
Hurum	Merraskott	Merraskott Tunnel	305 m (1,001 ft)
Hurum	Verpen	Rv281	Roundabout
Hurum	Oslofjord	Oslofjord Tunnel	7,306 m (23,970 ft)
Frogn	Måna	Toll plaza	
Frogn	Måna	Rv152	Roundabout
Frogn		Frogn Tunnel	1,583 m (5,194 ft)
Frogn	Bråten	Bråten Bridge	212 m (696 ft)
Frogn	Vassum	Vassum Tunnel	378 m (1,240 ft)
Frogn	Vassum	E6	Interchange

== Future ==
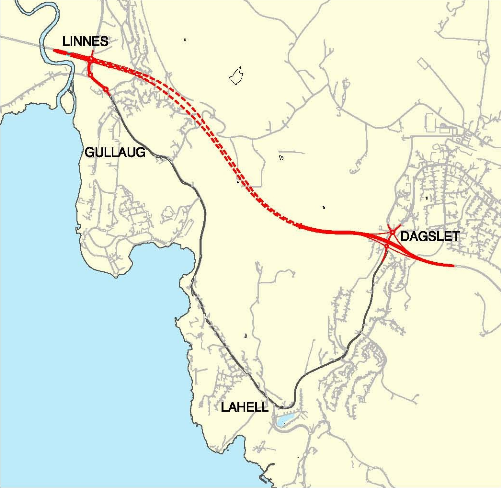
Map of the proposed new motorway section between Dagslet and Linnes

=== Fjord crossing ===
The Public Roads Administration announced on 10 January 2012 that they intended to build a second tube for the tunnel along with a second carriageway on the section of National Road 23 from the tunnel to the Vassum Interchange on E6 in Frogn. The investment was proposed financed through an extension of the toll collection for an additional twelve to fifteen years. Construction is proposed to start in 2016 and the new tube may be opened in 2019. The project is estimated to cost NOK 2.4 billion.

The 6-kilometer (3.7 mi) section of highway between Måna and Vassum is proposed upgraded to four-lane motorway standard. This involves rebuilding the roundabout at Måsa to an interchange, construction of a parallel tube for the 1,610-meter (5,280 ft) Frogn Tunnel, a parallel bridge for the 212-meter (696 ft) Bråtan Bridge and a reconstruction of Vassum Tunnel, which acts as a gradient between a single- and twin-tubed tunnel. Should the project be carried through, the toll collection is proposed prolonged until 2028.

The ministry asked for alternatives, and two bridge proposals were but forward in 2013. The one involves the original crossing via Håøya, estimated to cost NOK 7 billion. Of this, NOK 5 billion would be for the bridges and would have a total length of 13 kilometers (8.1 mi). The second involves a suspension bridge to be built further south in Drøbaksundet, from Vestby, estimated to cost NOK 10 billion. It would have a main span of between 1,300 and 1,500 meters (4,300 and 4,900 ft) and demand 11 kilometers (6.8 mi) of new road. The latter bridge allows for a railway to be carried as well.

Should a bridge be built, the tunnel would be closed. Finalizing a proposal in time for completion by 2019 is regarded by the authorities as crucial, as by that time European Union regulations will be enforced, requiring the tunnel, because its location on a Trans-European Network, to have two tubes or a parallel evacuation tunnel. Alternatively, a new bridge could be built further south to replace the Moss–Horten Ferry. The latter would see the Oslofjord Tunnel remain open, and could or could not result in a second tube being built. The ministry has stated that planning of a bridge would not be completed before 2020.

=== Lier and Røyken ===
The current road between Daglset in Røyken and Linnes in Lier does not meet the current standards for a trunk road. Critical aspects are the lack of limited access, curvature, road width and speed limits. The route also runs in a major detour. Since 2003 the Public Roads Administration has been working on plans for build a new trunk route through this area. It is expected to have a length of 5 kilometers (3.1 mi) and includes a 2.2-kilometer (1.4 mi) tunnel. The route is planned to be built as a four-lane motorway. The project is estimated to cost NOK 1.8 billion and would be partially financed using tolls. Initially, the project had a cost framework of NOK 2.3 billion (2017 NOK). After new cost calculations, the final amount has increased to NOK 3.2 billion (2017 NOK). The project is included in National Transport Plan 2014–23. The Public Road Administration aims at finalizing planning to allow construction to start in 2015 and the road to be completed by 2018.
