= Hans Erik Riwen =

Norwegian politician

Hans Erik Riwen (born 30 July 1935 – 28 March 2010) was a Norwegian politician for the Conservative Party.

He was born in Fredrikstad. He was a member of the Norwegian Young Conservatives central board from 1963 to 1967, and then became a deputy member of Drammen city council. After the 1971 election he became a member of Buskerud county council. He served as county mayor of Buskerud from 1987 to 1991, and remained a council member until 1999.

He spent his professional career as a teacher in Drammen.

Political offices
Preceded by Åse Klundelien	County mayor of Buskerud; 1987–1991	Succeeded by Per Ulriksen
