= Tor Ottar Karlsen =

Norwegian politician (born 1950)

Tor Ottar Karlsen (born 13 March 1950) is a Norwegian politician for the Labour Party.

He was born in Rolvsøy and grew up in Åsgårdstrand. From 1980 to 1992 he was involved in local politics in Lier, and from 1992 to 1996 he chaired the county chapter of the Labour Party. From 1994 to 1996, during Brundtland's Third Cabinet, he was a political advisor in the Ministry of Children and Family Affairs.

Following the 1999 elections, Karlsen became the new county mayor (fylkesordfører) of Buskerud. He was re-elected in 2003, but stepped down before the 2007 election. He is a member of the board in Southern Norway Regional Health Authority.

Political offices
Preceded by Per Ulriksen	County mayor of Buskerud; 1999–2007	Succeeded by Roger Ryberg
