= Åse Klundelien =

Norwegian politician

Åse Klundelien (born 8 January 1946) is a Norwegian politician for the Labour Party.

She was born in Kongsberg. She attended teacher's college from 1963 to 1967, and worked as a teacher. She was a member of Kongsberg city council from 1967 to 1981. She was also a member of Buskerud county council from 1975 to 1987, serving the last term as county mayor. She was elected to the Parliament of Norway from Buskerud in 1989, and sat through one term. She served in the Standing Committee on Transport from 1989 to 1990 and the Standing Committee on Finance from 1990 to 1993, and also in the Standing Committee on Scrutiny from 1989 to 1993. She served as a deputy representative during the terms 1977–1981, 1981–1985, and 1993–1997.

In 1988 she was hired as director of culture in Buskerud County Municipality. She chaired the Norwegian Gender Equality Council (Likestillingsrådet) from 1989 to 1997 and the board of Buskerud Hospital from 1984 to 1987. She was deputy chair of the Norwegian Guarantee Institute for Export Credits in 1995 and board member from 1996 to 1997. She was a deputy member of the Norwegian Language Council from 1980 to 1987 and a deputy board member of Rikshospitalet from 1987 to 1990, the Office of the Auditor General of Norway from 1994 to 2002 and Norges Kommunalbank.

Political offices
Preceded by Arild Hiim	County mayor of Buskerud; 1983–1987	Succeeded by Hans Erik Riwen
