= Roger Ryberg =

Norwegian politician (born 1952)

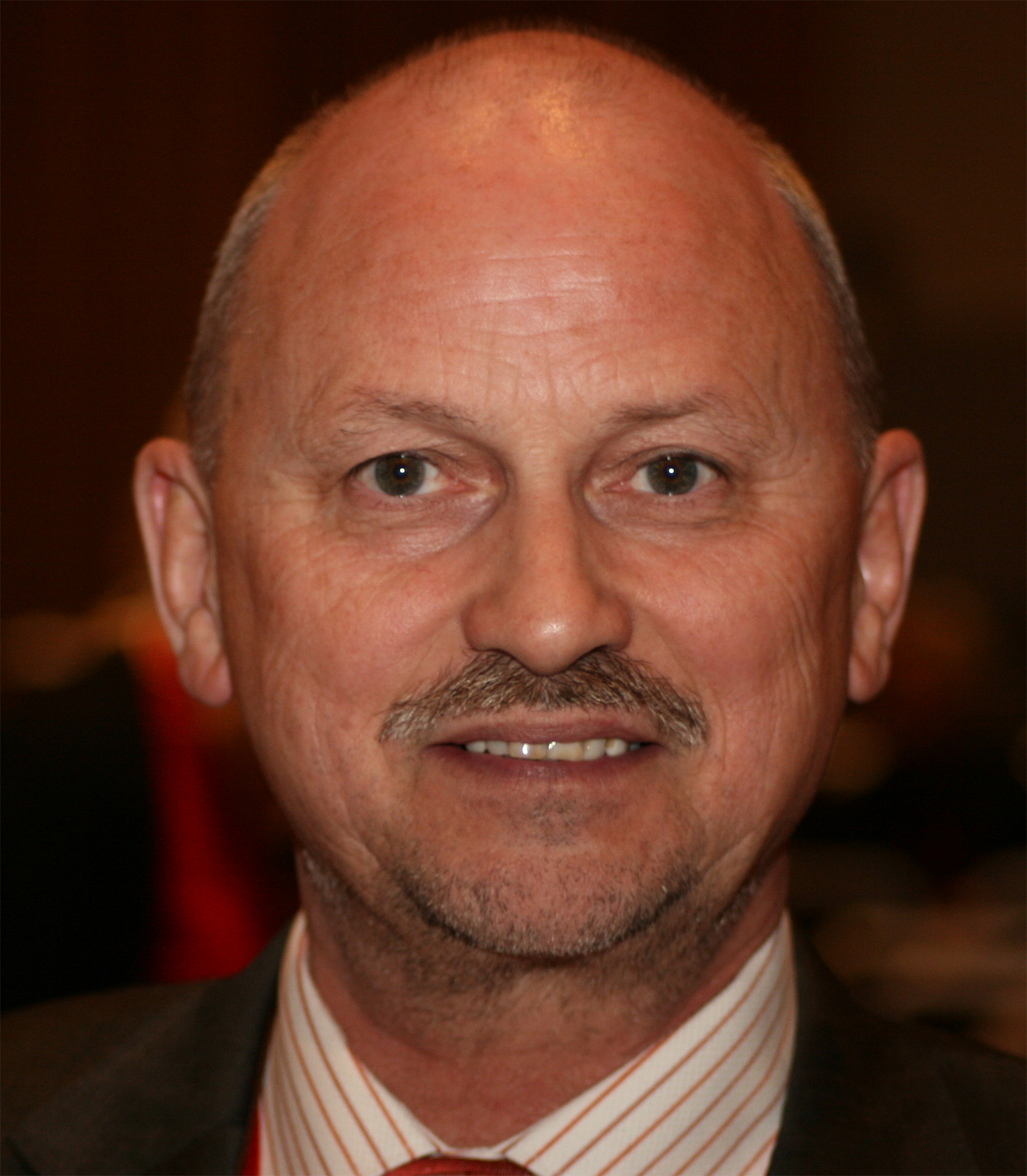
- Ryberg in 2009

County Mayor of Viken
- In office 1 January 2020 – 11 December 2023
- Deputy: Kathy Lie; Camilla Sørensen Eidsvold
- Cabinet chair: Tonje Brenna; Siv Henriette Jacobsen
- Preceded by: Himself, as county mayor of Buskerud
- Succeeded by: Thomas Sjøvold (Akershus); Tore Opdal Hansen (Buskerud); Sindre Martinsen-Evje (Østfold)

County Mayor of Buskerud
- In office 20 October 2015 – 31 December 2019
- Preceded by: Morten Eriksrød
- Succeeded by: Himself, as county mayor of Viken
- In office 9 October 2007 – October 2011
- Deputy: Runolv Stegane
- Preceded by: Tor Ottar Karlsen
- Succeeded by: Morten Eriksrød

Deputy Member of the Storting
- In office 1 October 1989 – 30 September 1993
- Constituency: Buskerud

Personal details
- Born: 16 April 1952 (age 72); Kirkenes, Finnmark, Norway
- Political party: Labour
- Children: 2

Roger Ryberg (born 16 April 1952 in Kirkenes) is a Norwegian politician for the Labour Party. He served as county mayor of Viken from 2020 to 2023. He previously served as county mayor of Buskerud from 2007 to 2011 and again from 2015 to 2019.

Following the 2007 election, Ryberg became the new county mayor (fylkesordfører) of Buskerud. Behind him was a coalition of the Labour Party, the Socialist Left Party, the Centre Party and the Liberal Party, who kept the right-wing candidate Mette Lund Stake at bay with 22 versus 21 votes in the county council. Before being elected county mayor, Ryberg had been mayor of Hurum municipality. He also served as a deputy representative to the Parliament of Norway from Buskerud during the term 1989–1993.

Following the 2019 Norwegian local election, he was elected as the county mayor of the newly established Viken county.

In April 2022, Ryberg announced that he wouldn't be seeking re-election in the 2023 local elections. As Viken was scheduled to be dissolved following the local elections, Buskerud, Akershus and Østfold all elected new county mayors. Ryberg was succeeded by Thomas Sjøvold in Akershus, Tore Opdal Hansen in Buskerud and Sindre Martinsen-Evje in Østfold.

He resides at Filtvet.

Political offices
Preceded by Ulrik Vee	Mayor of Hurum; 2003–2007	Succeeded by Anne Hilde Rese
Preceded by Tor Ottar Karlsen	County mayor of Buskerud; 2007–2011	Succeeded by Morten Eriksrød
Preceded by Morten Eriksrød	County mayor of Buskerud; 2015–2019	Succeeded by Himself, as county mayor of Viken
Preceded by Himself, as county mayor of Buskerud	County mayor of Viken; 2020–2023	Succeeded by Position abolished
