= Filtvet =

Village in Akershus, Norway

Coordinates: 59°34′22″N 10°36′50″E

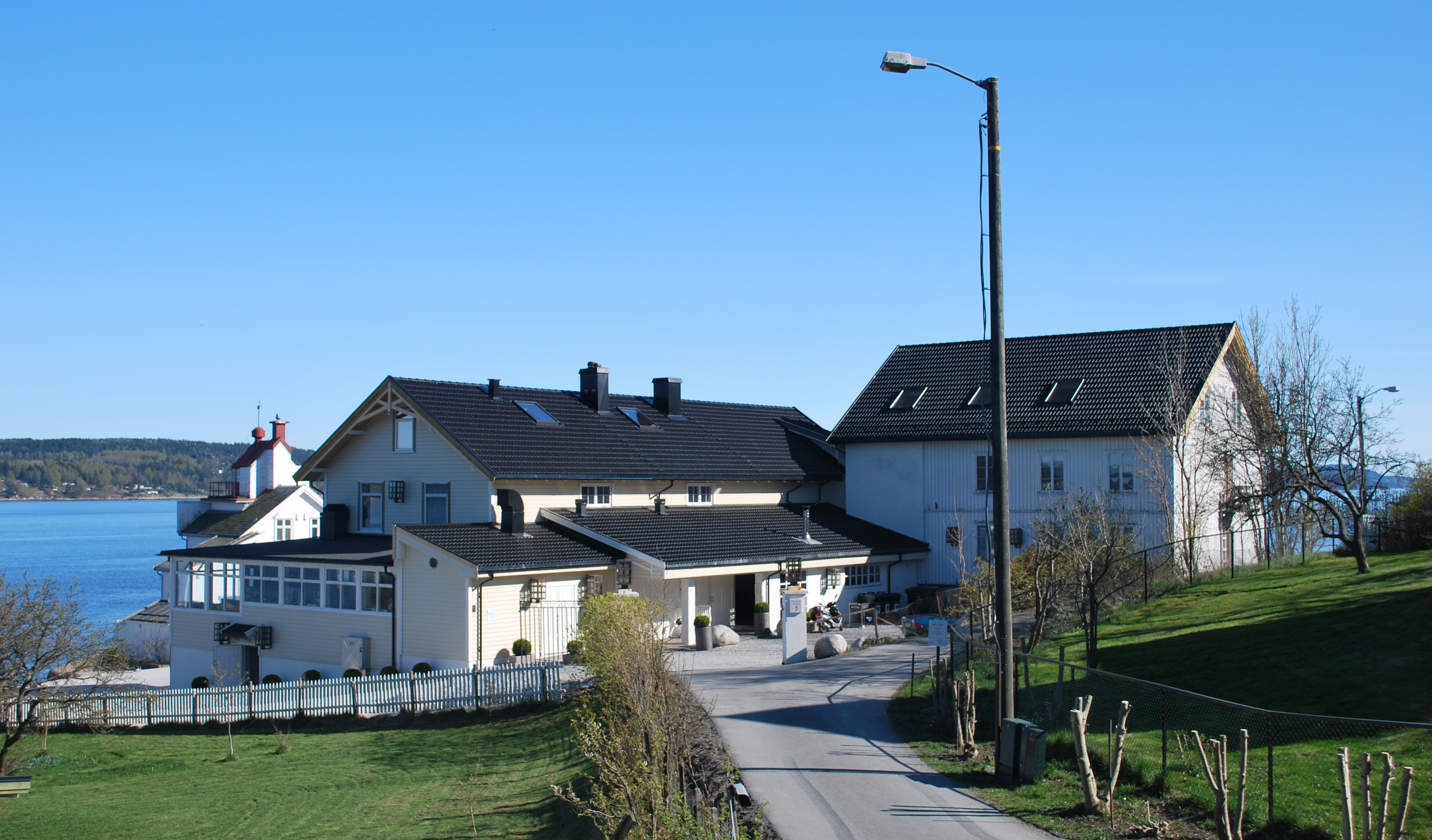
Filtvet

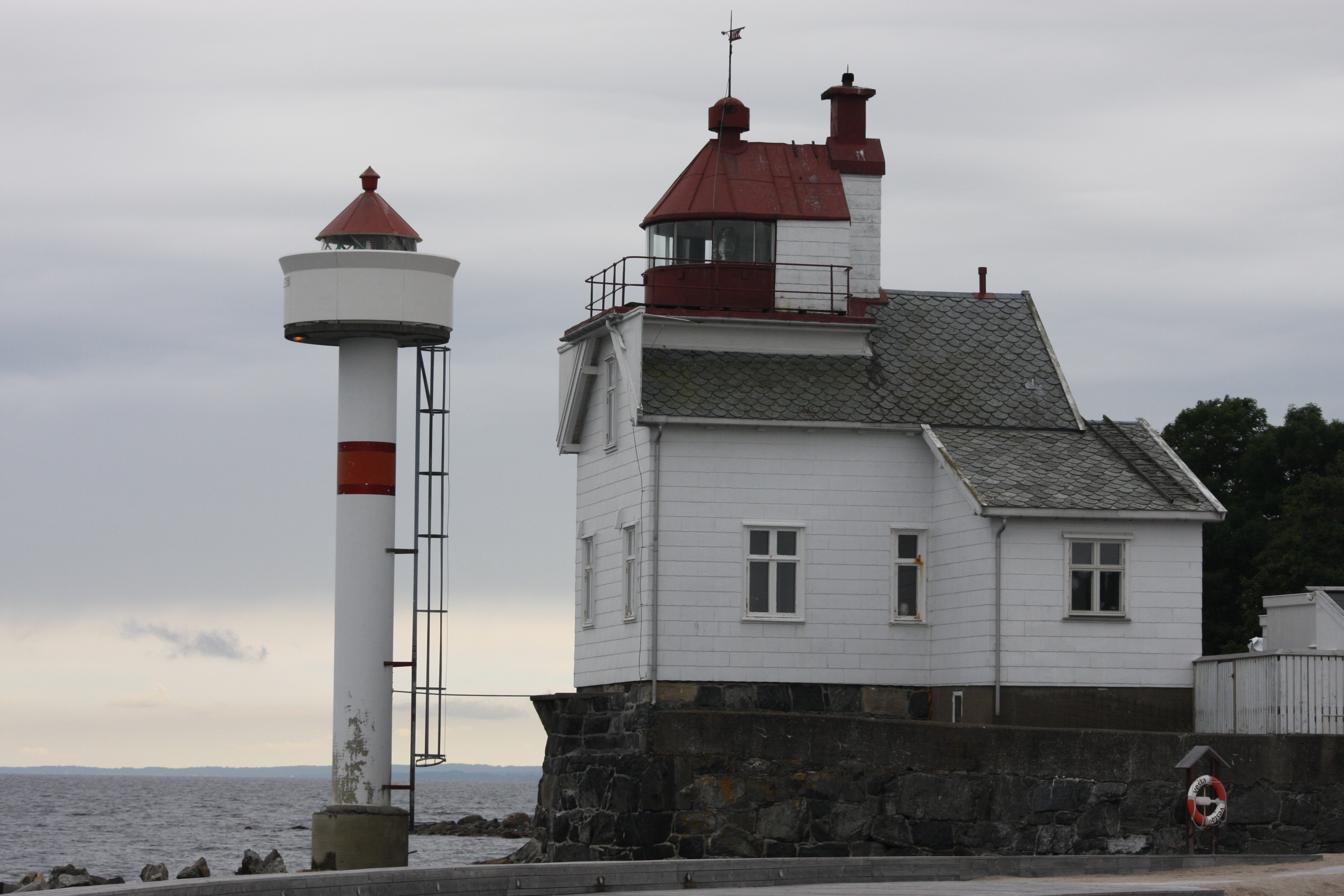
Filtvet Lighthouse

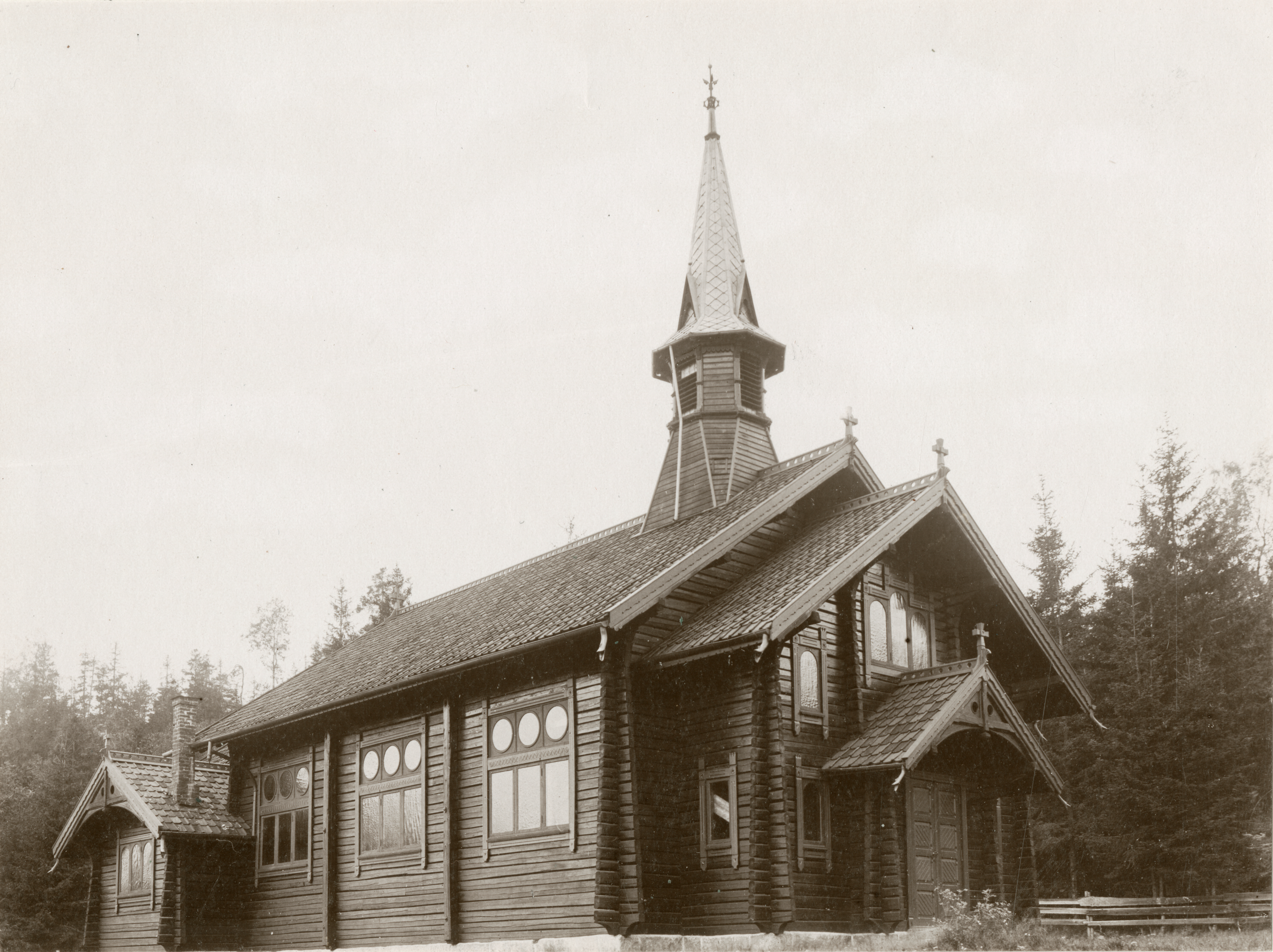
Filtvet Church

Filtvet is a small village along the Oslofjord in Asker municipality, Akershus county, Norway.

== Location ==
Filtvet is a 45-minute journey to Oslo by car and has become a popular tourist destination during summer. Accommodation consist principally of camping sites.

Filtvet lighthouse (Filtvet fyr) is on the west side of Oslofjord at the entrance to Oslo. The lighthouse was deserted in 1985 and replaced with a beacon in front of it.

== Filtvet Church ==
Filtvet Church (Filtvet kirke) dates from 1894. The church was built of timber and has 200 seats. The church was designed by architect Alfred Christian Dahl (1857-1940). Filtvet Church was the first church project for Dahl who went on to distinguished himself as a church architect.

== Notable residents ==
- Ingrid Berntsen - Norwegian freestyle skier
- Hedda Berntsen - Norwegian skier
- Roger Ryberg - Norwegian politician for the Labour Party.
