= Langøya (Holmestrand) =

Island in Holmestrand, Norway

Coordinates: 59°29′35″N 10°22′57″E

Langøya is an island in the Oslofjord in Holmestrand Municipality in Vestfold, Norway.

The island was the site of limestone mining since the 1650s. The island was bought by Christiania Portland Cementfabrik, who mined the limestone for their cement factory at Slemmestad. By 1985 the island had been mined out. Since 1993 the island has been as a toxic waste deposit for Norsk Avfallshåndtering.
