= Buskerud County Municipality =

Buskerud County Municipality Buskerud fylkeskommune
- County municipality
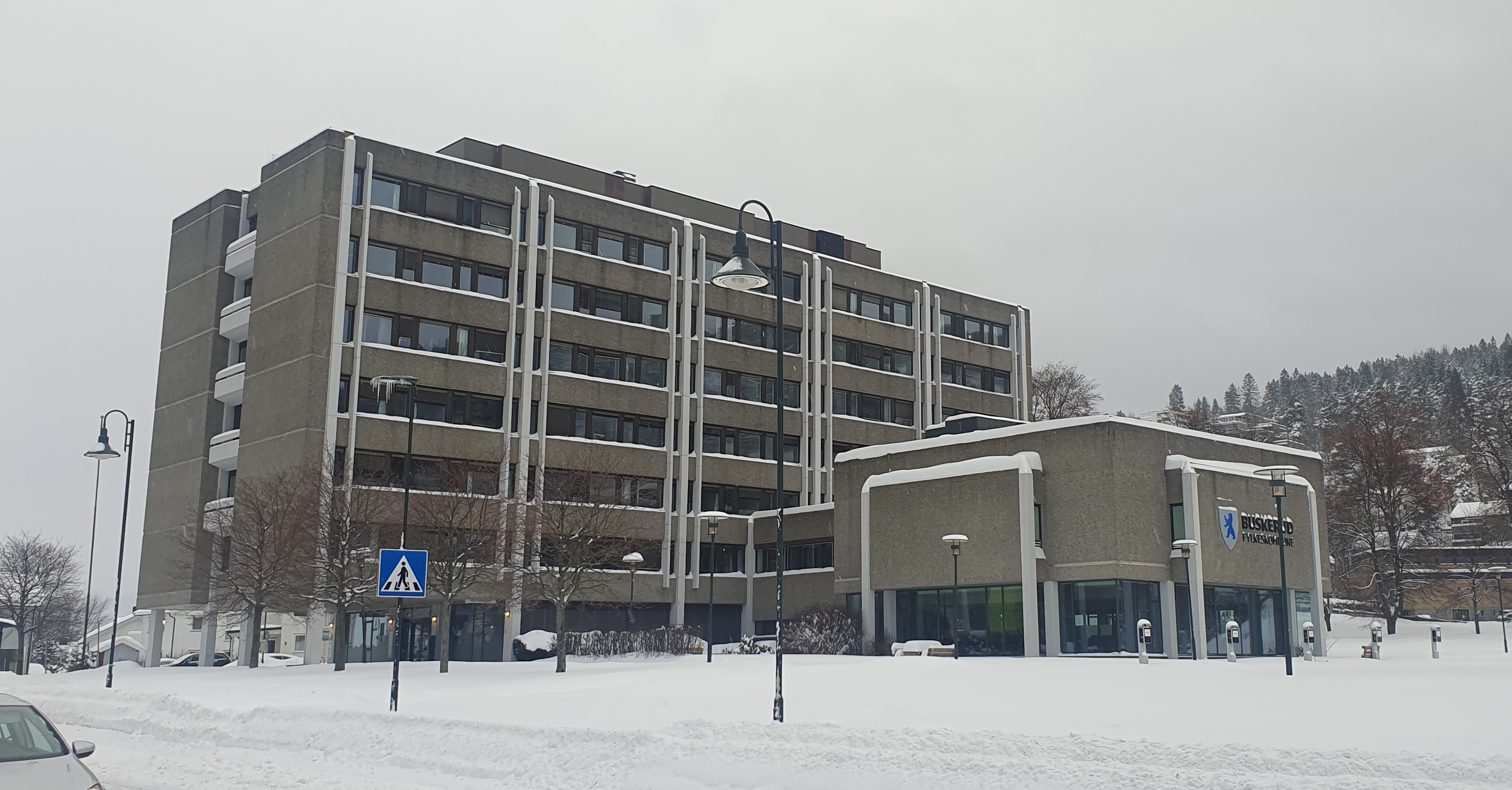
- Administrative office of the county municipality in Drammen

- Coat of arms

- Location in Norway
- Coordinates: 59°44′54.11″N 10°11′20.92″E
- Country: Norway
- Established: 1 January 1976
- Dissolved: 1 January 2020
- Re-established: 1 January 2024
- Administrative center: Drammen

Government
  - County mayor: Tore Opdal Hansen
- ISO 3166 code: NO-06
- Employees: 1,800
- Schools: 13
- Transit authority: Brakar

Buskerud County Municipality (Norwegian: Buskerud fylkeskommune) is the regional governing administration of Buskerud county in Norway. The county municipality was established in its most early form on 1 January 1976 when the law was changed to allow elected county councils in Norway. The county municipality was dissolved on 1 January 2020, when Buskerud was merged with the neighboring counties of Akershus and Østfold, creating the new Viken county which is led by the Viken County Municipality. Following a dissolution of Viken county on 1 January 2024, Buskerud was re-established as both a county and county municipality. The administrative seat is located in Drammen.

== County government ==
The county municipality's most important tasks include secondary education, recreation (sports and outdoor life), and cultural heritage. The county municipality is also responsible for all county roads (including ferry operations) and public transport (including school busses). The county municipality has further responsibility for regional land-use planning, business development, power production, and environmental management. The county also has responsibility for providing dental health services (in 2002, responsibility for hospitals and public medicine was transferred from the counties to the new regional health authorities).

=== County mayors ===
Since 1976, the county mayor (Norwegian: fylkesordfører) of Buskerud has been the political leader of the county and the chairperson of the county council. Prior to 1976, the County governor led the council which was made up of all of the mayors of the rural municipalities within the county. Here is a list of people who have held this position:

- 1976–1979: Arvid Berglind (Labour Party)
- 1980–1983: Arild Hiim (Conservative Party)
- 1984–1987: Åse Klundelien (Labour Party)
- 1988–1991: Hans Erik Riwen (Conservative Party)
- 1992–1999: Per Ulriksen (Labour Party)
- 1999–2007: Tor Ottar Karlsen (Labour Party)
- 2007–2011: Roger Ryberg (Labour Party)
- 2011–2015: Morten Eriksrød (Conservative Party)
- 2015–2019: Roger Ryberg (Labour Party)
- 2023–present: Tore Opdal Hansen (Conservative Party)

=== County council ===
The county council (Norwegian: Fylkestinget) is made up of 43 representatives that are elected by direct election by all legal residents of the county every fourth year. The council essentially acts as a parliament or legislative body for the county. The county council typically meets about six times a year. Council members are divided into standing committees and an executive committee (fylkesutvalg), which meet considerably more often. Both the council and executive committee (with at least 5 members) are led by the county mayor (Norwegian: fylkesordfører). The executive committee carries out the executive functions of the county under the direction of the whole council. The tables below show the current and historical composition of the council by political party.

Buskerud fylkesting 2023–2027
Party name (in Norwegian)	Number of representatives
Labour Party (Arbeiderpartiet)	10
Progress Party (Fremskrittspartiet)	6
Green Party (Miljøpartiet De Grønne)	2
Conservative Party (Høyre)	14
Industry and Business Party (Industri‑ og Næringspartiet)	2
Christian Democratic Party (Kristelig Folkeparti)	1
Pensioners' Party (Pensjonistpartiet)	1
Red Party (Rødt)	1
Centre Party (Senterpartiet)	5
Socialist Left Party (Sosialistisk Venstreparti)	2
Liberal Party (Venstre)	3
Total number of members:	47

Buskerud fylkesting 2015–2019
Party name (in Norwegian)	Number of representatives
Labour Party (Arbeiderpartiet)	15
Progress Party (Fremskrittspartiet)	5
Green Party (Miljøpartiet De Grønne)	2
Conservative Party (Høyre)	13
Christian Democratic Party (Kristelig Folkeparti)	1
Centre Party (Senterpartiet)	4
Socialist Left Party (Sosialistisk Venstreparti)	1
Liberal Party (Venstre)	2
Total number of members:	43

Buskerud fylkesting 2011–2015
Party name (in Norwegian)	Number of representatives
Labour Party (Arbeiderpartiet)	15
Progress Party (Fremskrittspartiet)	5
Conservative Party (Høyre)	15
Christian Democratic Party (Kristelig Folkeparti)	2
Centre Party (Senterpartiet)	3
Socialist Left Party (Sosialistisk Venstreparti)	1
Liberal Party (Venstre)	2
Total number of members:	43

Buskerud fylkesting 2007–2011
Party name (in Norwegian)	Number of representatives
Labour Party (Arbeiderpartiet)	15
Progress Party (Fremskrittspartiet)	8
Conservative Party (Høyre)	11
Christian Democratic Party (Kristelig Folkeparti)	2
Centre Party (Senterpartiet)	3
Socialist Left Party (Sosialistisk Venstreparti)	2
Liberal Party (Venstre)	2
Total number of members:	43

Buskerud fylkesting 2003–2007
Party name (in Norwegian)	Number of representatives
Labour Party (Arbeiderpartiet)	14
Progress Party (Fremskrittspartiet)	8
Conservative Party (Høyre)	10
Christian Democratic Party (Kristelig Folkeparti)	2
Centre Party (Senterpartiet)	3
Socialist Left Party (Sosialistisk Venstreparti)	5
Liberal Party (Venstre)	1
Total number of members:	43

Buskerud fylkesting 1999–2003
Party name (in Norwegian)	Number of representatives
Labour Party (Arbeiderpartiet)	19
Progress Party (Fremskrittspartiet)	7
Conservative Party (Høyre)	14
Christian Democratic Party (Kristelig Folkeparti)	4
Red Electoral Alliance (Rød Valgallianse)	1
Centre Party (Senterpartiet)	4
Socialist Left Party (Sosialistisk Venstreparti)	4
Liberal Party (Venstre)	2
Total number of members:	55

Buskerud fylkesting 1995–1999
Party name (in Norwegian)	Number of representatives
Labour Party (Arbeiderpartiet)	20
Progress Party (Fremskrittspartiet)	7
Conservative Party (Høyre)	13
Christian Democratic Party (Kristelig Folkeparti)	3
Centre Party (Senterpartiet)	6
Socialist Left Party (Sosialistisk Venstreparti)	3
Liberal Party (Venstre)	2
Buskerud Free County List (Buskerud Frie Fylkesliste)	1
Total number of members:	55

Buskerud fylkesting 1991–1995
Party name (in Norwegian)	Number of representatives
Labour Party (Arbeiderpartiet)	20
Progress Party (Fremskrittspartiet)	4
Conservative Party (Høyre)	13
Christian Democratic Party (Kristelig Folkeparti)	3
Pensioners' Party (Pensjonistpartiet)	1
Centre Party (Senterpartiet)	6
Socialist Left Party (Sosialistisk Venstreparti)	6
Liberal Party (Venstre)	2
Total number of members:	55

Buskerud fylkesting 1987–1991
Party name (in Norwegian)	Number of representatives
Labour Party (Arbeiderpartiet)	22
Progress Party (Fremskrittspartiet)	8
Conservative Party (Høyre)	14
Christian Democratic Party (Kristelig Folkeparti)	3
Centre Party (Senterpartiet)	4
Socialist Left Party (Sosialistisk Venstreparti)	2
Liberal Party (Venstre)	2
Total number of members:	55

Buskerud fylkesting 1983–1987
Party name (in Norwegian)	Number of representatives
Labour Party (Arbeiderpartiet)	25
Progress Party (Fremskrittspartiet)	3
Conservative Party (Høyre)	16
Christian Democratic Party (Kristelig Folkeparti)	3
Centre Party (Senterpartiet)	4
Socialist Left Party (Sosialistisk Venstreparti)	2
Liberal Party (Venstre)	2
Total number of members:	55

Buskerud fylkesting 1979–1983
Party name (in Norwegian)	Number of representatives
Labour Party (Arbeiderpartiet)	24
Progress Party (Fremskrittspartiet)	1
Conservative Party (Høyre)	17
Christian Democratic Party (Kristelig Folkeparti)	4
Centre Party (Senterpartiet)	5
Socialist Left Party (Sosialistisk Venstreparti)	2
Liberal Party (Venstre)	2
Total number of members:	55

Buskerud fylkesting 1976–1979
Party name (in Norwegian)	Number of representatives
Labour Party (Arbeiderpartiet)	26
Conservative Party (Høyre)	13
Christian Democratic Party (Kristelig Folkeparti)	5
Centre Party (Senterpartiet)	7
Socialist Left Party (Sosialistisk Venstreparti)	3
Liberal Party (Venstre)	1
Total number of members:	55
