= Arild Hiim =

Norwegian politician (1945–2024)

Arild Hiim (17 August 1945 – 8 December 2024) was a Norwegian politician for the Conservative Party.

== Life and career ==
Hiim was elected to the Norwegian Parliament from Buskerud in 1989, and was re-elected on one occasion. He had previously served in the position of deputy representative during the term 1985–1989.

Hiim was a member of Ringerike city council from 1971 to 1979. He then became mayor of Buskerud county, serving in 1979–1983. His successor Åse Klundelien was elected to the Parliament in 1989 as well.

Hiim died on 8 December 2024, at the age of 79.
