= Håøya, Akershus =

Island in Frogn, Akershus, Norway

Coordinates: 59.6969°N 10.5692°E

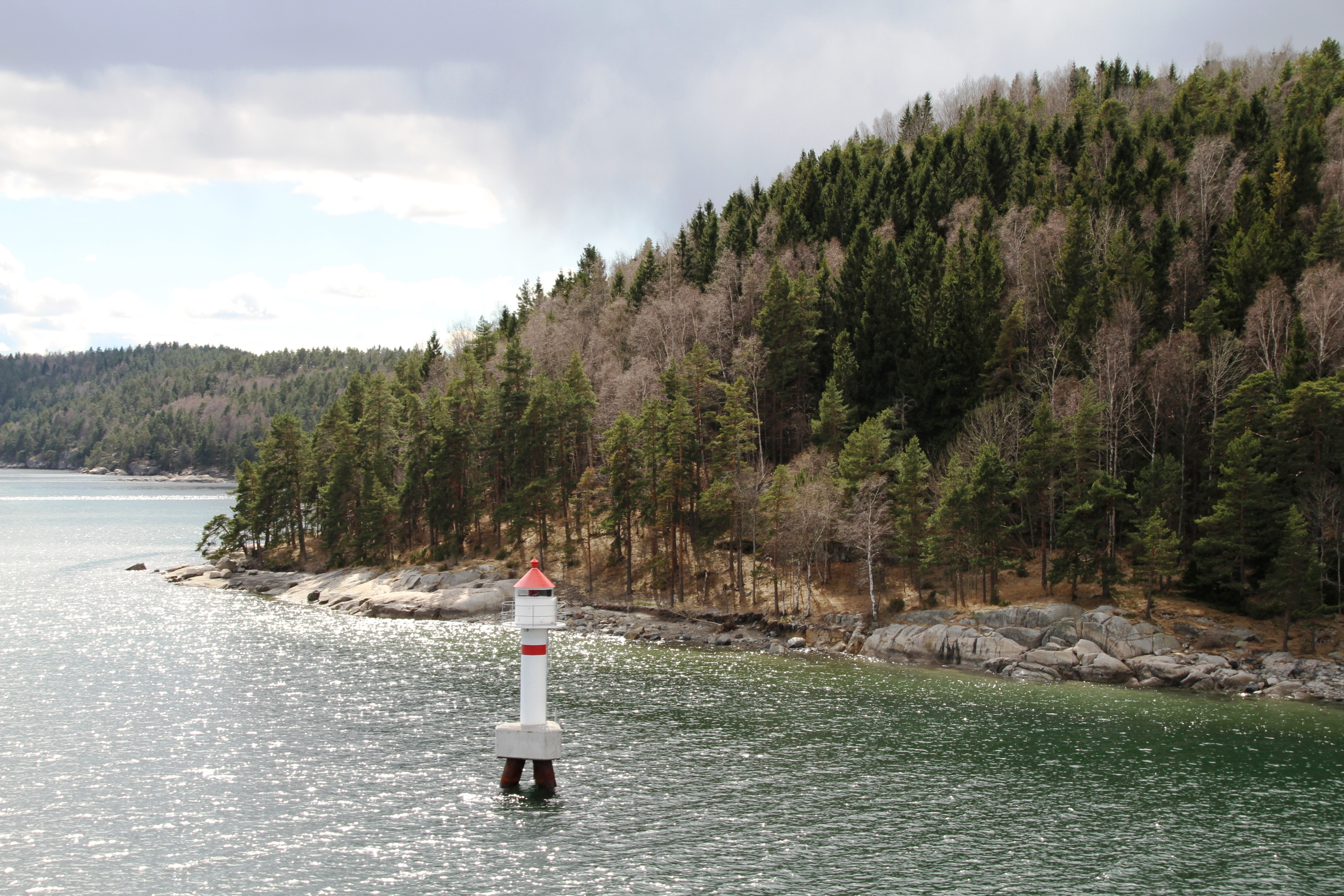
Image of the islands of northern Frogn municipality, in the middle of the Oslo Fjord, east Norway

Håøya is an island in Oslofjorden in Frogn municipality, Norway. Its area is 5.6 km², which makes it the largest island in Inner Oslo Fjord. It is located between Oscarsborg and Gråøya.

Søndre Håøya is a nature reserve area. White-tailed eagles nest on the southeastern part of the island. They returned in 2008 after an absence of 126 years. Visitors are permitted to harvest mushrooms and berries under 'freedom to roam' but other plants and flowers are protected. Goats graze the island during the summer.

The island has a mooring jetty, camping areas, swimming beaches, public toilets, cabins for rent, and historic bunkers and buildings. The island was part of the defense of Oslo, along with Oscarsborg Fortress.

== See also ==
- Drøbak Sound
- Oscarsborg Fortress
- Oslofjord
