= Frogn =

Frogn Municipality Frogn kommune
- Municipality
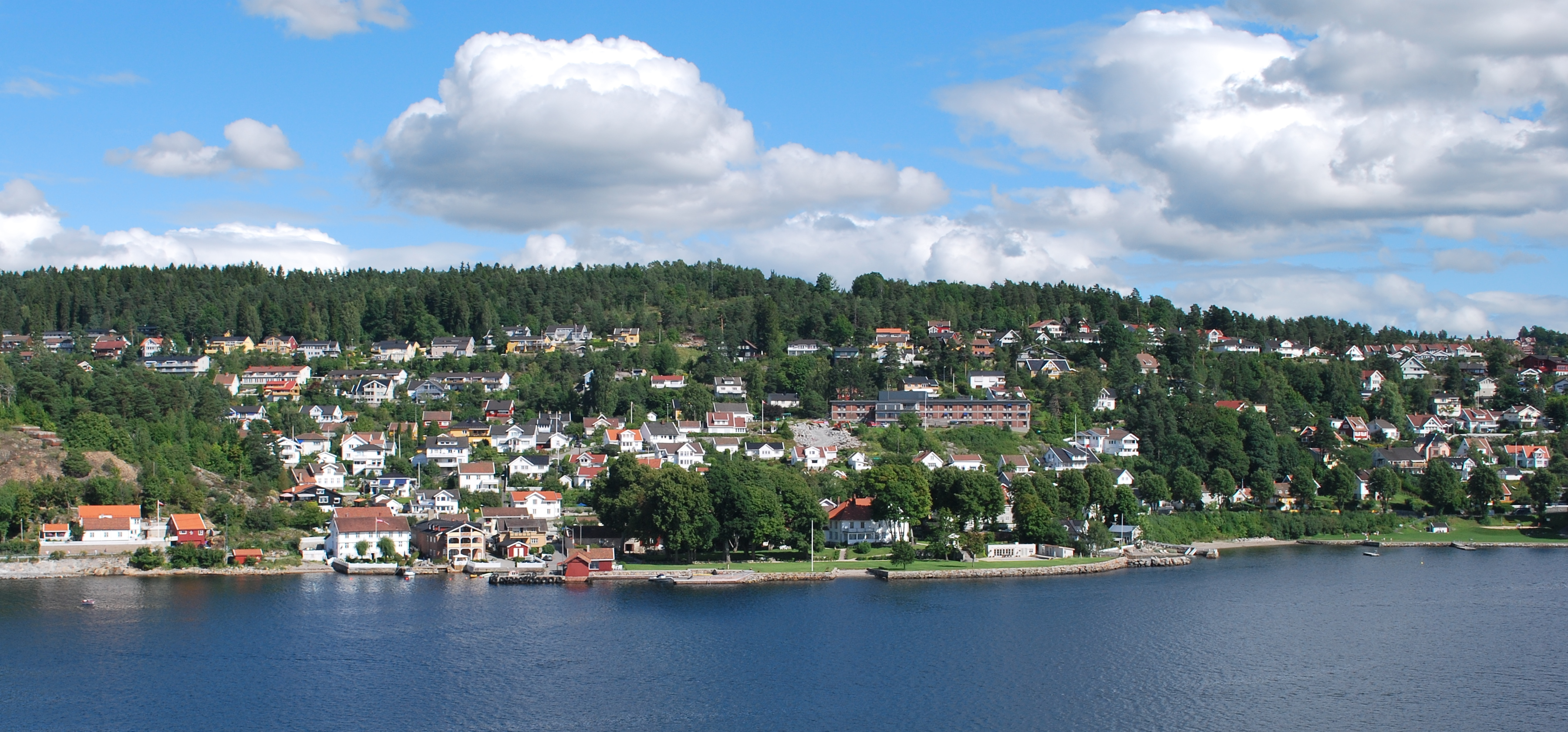

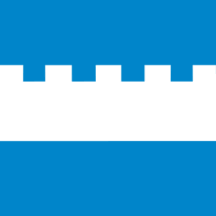
- Flag Coat of arms

- Akershus within Norway

- Frogn within Akershus
- Coordinates: 59°41′56″N 10°39′19″E
- Country: Norway
- County: Akershus
- District: Follo
- Administrative centre: Drøbak

Government
  - Mayor (2023): Sigbjørn Odden (Høyre)

Area
  - Total: 86 km^{2} (33 sq mi)
  - Land: 85 km^{2} (33 sq mi)
  - Rank: #395 in Norway

Population (2020)
  - Total: 15,959
  - Rank: #81 in Norway
  - Density: 188/km^{2} (490/sq mi)
  - Change (10 years): ▲ +9.14%
- Demonym: Frognsokning

Official language
  - Norwegian form: Bokmål
- Time zone: UTC+01:00 (CET)
  - Summer (DST): UTC+02:00 (CEST)
- ISO 3166 code: NO-3214
- Website: Official website

Frogn is a municipality in Akershus county, Norway. It is part of the Follo traditional region. The administrative centre of the municipality is the town of Drøbak. Frogn was established as a municipality on 1 January 1838 (see formannskapsdistrikt). The city of Drøbak was merged with Frogn on 1 January 1962.

Frogn is located at the southern part of the peninsula between the main Oslofjord and Bunnefjorden. It borders Nesodden, Ås, Vestby and Asker.

== General information ==
=== Name ===
The municipality (originally the parish) is named after the old Frogn farm (Old Norse: Fraun), since the first church was built here. The name must be very old and the meaning is unknown. One theory is that it is derived from the Norse word frauð which means "manure" and the meaning would then be "the fertilized field" (see also Frogner and Tøyen).

Prior to 1889, the name was written "Fron". Between 1837 and 1865, the name of the municipality was Drøbak landdistrikt.

=== Coat-of-arms ===
The coat-of-arms is from modern times. They were granted on 20 May 1988. The arms symbolize the Oscarsborg Fortress in silver on a blue background. The fortress is on the Drøbaksund in the Oslofjord in the municipality. The fortress was built in the late 19th century and played a major role in the defence of Norway in the beginning of World War II.

Number of minorities (1st and 2nd generation) in Frogn by country of origin in 2017
Ancestry	Number
Poland	208
Sweden	196
Denmark	131
Lithuania	110
Germany	94
India	89
Somalia	82
United Kingdom	64
Philippines	55
Eritrea	49

== Notable people ==
- Niels Carlsen (1734 in Drøbak – 1809) a timber merchant, landowner, shipowner and banker
- Jens Carl Peter Brandt (1848 in Frogn – 1912) lawyer, property owner and Mayor of Frogn, 1884 to 1895
- Carl Julius Evensen (1851 in Drøbak – 1937) a Norwegian shipmaster and Antarctic explorer
- Håkon Anton Fagerås (born 1975 in Drøbak) a Norwegian sculptor
- Gunnar Isachsen (1868 in Drøbak – 1939) a Norwegian military officer and polar scientist
- Louise Isachsen (1875 in Drøbak – 1932) a physician, Norway's first female surgeon
- Per Deberitz (1880 in Drøbak – 1945) a Norwegian neo-impressionist painter
- Viggo Brun (1885–1978 in Drøbak) a professor, mathematician and number theorist
- Noralv Teigen (1932 – 2017 in Drøbak) an actor, theatre instructor and theatre director
- Øystein Øystå (1934–2014) a Norwegian writer and long-jumper, lived in Drøbak
- Olav Skjevesland (1942 in Drøbak – 2019) theologian, Bishop of Agder og Telemark
- Martin Schanche (born 1945) former racing driver, now aspiring politician, lives in Drøbak
- Terje Mikkelsen (born 1957 in Drøbak) a Norwegian conductor
- Solveig Kringlebotn (born 1963 in Drøbak) Norwegian operatic soprano
- Sven Ombudstvedt (born 1966) a businessperson, CEO of Norske Skog, lives in Drøbak
- Arifur Rahman (born 1984) a Bangladeshi-Norwegian political cartoonist, illustrator and animator; lives in Drøbak

=== Sport ===
- Gunnar Andersen (1890 in Drøbak – 1968) a footballer with 46 caps for Norway and ski jumper
- Tore Johannessen (1922–2005) an ice hockey referee, lived in Drøbak
- Pål Trulsen (born 1962) a curler, team gold medallist at 2002 Winter Olympics
- Anders Pedersen (sailor) (born 1991), is a Norwegian competitive sailor.
- Andrine Tomter (born 1995) a footballer with 170 club caps and 16 with Norway women
- Oliver Valaker Edvardsen (born 1999) a footballer playing for AFC Ajax grew up in Drøbak

== International relations ==
=== Twin towns — Sister cities ===
The following cities are twinned with Frogn:

- - Åmål, Västra Götaland County, Sweden
- - Loimaa, Länsi-Suomi, Finland
- - Türi, Järva County, Estonia
- - Grenå, Djursland, Denmark
- - Berlin, Mitte, Germany
