= Arctowski =

Arctowski may refer to:

- Henryk Arctowski (1871–1958), Polish scientist and explorer
- Arctowski Medal
- Arctowski Dome
- Arctowski Cove
- Arctowski Peninsula
- Arctowski Nunatak
- Arctowski Peak
- Henryk Arctowski Polish Antarctic Station
