= Åkerlundh Nunatak =

Nunatak in Graham Land, Antarctica

- Location within Antarctica

Highest point
- Coordinates: 65°4′S 60°10′W

Geography
- Location: Antarctic Peninsula
- Continent: Antarctica
- Region: West Antarctica

Åkerlundh Nunatak is a nunatak which lies 2 miles (3 km) northwest of Donald Nunatak between Bruce Nunatak and Murdoch Nunatak in the Seal Nunataks group, off the east coast of Antarctic Peninsula. It was charted in 1947 by the Falkland Islands Dependencies Survey, who named it for Gustaf Åkerlundh, a member of the Swedish Antarctic Expedition, 1901–04.
