= Bauker =

Bauker is a former farm residence of a Gausdal Military Company captain between 1791 and 1864. Located in what is now Gausdal Municipality in Norway, the main building of the estate was listed as a National Heritage by the Norwegian state in 1923.

== History ==
Bauker as a dwelling originates from the Middle Ages; however, as the Black Death plague spread across Norway in middle 14th century it became disused and eventually was taken over by the church.

In 1791, the Bauker mansion was built for the Gausdal Military Company and became the residence for their captain, Peter Christian Ring. The captain enlarged the main house in 1822. In 1864, the manor ceased to be the Captain's residence when the Norwegian state sold it to vicar Bernt Anker Leigh Knudtssøn, married to Anna Coucheron.

From 1876 to 1960 Bauker was run as a tourist inn, at some time part-owned by Liv Coucheron-Torp Heyerdahl Rockefeller and run by Pella Knudtssøn. The main building was renovated in 1887 to include 6 guestrooms, while the annexes "Grande" and "Arken" were later raised, eventually making Bauker able to accommodate 70 guests. "Grande" was originally the first elementary school for the local neighborhood, built in 1848, known as "Myra Skole".

Bjørnstjerne Bjørnson (famous Norwegian poet and Nobel prize winner) used Bauker as a "relief housing" for both guests and family that visited his mansion Aulestad, a few kilometers down the road. His present to Bauker for this privilege was a chandelier, which unfortunately followed a later owner to Sweden.

"Grande" was sold in 1896 for kr. 500,- to Jacob Knudsøn. However, four years later, it was taken down and was rebuilt as part of the Bauker building.

Bauker's main building has been listed as a National Heritage by the Norwegian state as early as 1923.

The estate also includes two stabbur, one dating from 1756, the other from 1865. In 1960, the farming and tourist businesses were separated.

Many years later, Benedicte and Harald Thiis used Bauker when they started Mandala Centre, Norway's "headquarters for humanistic and transpersonal psychology". Also called a centre for "Unity and Inner Growth", the place functioned as a "university" for teaching alternative forms of treatment and new spirituality. Psychodrama, massage, alternative medicine, yoga and dance were some of the teaching topics. Later, Bauker became the spiritual centre for the Norwegian Baháʼí Faith movement.

The Thiis family sold the estate in 1993. For several years the new owner and the Commune of Gausdal used the buildings as housing for political refugees. However, after a fire burnt down the "Arken" building in 2003, the estate's inhabitants had to move and the historical buildings were once more used for overnight stays and exclusive arrangements. In 2005 the manor was sold again.

== Significance in art ==
Bauker was used as an artist's colony before World War II. Known Norwegian artists such as Oluf Wold-Thorne, Thorvald Erichsen, Per Deberitz, Einar Sandberg, Severin Grande, Henrik Sørensen, Alf Lundeby, Arnstein Arneberg, Clara Tschudi and Sigurd Hoel stayed here from time to time.

Bauker is located in the middle of the "Spiritual Hamlet" (free translation of "Åndsreppen") where many artists had been living in the early 20th century. The poet Inge Krokann, the composer Sparre Olsen, the painter Hallvard Blekastad and the writer Milada Blekastad, who all settled in the hamlet, are the originators of the "Spiritual Hamlet" concept.

According to Ivar B. Blekastad, it is said that the writer Jonas Lie used Bauker as the setting for his most famous novel, "The family at Gilje", released in 1883 (translated to English in 1920).
