= Øystein Øystå =

Norwegian writer (1934–2014)

Øystein Øystå, né Anderssen (25 October 1934 – 12 April 2014) was a Norwegian writer.

He was the information director of the Norwegian Brewers and Soft Drinks Producers from 1970 to 1992, then a freelance writer. He has written many books on breweries in Norway, as well as a local historical book for Frogn Municipality and other cultural history topics. He has also written 17 articles in the biographical encyclopedia Norsk biografisk leksikon. Since 1997 he edited the magazine Rotary Norden, and he holds the Paul Harris Fellow recognition from Rotary.

He resided in Drøbak and has contributed extensively to the local revue scene, and founded the gallery Avistegnernes Hus. During his younger days he was an able long jumper, with a personal best of 7.01 metres (23.0 ft), achieved in August 1957 in Tvedestrand. He died in April 2014.
