= Base Aérea Teniente Benjamín Matienzo =

Matienzo Base Base Aérea Teniente Benjamín Matienzo Base Matienzo Estación Matienzo
- Antarctic base
- Lieutenant Benjamín Matienzo; Air Base
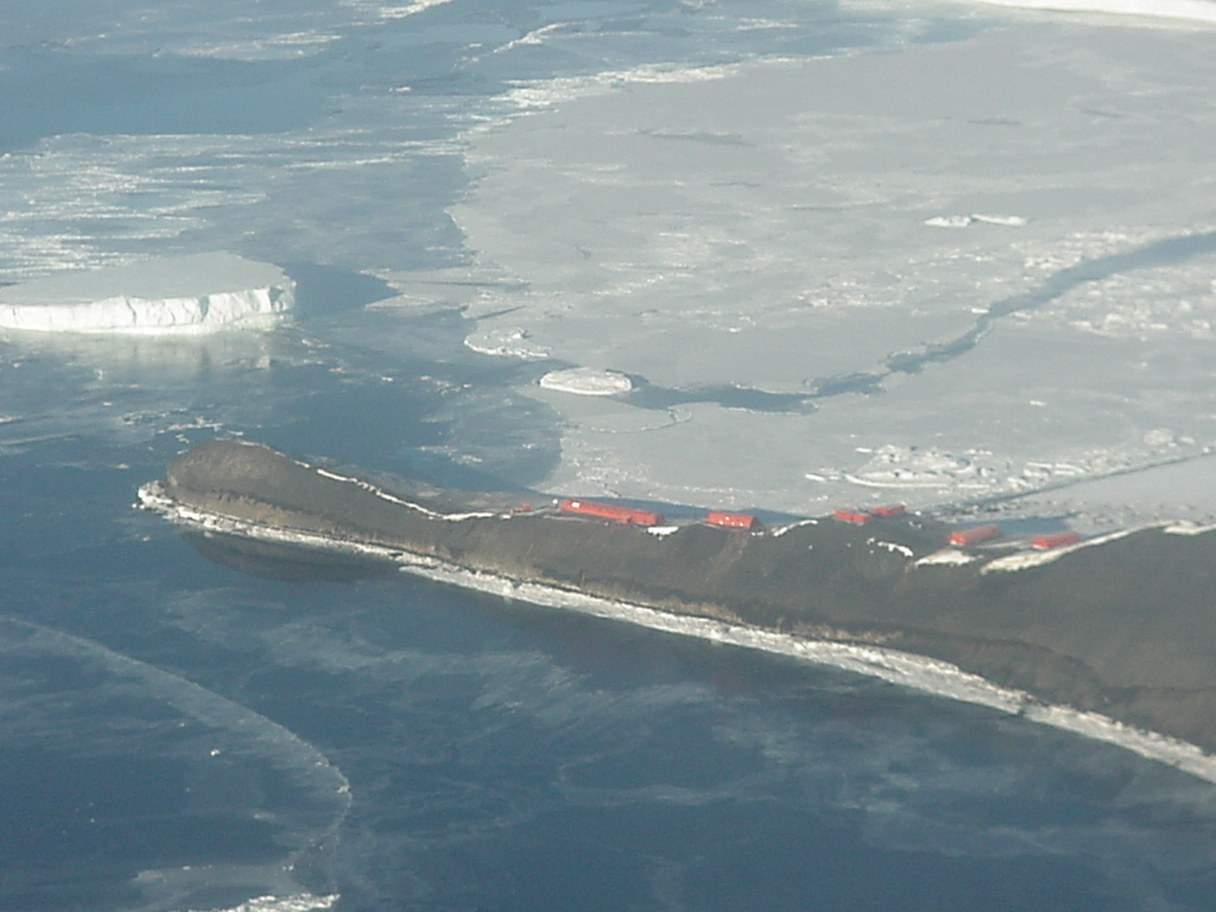
- Matienzo from the air, austral autumn of 2009

- Location within Antarctica
- Coordinates: 64°58′32″S 60°04′17″W
- Country: Argentina
- Province: Tierra del Fuego, Antarctica, and South Atlantic Islands Province
- Department: Antártida Argentina
- Region: Graham Land; Antarctic Peninsula
- Location: Larsen Nunatak; Foca Nunataks
- Founded: March 15, 1961 (1960–61 austral summer season)
- Named for: Benjamín Matienzo

Government
  - Type: Directorate
  - Body: Dirección Nacional del Antártico
  - Operator: Instituto Antártico Argentino
- Elevation: 32 m (105 ft)

Population (2017)
  - Summer: 12
  - Winter: 0
- Time zone: UTC-3 (ART)
- Type: Seasonal
- Period: Summer
- Status: Operational
- Activities: List: Meteorology; Geology; Geophysics; Oceanography; Climatology
- Facilities: List: Main house; Emergency house; Airstrip; Helipad; Fuel platform; Waste treatment plant; Laboratory; Freezing chamber; Warehouse and deposits

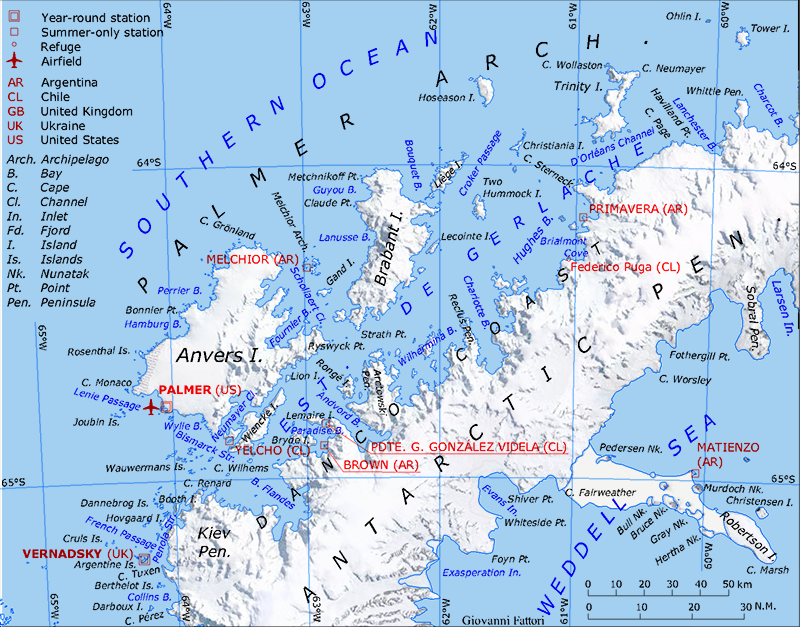
Map showing Matienzo station to the bottom right, Cartographic base: Antarctic Digital Database www.add.scar.org/

Matienzo Base (Spanish: Base Aérea Teniente Benjamín Matienzo, or more often Base Matienzo or Estación Matienzo) is an Argentine Antarctic base and scientific research station named after Lieutenant Benjamín Matienzo, an Argentine aviation pioneer. It is located in Larsen Nunatak, one of the Foca Nunataks, in Graham Land, Antarctic Peninsula.

As of 2014 Matienzo is one of 13 research bases in Antarctica operated by Argentina. From 1961 to 1985 it served as a permanent base; since then it is open during the summer season only.

== History ==
Matienzo was founded as Lieutenant Matienzo Joint Base (Spanish: Base Conjunta Teniente Matienzo) on 15 March 1961 as a joint effort between the Argentine Army and the Argentine Air Force. Under the command of then Captain Ignacio Carro, several aircraft and tracked vehicles were employed to transport more than 240 t (240 long tons; 260 short tons) of cargo from Esperanza.

At the end of 1962 Matienzo was the launch site for the first major Air Force operation in the Antarctic. In what was called Operación Sur ("Operation South"), a Douglas C-47 (TA-33) commanded by then Captain Mario Luis Olezza took off from the base trying to reach the South Pole and then land on McMurdo Station. This first attempt failed due to a fire in the airplane's engines. The plan could only materialize in 1965.

On 15 November 1963 the base was transferred under exclusive command of the Air Force, and renamed as Destacamento Aeronáutico Teniente Matienzo ("Lieutenant Matienzo Aeronautical Detachment"), The Air Force kept a number of planes for exclusive service of the base.

During 1964 an extensive program of meteorological and climatological observations was fulfilled: it included studying the glaciological profile across the Matienzo–Esperanza route and the coastal channel route between the Robertson Island and the 72° 30' S position. Also, topographic and aerial photographic surveys of the Larsen Ice Shelf were made.

In 1965 two Gamma Centauro sounding rockets developed by the Argentine Air Force and two high altitude balloons carrying instruments for x-ray measurements where launched from the base, under collaboration with the University of Tucumán and the Instituto de Investigaciones Aeronáuticas y Espaciales. That year the base name was changed to the present one.

On 29 July 1968 a Beaver P-05 took off from Matienzo with the mission of assisting a critically ill medical patient in the British Base "F" on the Argentine Islands. Amidst very bad weather, the aircraft crashed without casualties and the evacuation had to be delayed until the icebreaker ARA General San Martín could finally take over and succeed with the mission.

Matienzo stayed closed through the 1972–1973 campaign, and was reopened on 8 September 1974; it was closed again for the 1984–1985 campaign and reopened once again, although it has been a summer-only base ever since.

== Description ==
As of 2008 Matienzo is composed of 6 buildings and includes facilities such as: main and emergency houses, airstrip, helipad, fuel platform, central power station with two Antarctic gas oil generators, waste treatment plant, laboratory, freezing chamber, a warehouse and several deposits. The 1,500 m (4,900 ft) long airstrip is located over a nearby glacier 2 km (1.2 mi) away, and is usable by all kind of ski-mounting aircraft. The snow-covered helipad is 1,500 m (4,900 ft) south from the base; several Bell 212 helicopters are used for deployment and supply of scientific personnel. Matienzo also has a basic 15 m^{2} (160 sq ft) infirmary attended by a paramedic.

Periodically a Twin Otter aircraft deals with the transfer of personnel and cargo, as well as waste evacuation. The base actively manages preservation and restoration of the surrounding environment; garbage and waste is removed, concentrated, classified, packaged and compacted for later disposal in the Argentine mainland.

=== Scientific activity ===
Scientists at Matienzo carry out meteorological, ionospheric, oceanographic and snow science observations; they perform aerial photographic surveys and studies on geology and geophysics involving high precision gravity and magnetism measurements.

Scientific and technical staff of the Argentine Antarctic Institute uses part of its facilities for winter–spring activities. The base is the launching point for expeditions to the Larsen Ice Shelf and Jason Peninsula. Staff of the National Meteorological Service commissioned at Matienzo keeps track of the masses of ice, solar radiation and atmospheric parameters.

Retreat and collapse of the Larsen Ice Shelf is constantly monitored by analyzing satellite imagery, GPS positioning and terrain data to investigate the ice-climate interactions in critical areas under climate change conditions.

== Climate ==
The median annual temperature at the base is −11.6 °C (11.1 °F); the highest temperature ever recorded was 13.1 °C (55.6 °F) on 16 March 1965, and the lowest, −44.4 °C (−47.9 °F) on 5 August 1964.

== See also ==
- Research stations in Antarctica
- List of Antarctic field camps
- Argentine Antarctica
