= Reidar =

Reidar is a Scandinavian male given name of Old Norse origins. As of 2013, there are 6,850 people with this name in Norway, 1,519 in Sweden and 108 in Finland. In Estonia there are 5 Reidars and in Italy there's only one. The namesday is July 28 in Norway and May 9 in Sweden. The name Reidar, "hreidr" + "arr" means home and warrior.

== Notable people ==
- Reidar Alveberg (1916–2004), Norwegian bobsledder
- Reidar Andersen, Norwegian ski jumper
- Reidar Åsgård, Norwegian politician
- Reidar Aulie, Norwegian artist
- Reidar Berg, Norwegian bobsledder
- Reidar Børjeson, Norwegian figure skater
- Reidar Carlsen, Norwegian politician
- Reidar Eide, Norwegian motorcyclist
- Reidar Finsrud, Norwegian artist
- Reidar Hirsti, Norwegian editor and politician
- Reidar Hjermstad, Norwegian cross country skier
- Reidar Holter, Norwegian rower
- Reidar Horghagen, Norwegian drummer, also known as Horgh
- Reidar Johansen, Norwegian politician
- Reidar Jørgensen, Norwegian runner and botanist
- Reidar Kjellberg, Norwegian art historian and museum director
- Reidar Kvammen, Norwegian footballer
- Reidar T. Larsen, Norwegian politician
- Reidar Liaklev, Norwegian speed skater
- Reidar Lorentzen, Norwegian javelin thrower
- Reidar Martiniuson, Norwegian sailor
- Reidar Merli, Norwegian wrestler
- Reidar Ødegaard, Norwegian cross country skier
- Reidar Omang, Norwegian historian, librarian and archivist
- Reidar Raaen, Norwegian cyclist
- Reidar Särestöniemi, Finnish painter
- Reidar Skår, Norwegian musician
- Reidar Sørensen, Norwegian actor
- Reidar Strømdahl, Norwegian politician
- Reidar Tønsberg, Norwegian gymnast

=== Fictional characters ===
- Reidar Dahlén, the main character of the Swedish TV series Rederiet
- Reidar Vincent Tollefsen, a Norwegian teenager growing up in the late 1980s, portrayed by comedian and actor Øivind Blunck
