= Dallmann Nunatak =

Nunatak in Graham Land, Antarctica

Dallmann Nunatak (65°1′S 60°18′W) is a nunatak 5 nautical miles (9 km) north of Bruce Nunatak in the Seal Nunataks group, off the east coast of the Antarctic Peninsula. It was first charted in 1902 by the Swedish Antarctic Expedition under Otto Nordenskiöld, and named by him for Captain Eduard Dallmann.
