= Bull Nunatak =

Nunatak in Graham Land, Antarctica

Bull Nunatak (65°5′S 60°23′W) is a nunatak which lies 3 nautical miles (6 km) west of Bruce Nunatak in the Seal Nunataks group, off the east coast of the Antarctic Peninsula. It was first charted in 1902 by the Swedish Antarctic Expedition under Otto Nordenskiöld, and named by him for Henrik Johan Bull, leader with Captain Leonard Kristensen of a Norwegian expedition to the Antarctic, 1894–95.
