= Larsen Nunatak =

Island nunatak in Graham Land, Antarctica

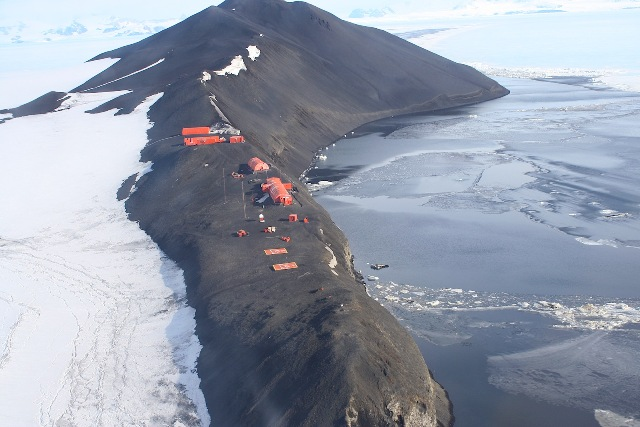
- Interactive map of Larsen Nunatak

Larsen Nunatak (64°58′S 60°4′W) is an island called nunatak 2 nautical miles (4 km) north of Murdoch Nunatak in the Seal Nunataks group, off the east coast of the Antarctic Peninsula. The Seal Nunataks were discovered by a Norwegian whaling expedition under C.A. Larsen in December 1893, and commemoration of Larsen was proposed by Ludwig Friederichsen in 1895. The application of this name is based upon a 1947 survey by the Falkland Islands Dependencies Survey.
