= Gray Nunatak =

Nunatak in Graham Land, Antarctica

Gray Nunatak (65°6′S 60°5′W) is a nunatak which lies 1.5 nautical miles (3 km) west of Arctowski Nunatak in the Seal Nunataks group, off the east coast of the Antarctic Peninsula. It was first charted by the Swedish Antarctic Expedition under Otto Nordenskiöld during a sledge journey in 1902, and named by him probably for Captain David Gray, a whaling skipper of Peterhead, Scotland. Gray had planned an expedition to the Weddell Sea in 1891 but the plan was abandoned due to a lack of funds.
