= HNoMS Tyr (N50) =

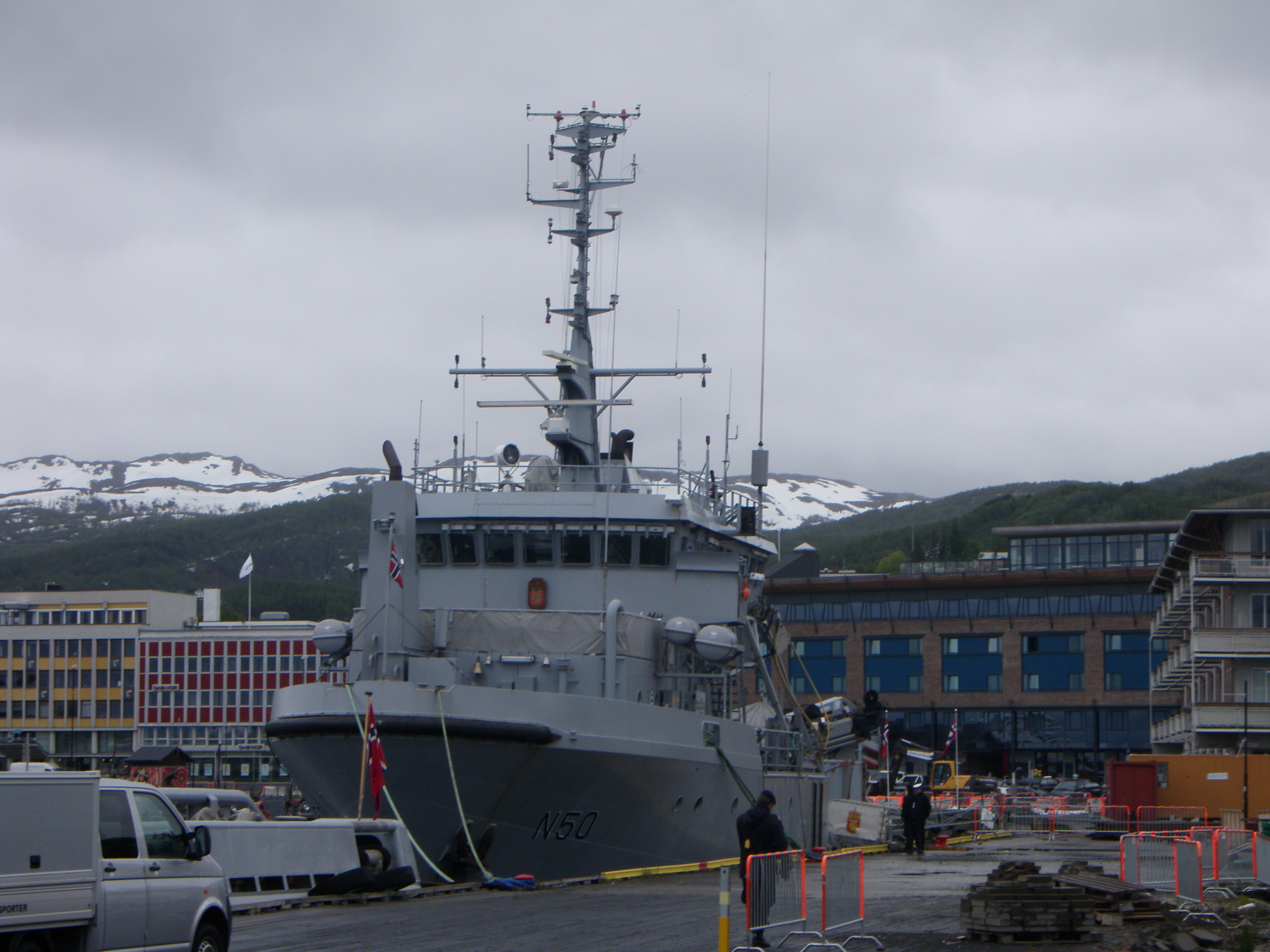
- Tyr in Harstad in June 2011.

History

Norway
- Name: HNoMS Tyr
- Namesake: Norse god Týr
- Builder: Voldnes Skipsverft, Fosnavåg (31)
- Laid down: 23 January 1981
- Launched: 23 May 1981
- Completed: August 1981
- Commissioned: 7 March 1995
- Decommissioned: August 2014
- Identification: Pennant number N50; IMO number: 8019409; MMSI number: 244170283; Callsign: PCDE
- Fate: Sold to Idefix Danmark ApS, Hobro. Renamed IDEFIX.Sold to Pelorus Yachting, Renamed PolarXplorer

General characteristics
- Displacement: 735 tons full load
- Length: 42.5 m (139.4 ft)
- Beam: 10 m (32.8 ft)
- Draught: 6.5 m (21.3 ft)
- Ice class: 1A
- Propulsion: Two x Deutch BA 12M816
- Speed: 18 knots (33.3 km/h)
- Range: 17,000 nautical miles
- Complement: 20
- Armament: M2HB MG

HNoMS Tyr was a mine control vessel used for underwater search and recovery by the Royal Norwegian Navy. It was decommissioned in 2014 and sold to private owners.

== History ==
Tyr was built at Voldnes Skipsverft in 1981 and was used as an offshore standby-ship in the North Sea under the name MS Standby Master, yard number 31. The Royal Norwegian Navy took her over in December 1993, and Tyr went through a comprehensive rebuilding and modernization program between 1994 and February 1995 at the Mjellem & Karlsen shipyard in Bergen. Under the rebuilding Tyr was equipped with new thrusters, the bridge was expanded and a mine hangar was built on the aft-deck, and new hydraulic equipment was installed on the work-deck. Tyr was fitted with tactical systems, and was equipped with a Scorpio ROV. The furnishings were also modernized.

In 2014, Tyr was put up for sale by the Norwegian Armed Forces, with an estimated price of 15-20 million kr.

Sold to Idefix Danmark ApS, Hobro. Renamed IDEFIX, August 2014.

== Wreck discoveries and recoveries ==
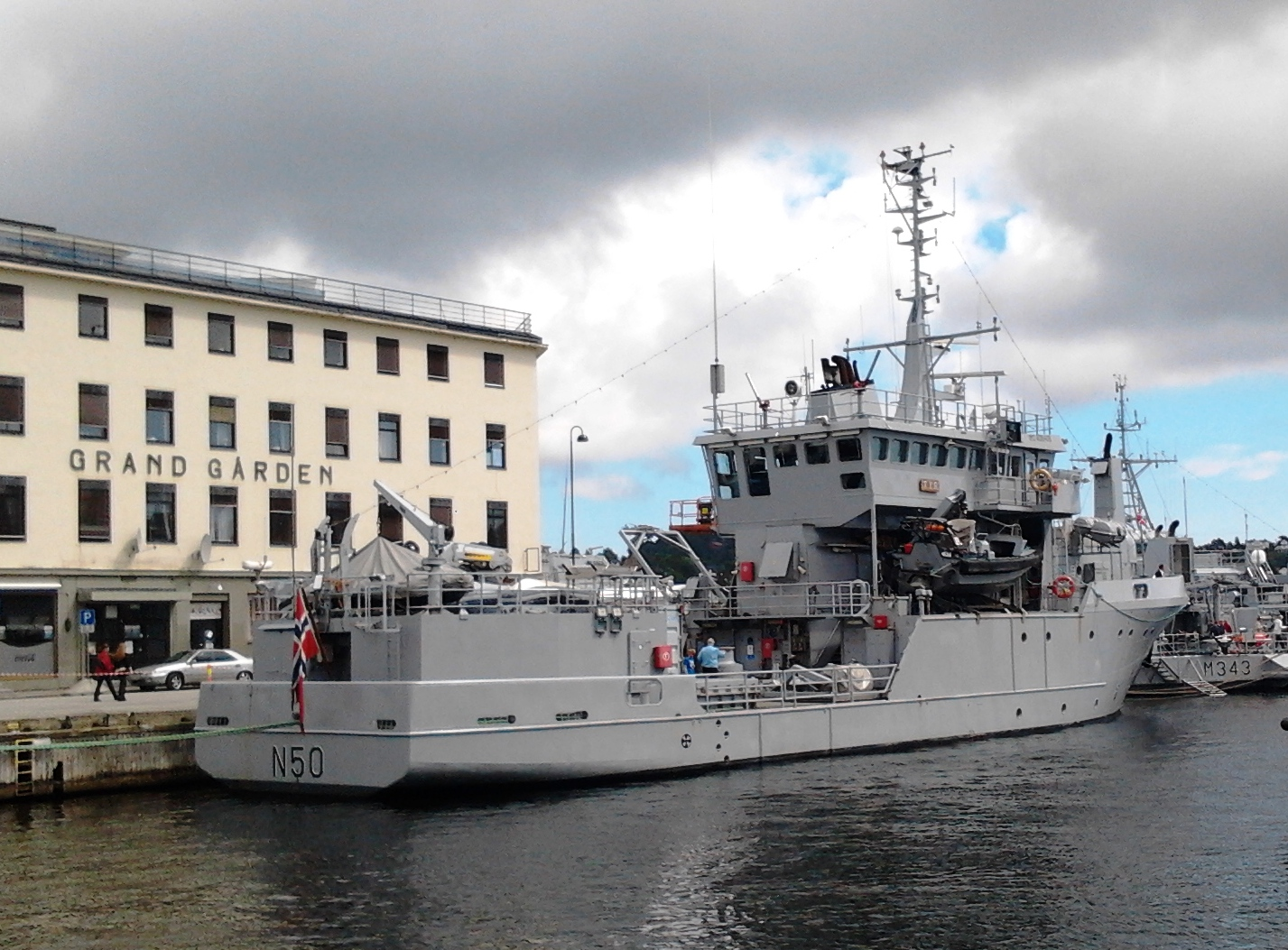
Tyr in Arendal in June 2012

HNoMS Tyr has discovered and/or recovered several wrecks:

- Localization and filming of the German battleship Scharnhorst in cooperation with the Norwegian Broadcasting Corporation.
- Localization and filming of the German submarine U-864, sunk west of Fedje in 1945.
- Localization and filming of the German submarine U-735, sunk near Horten in the Second World War.
- Localization and filming of the Polish troop-transport ship Chrobry, sunk in the Vestfjorden in 1940.
- Localization and filming of the Norwegian coastal express ship SS Prinsesse Ragnhild, sunk off Bodø on 23 October 1940.
- Localization and filming of the Royal Navy destroyer Hunter sunk on 10 April 1940 during the Battles of Narvik
- Localization of the German prisoner transport ship Palatia, sunk in the Second World War. This is the second largest ship disaster in Norwegian history.
- Relocalization of the Norwegian submarine Uredd, sunk on 24 February 1943 after hitting a German minefield.
- Localization and recovery of a Norwegian F-16 fighter jet, which had crashed in Bindalsfjorden, May 1997.
- Localization and recovery of a Norwegian F-16 fighter jet, which had crashed in the sea off Landegode in Bodø.
- Search localization of assumed deceased, after the Sleipner disaster.
- Search and recovery of both helicopter and the deceased after a helicopter crashed in the Førdefjorden in October 1996.
