= Arctowski Nunatak =

Nunatak in Graham Land, Antarctica

- Location within Antarctica

Naming
- Etymology: Henryk Arctowski, Polish geologist, oceanographer, and meteorologist

Geography
- Continent: Antarctica
- Area: Graham Land
- Range coordinates: 65°6′S 60°0′W

Climbing
- First ascent: Swedish Antarctic Expedition (1902)

Arctowski Nunatak is a nunatak 2 miles (3 km) northwest of Hertha Nunatak in the Seal Nunataks group, off the east coast of the Antarctic Peninsula. It was charted by the Swedish Antarctic Expedition under Otto Nordenskjöld during a sledge journey in 1902, and named by him for Henryk Arctowski, Polish geologist, oceanographer, and meteorologist of the Belgian Antarctic Expedition, 1897–99.
