= MS Palatia =

German cargo liner

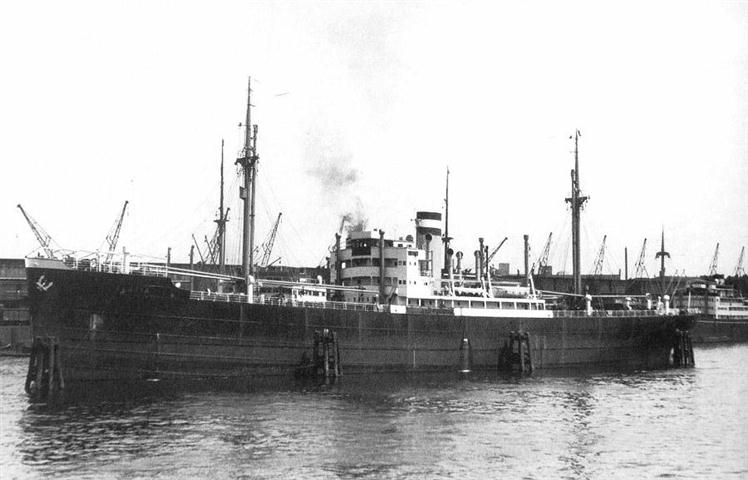
- Palatia

History
- Name: 1928–40: Palatia; 1940–41: Khasan; 1941–42: Palatia
- Owner: Hamburg America Line (1928–40); Soviet Union (1940–41); Kriegsmarine (1941–42)
- Port of registry: (Weimar Republic) Hamburg (1928–33); (Nazi Germany) Hamburg (1933–40); Soviet Union (1940–41); Nazi Germany (1941–42)
- Route: Hamburg – New York
- Builder: Schiffswerft H. Koch A.G. in Lübeck
- Yard number: 273
- Launched: 26 May 1928
- Identification: code letters: RHBJ (1928–33); call sign: DIEI (1934–42)
- Fate: Sunk by No. 489 Squadron RNZAF; torpedo bomber 21 October 1942

General characteristics
- Type: Cargo liner (1928–41); Naval transport ship (1941–42)
- Tonnage: 3,979 GRT, 2,280 NRT
- Length: 114.0 m (374.0 ft)
- Beam: 16.4 m (53.7 ft)
- Draught: 6.9 m (22.6 ft)
- Installed power: 1,709 NHP
- Propulsion: 6-cylinder double-acting two-stroke diesel engine
- Speed: 12 knots (22 km/h)

MS Palatia was a German cargo liner, built in 1928. After serving for several years on the Hamburg America Line's route to the Caribbean, she was sold to the Soviet Union in 1940. Following the outbreak of war between Nazi Germany and the Soviet Union in June 1941, she was captured by the Germans and pressed into Kriegsmarine service.

She was sunk on 21 October 1942 by a Royal New Zealand Air Force torpedo bomber, while carrying a load of prisoners of war intended for slave labour in German-occupied Norway. In total, 986 people have later been reported killed in the incident; 915 prisoners, in addition to German soldiers and crew members.

== Construction ==
Palatia was built by Schiffswerft H. Koch A.G. in Lübeck in 1928, with yard number 273. Launched on 26 May 1928, and completed in October of the same year, she had a length of 114 metres, beam of 16.4 metres, draught of 6.9 metres and a tonnage of 3,979 tons. She was a single deck, steel-hulled ship with diesel engines, electric lights, wireless radio and a cruiser stern. The 6-cylinder diesel engine produced 3,500 horsepower, and gave Palatia a top speed of 12 knots.

== Hamburg America Line ==
For the first years of her service life, Palatia sailed for the Hamburg America Line. She sailed between Hamburg and the Caribbean until the outbreak of the Second World War.

== Second World War ==
In 1940, during a period of improved relations between Nazi Germany and the Soviet Union, Palatia was sold to the Soviet Union and renamed Khasan. After the German invasion of Russia, she was confiscated by the Kriegsmarine on 22 June 1941 while in the German port city of Stettin. She had her original name Palatia restored.

On her last mission she was used as a prisoner of war transport from Stettin to Ålesund, via Kristiansand, in order to bring slave labourers to work for the Nazi occupants. She carried 999 prisoners and a crew of 34, as well as a Norwegian pilot.

=== Sinking ===
On 21 October 1942 Palatia was sailing off Lindesnes, Norway, escorted by the submarine chaser UJ 1704 and a Junkers Ju 88. She had originally been part of a convoy of three vessels with three submarine chaser escorts from the port of Kristiansand, but the tanker Ostermoor had suffered engine failure and the fellow prisoner ship Ostland (with 1,000 prisoners on board) had run aground. One of the escorts had also suffered engine failure. Palatia's renewed departure from Kristiansand only occurred at 09:00. This left her in an exposed position in poor weather when, at 15:05, she was discovered by one of four Handley Page Hampden torpedo bombers from No. 489 Squadron RNZAF of the RAF Coastal Command that were patrolling the Norwegian coastline that day. At the time the weather was rainy, with winds from strong breeze to near gale and 5 metres (16 ft) waves.

Hampden XA-B, piloted by Flying Officer J.J. Richardson, attacked at an altitude of 60 feet (18 m), launching a torpedo at a range of 550 metres (1,800 ft). The torpedo bomber escaped unscathed in cloud cover, despite heavy anti-aircraft fire and an attempted intercept by the escorting Ju 88. The torpedo hit Palatia in the starboard side, near her engine room. Palatia sank within half an hour of the torpedo attack, at 57°58.1′N 07°14′E. (Note: Flying Officer J.J. Richardson and his crew claimed one shared ship sinking in 1942, in addition to Palatia, of a total claim for 489 Squadron of eight ships sunk in 1942. On 18 January 1943 the aircraft piloted by J.J. Richardson was shot down over the sea during a convoy attack off Lindesnes, and the crew were all taken prisoner.)

Following the torpedo hit panic broke loose on board Palatia, with prisoners attempting to break out of the cargo holds. During the rescue work the crew of UJ 1704 prioritized saving Germans, to the extent that small arms were used against prisoners if they proved to be a hindrance for the rescue of Germans. Only prisoners on rafts or floating debris in the company of German survivors were retrieved. The rescue work was concluded at 18:45. In all only 78 prisoners and 108 Germans survived the sinking. After the incident the crew of Palatia was criticized in German reports for not having conducted the evacuation of the ship in an orderly manner, the sinking thus costing more German lives than might have been the case had the crew acted according to regulations.

The number of perished has been listed as 986 people, including 915 prisoners from the Soviet Union or Eastern Europe. The incident was not reported in the censored press at the time.

For weeks after the sinking of Palatia large numbers of corpses floated ashore on the beaches of the Lista area. The bodies were collected and removed by the Germans. The sinking of Palatia is the second greatest ship disaster in Norwegian history. (Note: The sinking of the German prisoner ship Rigel off Helgeland by Allied aircraft in November 1944 with the loss of more than 2,500 lives is the greatest ship disaster in Norwegian history.)

== Post-war wreck discovery and memorial ==
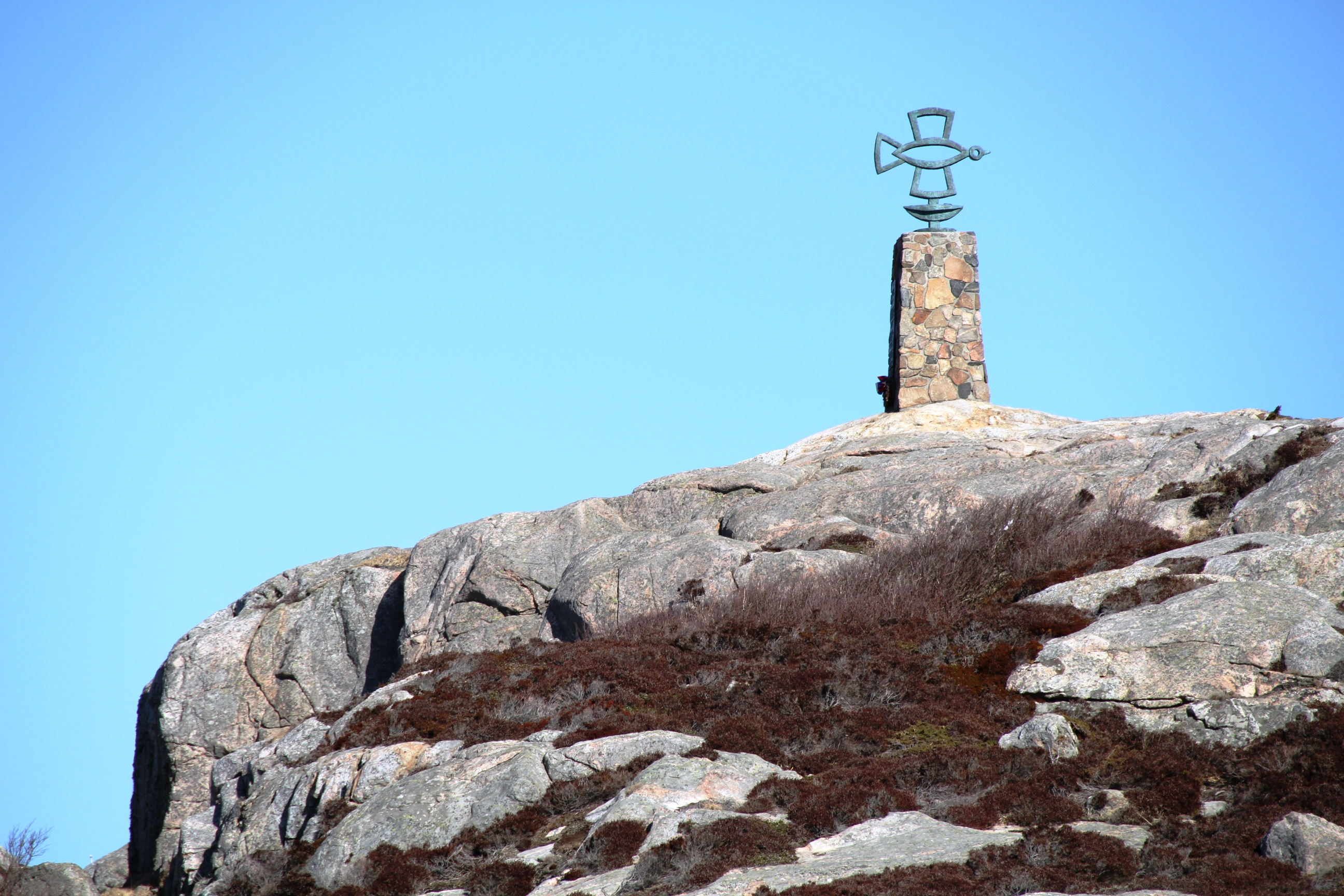
The memorial monument of MS Palatia, Pax by the Lindesnes Lighthouse, created by sculptor Arne Vinje Gunnerud

During the commemoration of the 50th anniversary of the end of the Second World War in Europe, the municipality of Lindesnes held a memorial service on 6 May 1995 in remembrance of the Palatia disaster. An exhibition with art and items relating to Palatia was also displayed.

The wreck was located in 1997, by the Royal Norwegian Navy underwater search and recovery vessel Tyr. A memorial was raised at Lindesnes and unveiled by King Harald V of Norway on 21 September 1997. The memorial monument, titled Pax, was designed by sculptor Arne Vinje Gunnerud. Pax consists of a Common Buzzard in bronze with unfolded wings, on a platform of natural rock. The monument was built on the initiative of Sørlandet krigsminneforening (English: Southern Norway war memorial society) and Lindesnes Municipality. A 986-strong choir, one singer for every life lost on the ship, sang at the unveiling of the monument.
