= Arctowskifjellet =

Mountain in Spitsbergen, Norway

Coordinates: 78.227°N 16.538°E

Arctowskifjellet is a mountain in Nordenskiöld Land at Spitsbergen, Svalbard. It has a height of 958 m.a.s.l. The mountain is named after Polish geophysicist and Arctic explorer Henryk Arctowski. It is located south of Sassenfjorden, and borders to the valley of Adventdalen.
