= Evensen Nunatak =

Nunatak in Graham Land, Antarctica

Evensen Nunatak (64°59′S 60°22′W) is a nunatak 1.5 nautical miles (3 km) northwest of Dallmann Nunatak in the Seal Nunataks group, off the east coast of the Antarctic Peninsula. It was first charted by the Falkland Islands Dependencies Survey in August 1947, and named by them for Captain Carl Julius Evensen of the Hertha, who explored along the west coast of the Antarctic Peninsula in 1893.
