= Niels Carlsen =

Norwegian timber merchant, landowner, shipowner and banker

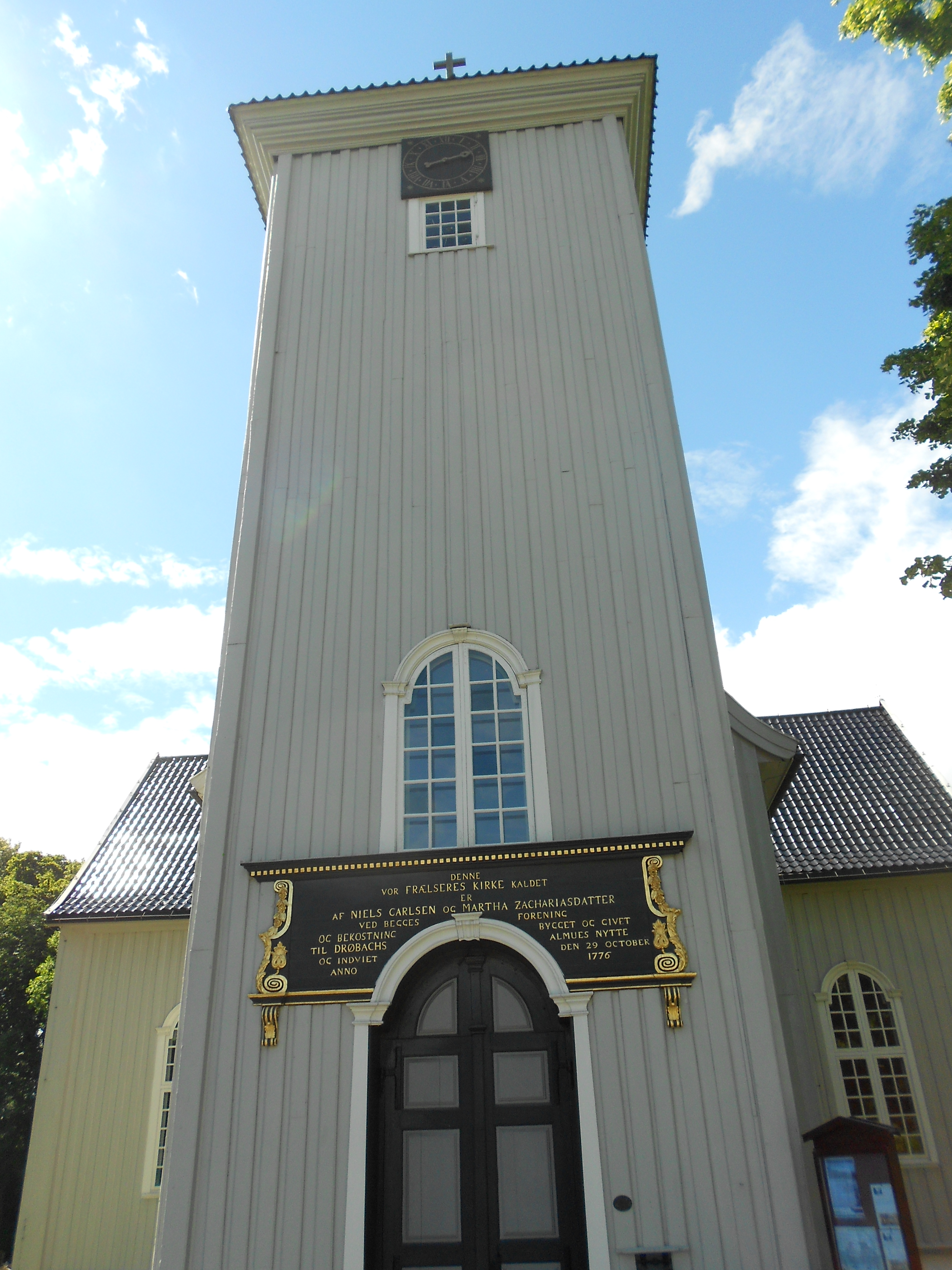
Drøbak Church built in 1776

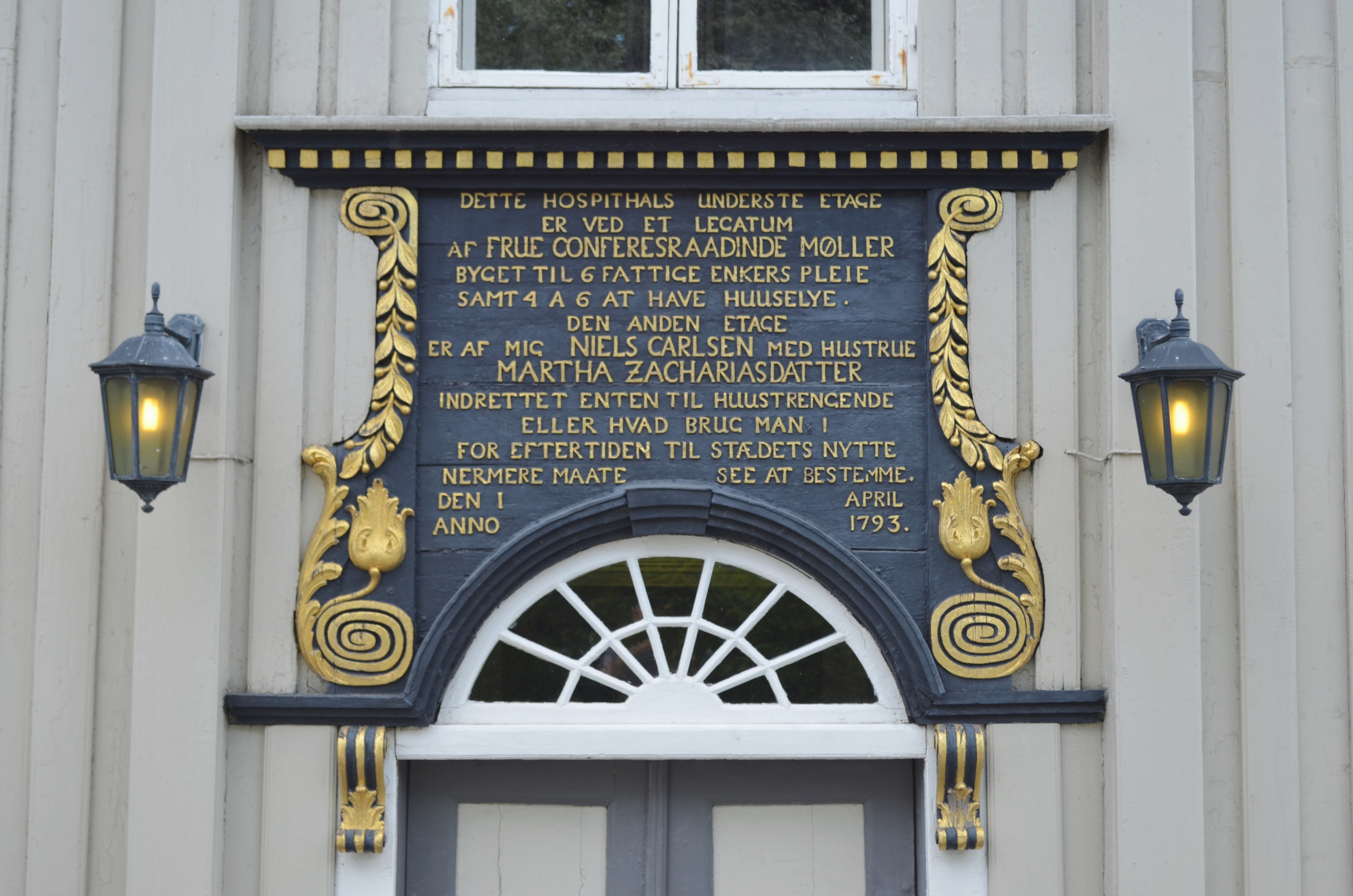
Drøbak Hospital built in 1793

Niels Carlsen (8 January 1734 – 3 May 1809) was a Norwegian timber merchant, landowner, shipowner and banker. Carlsen was one of the biggest ship owners in Norway of his time.

== Career ==
Carlsen was born in Drøbak in Akershus, Norway. He was the son of Jacob Carlsen (ca. 1685-1749) and Maria Jørgensdatter Frost. His father had married the widow of his employer and took over the trading business. Drøbak had a favorable location situated on east side of Drøbak Sound, at the narrowest part of the Oslo Fjord. It was near the capital, had good anchoring and mooring facilities and a protective harbor.

Niels Carlsen and his half brothers Christian went into their father's business and expanded it. The brothers were shipowners, forest owners, traded in both imports and exports and took part in the financing operations that came with the profession. Carlsen bought up forest lands on both sides of the bay, floated the logs into circulation plots which he had acquired along Drøbak Sound, operated a sawmill and built bulwark against the sea to facilitate the loading of ships. He owned a large part of the property along the seafront as well as the small islands where Oscarsborg Fortress is now situated. With these acquisition, he initiated the operation of a ferry landing, plus guest house and coaching inn.

Carlsen married Martha Zachariassen (1743–1821), the daughter of Zacharias Simonsen Wesseltoft (1701-1777), a wealthy merchant and shipowner in Skien. She and her family contributed to the further development of Carlsen's business and to the development of Drøbak. Carlsen and his wife donated funds for a wooden cruciform church, hospital and school. Drøbak Church (Drøbak kirke) was fully furnished and was inaugurated in 1776. Facing the church is the building which was dedicated as a hospital and hostel for poor widows in 1793. A bust of Carlsen, made by Arne Vinje Gunnerud, is located between Drøbak Church and the old Drøbak Hospital.
