= Hertha Nunatak =

Nunatak in Graham Land, Antarctica

- Location within Antarctica

Naming
- Etymology: Carl Julius Evensen's sealing and exploration ship, Hertha

Geography
- Continent: Antarctica
- Area: Graham Land
- Range coordinates: 65°9′S 59°59′W

Climbing
- First ascent: Swedish Antarctic Expedition (1902)

Hertha Nunatak (65°9′S 59°59′W) is a nunatak 1 nautical mile (2 km) northwest of Castor Nunatak in the Seal Nunataks group, off the east coast of the Antarctic Peninsula. It was first seen and mapped as an island in December 1893 by Captain Carl Anton Larsen, who named it after the Hertha, a ship which combined sealing and exploring activities along the west coast of the Antarctic Peninsula under Captain Carl Julius Evensen in 1893–94. It was determined to be a nunatak by the Swedish Antarctic Expedition under Otto Nordenskiöld during a sledge journey in 1902.
