= Christensen Nunatak =

Nunatak in Graham Land, Antarctica

Christensen Nunatak (65°6′S 59°31′W) is a nunatak 1 nautical mile (2 km) north of Robertson Island in the Seal Nunataks group, off the east coast of the Antarctic Peninsula. It was discovered in 1893 by a Norwegian expedition under C.A. Larsen, who named it for Christen Christensen of Sandefjord, Norway, a pioneer of modern Antarctic whaling. It was surveyed in 1902 by the Swedish Antarctic Expedition under Otto Nordenskiöld, and in 1947 and 1953 by the Falkland Islands Dependencies Survey.
