= Carl Julius Evensen =

Norwegian explorer (1851–1937)

Carl Julius Evensen (3 December 1851 – 3 October 1937) was a Norwegian shipmaster and explorer. Cape Evensen on the northwest coast of Antarctica and Evensen Nunatak, off the east coast of the Antarctic Peninsula, were named in his honor.

== Biography ==
He was born at Drøbak in Akershus, Norway. He was a ship captain and resided in between Oslo and Sandefjord. He explored the Antarctic together with Carl Anton Larsen among others, and in 1893 he reached the Antarctic Peninsula on board the barque Hertha.

== Personal life ==
Carl Julius Evensen was married to Severine Marie Jensen in 1879. Carl and Severine had eight children in all, most emigrated to the United States. He died at Brooklyn, New York.

== See also ==
- Cape Evensen
- Hertha Nunatak
