= Jens Carl Peter Brandt =

Norwegian politician (1848–1912)

- Born: 20 June 1848
- Died: 10 August 1912 (aged 64)
- Occupation: politician

Jens Carl Peter Brandt (20 June 1848 – 10 August 1912) was a Norwegian lawyer, property owner and politician with the Conservative Party.

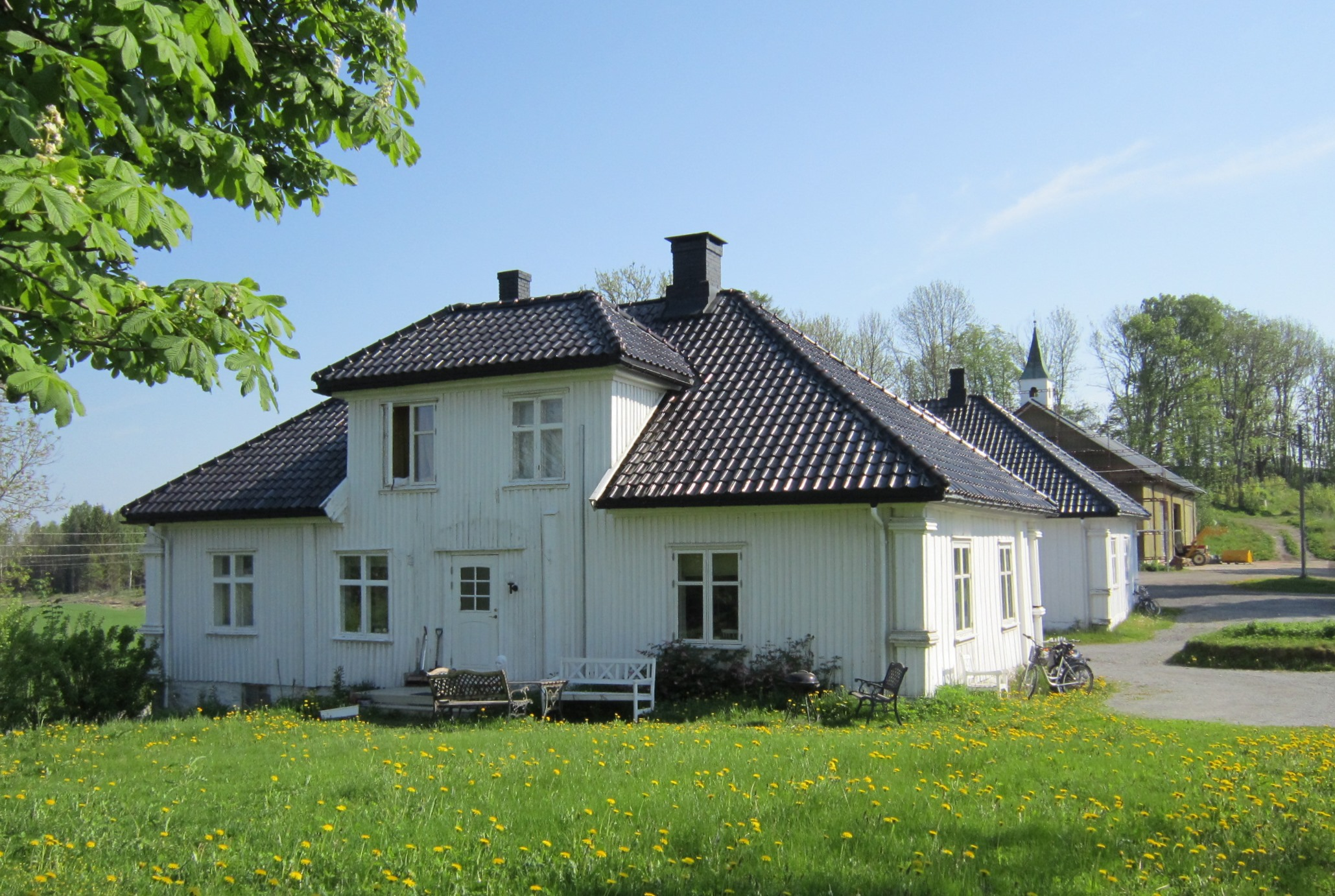
Froen gård in Frogn

He was born on the Froen farm of Frogn parish (Froen gård i Frogn) in Akershus, Norway. He was the son of Captain Ole Peter Brandt (1793–1875) and his second wife Mathilde Kristine Brandt. Members of this family still own this property.

He finished his secondary education in 1865 and graduated with the cand.jur. degree in 1869. He then worked six years as an attorney, before taking over his family manor in 1875. In addition to a farm, the estate had a mill, a sawmill, a planing mill and a brickworks. He was also among the co-founders of the local savings bank, Frogn sparebank, in 1884 and was chairman of the board.

Brandt was a member of Frogn municipal council from 1884 to 1912, serving as mayor from 1884 to 1895. He was elected to the Parliament of Norway in 1900 and 1903, representing the constituency of Akershus Amt. Brandt was also a deputy member of the Norwegian Nobel Committee. He died in August 1912.
