= Murdoch Nunatak =

Nunatak in Graham Land, Antarctica

Murdoch Nunatak (65°1′S 60°2′W) is a nunatak 3 nautical miles (6 km) northeast of Donald Nunatak in the Seal Nunataks group, off the east coast of Antarctic Peninsula. First charted by the Falkland Islands Dependencies Survey (FIDS) in 1947, and named by them for W.G. Burn Murdoch.
