= Arne Vinje Gunnerud =

Norwegian sculptor (1930–2007)

- Born: 11 August 1930; Oslo, Norway
- Died: 25 April 2007 (aged 76); Arendal, Norway
- Occupation: sculptor
- Spouse: Kirsten Birgitte Vinje
- Awards: Order of St. Olav

Arne Vinje Gunnerud (11 August 1930 – 25 April 2007) was a Norwegian sculptor.

== Biography ==
Gunnerud was born in the Vika neighborhood of Oslo and grew up at Drøbak in Akershus. He was the son of Andreas Gunnerud (1879–1951) and Marie Victoria Vinje (1891–1996). He early artistic talent was first discovered by sculptor Sigri Welhaven. He attended the Norwegian National Academy of Craft and Art Industry (Statens håndverks- og kunstindustriskole) from 1947 to 1950. This was followed by attendance at Norwegian National Academy of Fine Arts (Statens kunstakademi) from 1951 to 1954 where he was instructed by Per Palle Storm. He debuted at the Autumn Exhibition (Høstutstillingen) in 1953.

Among his works are the tree sculpture Midgardsormen from 1973, the bronze sculpture Vettløyse from 1978 (located in Oslo), Fenrisulven vil bryte seg løs from 1980 (in Tokyo), Soltreet (suntree) in Stavanger from 1984 and Bacalhaujagt from 1996 (in Lisbon).

He also made the war memorial monument Pax, raised at Lindesnes in 1997 in memory of the sinking of the prison ship Palatia in 1942.
