= German submarine U-735 =

German World War II submarine

History

Nazi Germany
- Name: U-735
- Ordered: 10 April 1941
- Builder: Schichau-Werke, Danzig
- Yard number: 1532
- Laid down: 29 November 1941
- Launched: 10 October 1942
- Commissioned: 28 December 1942
- Fate: Sunk on 28 December 1944

General characteristics
- Class & type: Type VIIC submarine
- Displacement: 769 tonnes (757 long tons) surfaced; 871 t (857 long tons) submerged
- Length: 67.10 m (220 ft 2 in) o/a; 50.50 m (165 ft 8 in) pressure hull
- Beam: 6.20 m (20 ft 4 in) o/a; 4.70 m (15 ft 5 in) pressure hull
- Height: 9.60 m (31 ft 6 in)
- Draught: 4.74 m (15 ft 7 in)
- Installed power: 2,800–3,200 PS (2,100–2,400 kW; 2,800–3,200 bhp) (diesels); 750 PS (550 kW; 740 shp) (electric)
- Propulsion: 2 shafts; 2 × diesel engines; 2 × electric motors
- Speed: 17.7 knots (32.8 km/h; 20.4 mph) surfaced; 7.6 knots (14.1 km/h; 8.7 mph) submerged
- Range: 8,500 nmi (15,700 km; 9,800 mi) at 10 knots (19 km/h; 12 mph) surfaced; 80 nmi (150 km; 92 mi) at 4 knots (7.4 km/h; 4.6 mph) submerged
- Test depth: 230 m (750 ft); Crush depth: 250–295 m (820–968 ft)
- Complement: 4 officers, 40–56 enlisted
- Armament: 5 × 53.3 cm (21 in) torpedo tubes (four bow, one stern); 14 × torpedoes; 1 × 8.8 cm (3.46 in) deck gun (220 rounds); 2 × twin 2 cm (0.79 in) C/30 anti-aircraft guns

Service record
- Part of: 8th U-boat Flotilla; 28 December 1942 – 31 July 1944; 11th U-boat Flotilla; 1 August – 28 December 1944
- Identification codes: M 49 502
- Commanders: Oblt.z.S. Hans-Joachim Börner; 28 December 1942 – 28 December 1944
- Operations: None
- Victories: None

German submarine U-735 was a Type VIIC U-boat built for Nazi Germany's Kriegsmarine for service during World War II.

== Design ==
German Type VIIC submarines were preceded by the shorter Type VIIB submarines. U-735 had a displacement of 769 tonnes (757 long tons) when at the surface and 871 tonnes (857 long tons) while submerged. She had a total length of 67.10 m (220 ft 2 in), a pressure hull length of 50.50 m (165 ft 8 in), a beam of 6.20 m (20 ft 4 in), a height of 9.60 m (31 ft 6 in), and a draught of 4.74 m (15 ft 7 in). The submarine was powered by two Germaniawerft F46 four-stroke, six-cylinder supercharged diesel engines producing a total of 2,800 to 3,200 metric horsepower (2,060 to 2,350 kW; 2,760 to 3,160 shp) for use while surfaced, two AEG GU 460/8–27 double-acting electric motors producing a total of 750 metric horsepower (550 kW; 740 shp) for use while submerged. She had two shafts and two 1.23 m (4 ft) propellers. The boat was capable of operating at depths of up to 230 metres (750 ft).

The submarine had a maximum surface speed of 17.7 knots (32.8 km/h; 20.4 mph) and a maximum submerged speed of 7.6 knots (14.1 km/h; 8.7 mph). When submerged, the boat could operate for 80 nautical miles (150 km; 92 mi) at 4 knots (7.4 km/h; 4.6 mph); when surfaced, she could travel 8,500 nautical miles (15,700 km; 9,800 mi) at 10 knots (19 km/h; 12 mph). U-735 was fitted with five 53.3 cm (21 in) torpedo tubes (four fitted at the bow and one at the stern), fourteen torpedoes, one 8.8 cm (3.46 in) SK C/35 naval gun, 220 rounds, and two twin 2 cm (0.79 in) C/30 anti-aircraft guns. The boat had a complement of between forty-four and sixty.

== Service history ==
U-735 served as a training boat preparing U-boat crews for service in the Atlantic Ocean. Her home base was Horten Naval Base in Norway, from which she operated on short coastal patrols, practicing in fjords and channels for submarine warfare. A Type VIIC U-boat, U-735 was very useful for preparing sailors and officers for service in modern boats, as opposed to the new models usually used in training.

Commissioned at Christmas 1942 in Danzig after an exceptionally long building period, U-735 was given to Oberleutnant zur See Hans-Joachim Börner, who remained in command of the boat right up to her destruction exactly two years later, when he was killed on board his ship. Dispatched to Norway, Börner soon became an expert on the Norwegian seaways, and was able to train a large number of sailors on his practice missions from Horten.

On the 28 December 1944, RAF Bomber Command sought to eradicate the menace of submarines sailing from Norwegian bases, and launched a major raid on Horten with 57 Avo Lancaster bombers. U-735 was anchored in the naval harbour at Horten. When the air raid alarm came at 21.30, U-735 eventually succeeded in leaving the harbour, having had trouble starting her diesels. At 23.30 NE of Horten she caught the full force of a bomb, sinking just outside the harbour, south of Mølen Island, with 26 men killed and ten missing, including her captain. Only one crew member survived, plus ten crew members who were on leave in Horten. She was the only U-boat to be lost in the attack. The wreck was rediscovered in a depth of 190 meters by a Royal Norwegian Navy divers from sub-sea surveillance ship, HNoMS Tyr in 1999. A high-resolution SAS image of the wreck which is in upright position made the cover of Sea Technology Magazine in June 2006, and another SAS image of U-735 is made available by the Norwegian Defence Reseasrch Establishment. Two other ships were also sunk in the air attack: Holmengraa and Nordvard.

== Bibliography ==
- Busch, Rainer; Röll, Hans-Joachim (1999). German U-boat commanders of World War II : a biographical dictionary. Translated by Brooks, Geoffrey. London, Annapolis, Md: Greenhill Books, Naval Institute Press. ISBN 1-55750-186-6.
- Busch, Rainer; Röll, Hans-Joachim (1999). Der U-Boot-Krieg, 1939-1945: Deutsche U-Boot-Verluste von September 1939 bis Mai 1945 [German U-boat losses from September 1939 to May 1945] (in German). Vol. IV. Hamburg, Berlin, Bonn: Mittler. ISBN 3-8132-0514-2.
- Gröner, Eric; Jung, Dieter; Maass, Martin (1991). German Warships 1815-1945: U-boats and Mine Warfare Vessels. Vol. 2. Translated by Thomas, Keith; Magowan, Rachel. London: Conway Maritime Press. ISBN 0-85177-593-4.
- Sharpe, Peter (1998). U-Boat Fact File. Great Britain: Midland Publishing. ISBN 1-85780-072-9.
