= Donald Nunatak =

- Location within Antarctic Peninsula

Highest point
- Coordinates: 65°5′S 60°6′W

Geography
- Location: Seal Nunataks, Graham Land

Donald Nunatak is a nunatak 1.5 nautical miles (3 km) north of Gray Nunatak in the Seal Nunataks group, off the east coast of the Antarctic Peninsula. It was charted in 1902 by the Swedish Antarctic Expedition under Otto Nordenskiöld, and named by him for Dr. C.W. Donald, ship's doctor and naturalist on the Active, one of the vessels of the Dundee Whaling Expedition, 1892–93.
