= Arctowski Cove =

Arctowski Cove (62°9′S 58°29′W) is a small cove at the southeast side of Point Thomas in Admiralty Bay, King George Island, Antarctica. It was named by a Polish Antarctic Expedition (1977–79) after Henryk Arctowski, Polish meteorologist with the Belgian Antarctic Expedition, 1897–99, and in association with the Henryk Arctowski Polish Antarctic Station on Point Thomas.
