= Arctowski Dome =

Arctowski Dome (62°8′S 58°38′W) is an axial, main ice dome of King George Island, between 57°45'W and 58°50'W. Named by the Polish Antarctic Expedition, 1980, after Henryk Arctowski (1871–1958), a Polish meteorologist.
