= Per Deberitz =

Norwegian painter (1880–1945)

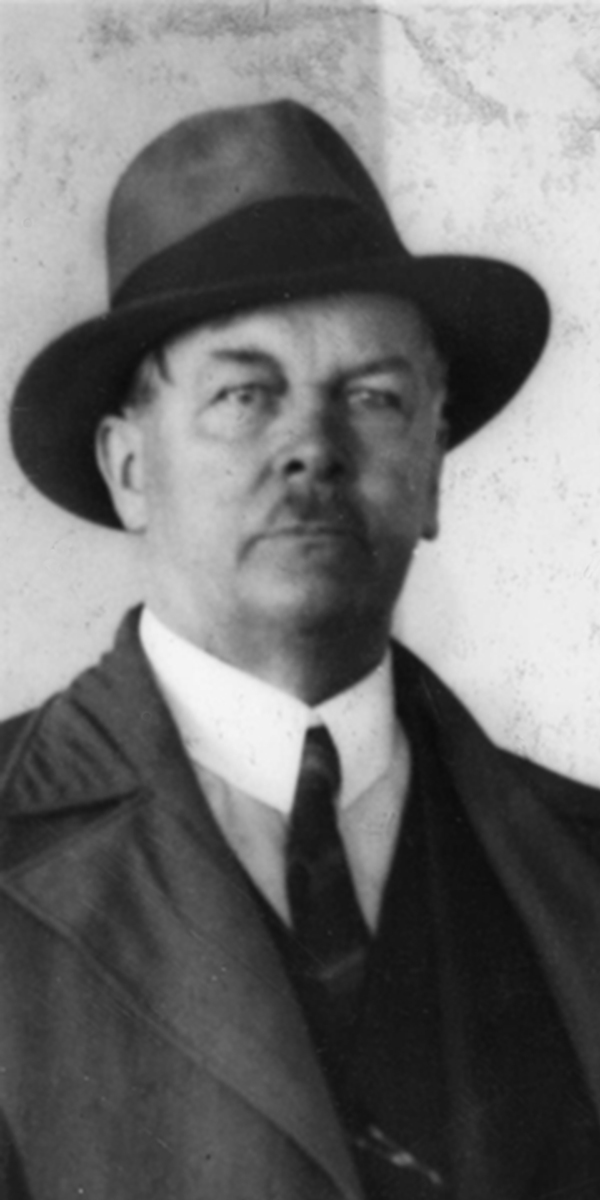
- Deberitz, ca. 1935; Oslo Museum photograph
- Born: Peder Deberitz; 27 March 1880; Oscarsborg at Drøbak (Frogn), Akershus, Norway
- Died: 14 October 1945 (aged 65); Oslo
- Resting place: Borre, Horten
- Education: Kunst- og Håndverksskole, Kristian Zahrtmann's school
- Known for: Painting, drawing
- Notable work: Nakne gutter (1913); Stående kvinneakt (1914); Badende gutter (1914); Sommerlandskap, Skåtøy (1921); Negerpike (1927); Akt (1928); Kvinneakt (1929)
- Movement: Neo-impressionism
- Spouse(s): (1) Valborg Holmsen (2) Selma Harriet Aas

Per Aass Deberitz (also Peder Deberitz, 27 March 1880 – 14 October 1945) was a Norwegian painter. He was regarded as a neo-impressionist and was also a pupil of Henri Matisse during the years of his stay in Paris from 1909 to 1910.

== Early life and education ==
Deberitz was born in Drøbak, Norway, the son of master mason Carl Ludvig Deberitz and Emilie Aass. When he was two years old, Deberitz's family moved to the village of Borre in Horten, Vestfold, where he grew up. The famed painter Edvard Munch, who had rented lodgings with the family during the summers of 1885 and 1886, lent painting materials to the boy and encouraged his artistic efforts.

From 1898 to 1899 Deberitz was a pupil of Oscar Wergeland at the Norwegian National Academy of Craft and Art Industry (Kunst- og Håndverksskole) in Kristiania. In the summers of 1899 and 1900, he also had lessons from the romanticist painter Hans Gude at the latter's “Sølvkronen” villa in Horten. During the winters of 1903–1904 and 1906–1907 he was at Artists Studio School (Kunstnernes Frie Studieskoler) in Copenhagen, often known as “Kristian Zahrtmann's school”, because of the prominence of that teacher.In 1909-10 he lived in Paris as a student of Henri Matisse.

In 1904 he married Valborg Holmsen, daughter of landowner Aslak Holmsen. After the dissolution of that marriage, in 1909 he remarried Selma Harriet Aas (born 14 November 1876), daughter of brewery owner Poul Lauritz Aass and Christine Sophie Landmark.

== Career ==
In a period from 1906 to 1945, he placed three works with the National Art Exhibition (Høstutstillingen). Deberitz broke through at the 1914 Jubilee Exhibition at Frogner with, among others, his work Badende gutter (Bathing Boys, 1914). Here he exhibited together with leading artists of the time, including Henrik Sørensen, Axel Revold, Per Krohg and Jean Heiberg.

His works include significant landscapes and are situated in a French modernist, neo-impressionist tradition. He was a member of Bildende Kunstneres Styre, today known as Norske Billedkunstnere (“Norway’s visual artists”) from 1916 to 1925, and also served on the advisory board and procurement committee for Norway's National Gallery. His works have been exhibited in individual and collective exhibitions in Sweden, Denmark, Germany, Finland, Austria, the USA and Belgium, as well as at larger art societies in Norway. During his lifetime, however, he mounted only two solo exhibitions, at Gallery Gauguin in Oslo (1929) and in Kunstnerforbundet (1931).

Deberitz died in Oslo. Some of his works are today in Norway's National Museum of Art, Architecture and Design as well as in the museums in Stavanger, Lillehammer, Drammen, Bergen, Finland's Ateneum (Helsinki) and Sweden's Moderna Museet (Stockholm). He received the Order of the Polar Star in 1923.
