= Rotary Norden =

Nordic lifestyle magazine

- Categories: Lifestyle magazine; Membership magazine
- Frequency: Eight times per year
- Founded: 1936; 89 years ago
- Language: Danish; Finnish; Norwegian; Swedish
- Website: Rotary Norden

Rotary Norden is an official publication of the Rotary International. The magazine has existed since 1936 and has been a certified publication of the organization since 1981. It has four language editions, Swedish, Danish, Norwegian, and Finnish and has been distributed to the Rotarians in five countries: Sweden, Denmark, Norway, Finland and Iceland. In the latter the Danish edition is distributed.

== History and profile ==
Rotary Norden was established in 1936 and became an official publication of the Rotary International in 1981. It is part of the Rotary World Magazine Press. The magazine is published in four languages: Swedish, Danish, Norwegian, and Finnish. It has been distributed eight times per year to the Rotarians in Sweden, Denmark, Norway, Finland and Iceland. In each country the magazine has a separate editorial office.

Each language edition has a different editor. However, it was previously edited by a sole editor from one of the countries. Jens Otto Kjæ Hansen served as the editor of the Danish edition of the magazine. As of September 2022 Rotary Norden is the second largest among the 30 Rotary magazines in terms of its circulation.
