= Reidar Finsrud =

Norwegian artist (born 1946)

Reidar Finsrud (born 5 March 1946 in Drøbak) is a Norwegian artist. He was educated at the Norwegian National Academy of Craft and Art Industry majoring in graphical arts. His 1970 thesis project "Venezia" received the honor "commended to the King" (laudabilis cum litteris commendatitiis), this was only the third time in the history of the school a student received this highest honor. In 1975 he opened "Gallery Finsrud", the largest privately owned art gallery in Eastern Norway. The same year he also opened "Finsrud's drawing and painting school".

== Artist and inventor ==
Finsrud works with various techniques and formats: painting, drawing, graphics and sculpture. His work emphasizes technical invention and industrial design. His invention "Perpetuum mobile" received a lot of media attention, which was finished in 1996. He has developed his own direct casting technique which he has used for most of his sculptures. He has also constructed his own printing press, which he uses for making graphic printmaking documentary about Finsrud has also been made: Det umuliges kunst (The Art of the Impossible), which was shown on NRK and some international TV-stations. The documentary describes Finsrud's artistic works, especially focusing on his Invention Perpetuum mobile. It was directed by Øyvind Asbjørnsen.
