= Einar Sandberg =

Norwegian footballer (1905-1987)

Personal information
- Date of birth: 3 November 1905
- Date of death: 5 July 1987 (aged 81)

International career
Years	Team	Apps	(Gls)
1926	Norway	1	(0)

Einar Sandberg (3 November 1905 – 5 July 1987) was a Norwegian footballer. He played in one match for the Norway national football team in 1926.
