= Henryk Arctowski =

Polish scientist and explorer

Henryk Bronisław Arctowski
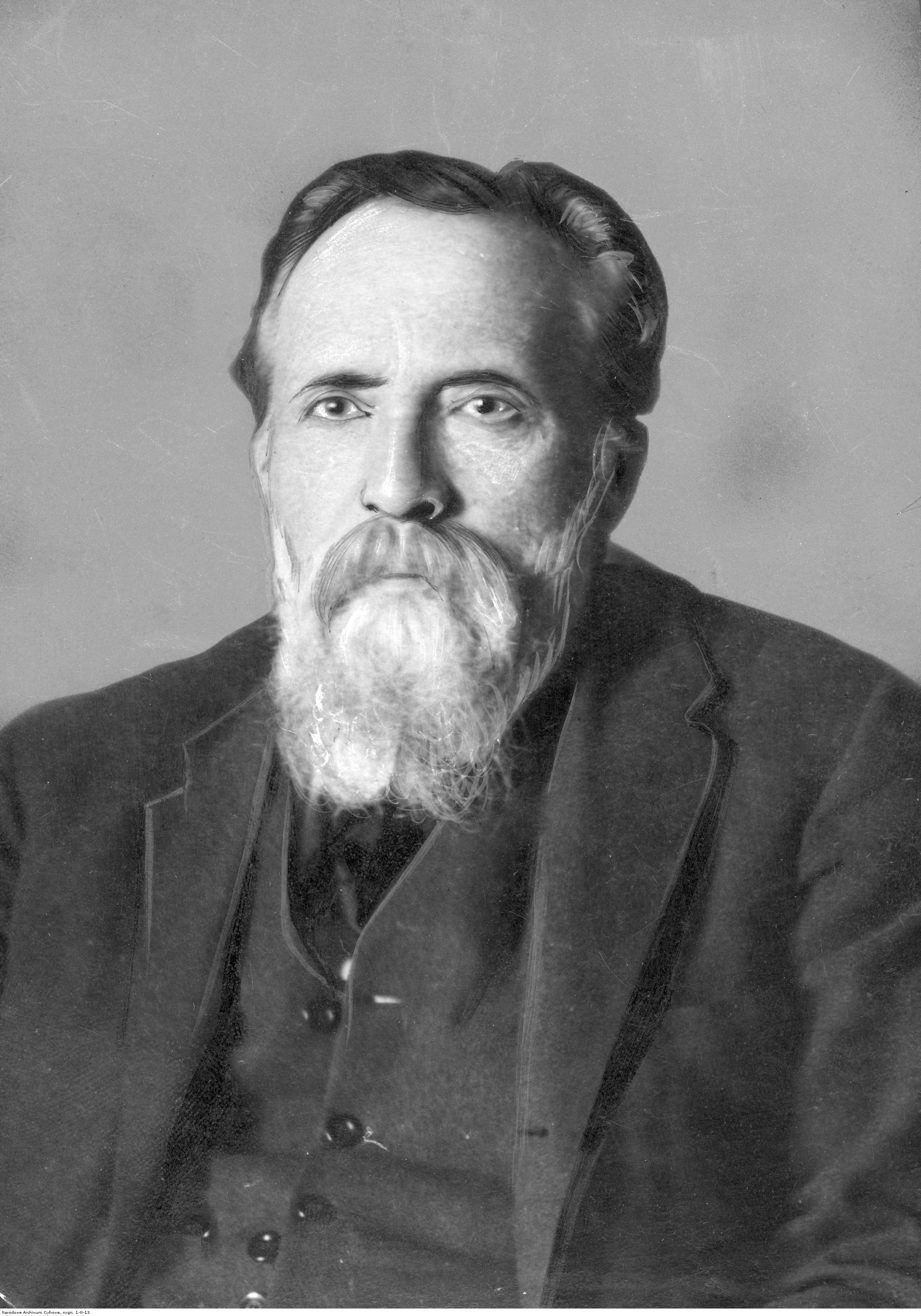
- Born: July 15, 1871; Warsaw, Congress Poland, Russian Empire
- Died: February 21, 1958 (aged 86); Bethesda, Maryland, United States
- Resting place: Powązki Military Cemetery, Warsaw; 52.2613884°N 20.9543115°E
- Education: University of Liège; Sorbonne University
- Known for: in charge of scientific observations on the Belgian Antarctic Expedition
- Spouse: Arian Jane Addy
- Scientific career
- Fields: oceanography, geology, geophysics
- Workplaces: University of Liège; New York Public Library; Jan Kazimierz University; Smithsonian Institution

Henryk Bronisław Arctowski (15 July 1871 – 21 February 1958; Polish pronunciation: [ˈxɛnrɨk art͡sˈtɔfskʲi]), born Henryk Artzt, was a Polish scientist and explorer.

Living in exile for a large part of his life, Arctowski was educated in Belgium and France. He was one of the first humans to winter in Antarctica, as part of the Belgian Antarctic Expedition, and became an internationally renowned meteorologist, also working for over 10 years in the United States. Arctowski was instrumental in restoring Polish independence after the First World War, after which he returned to Poland, where he continued a prolific academic career, having even declined an offer to become Minister of Education. At the time World War II broke out, Arctowski and his wife were in America, and they were unable to return; he spent the final part of his career working as a researcher at the Smithsonian until his retirement, and died in 1958 in Bethesda, Maryland.

Several geographical features, the Henryk Arctowski Polish Antarctic Station and a medal of the National Academy of Sciences are named in his honor. The ashes of Arctowski and his wife were later brought to Poland, as he had asked in his will.

== Early life ==
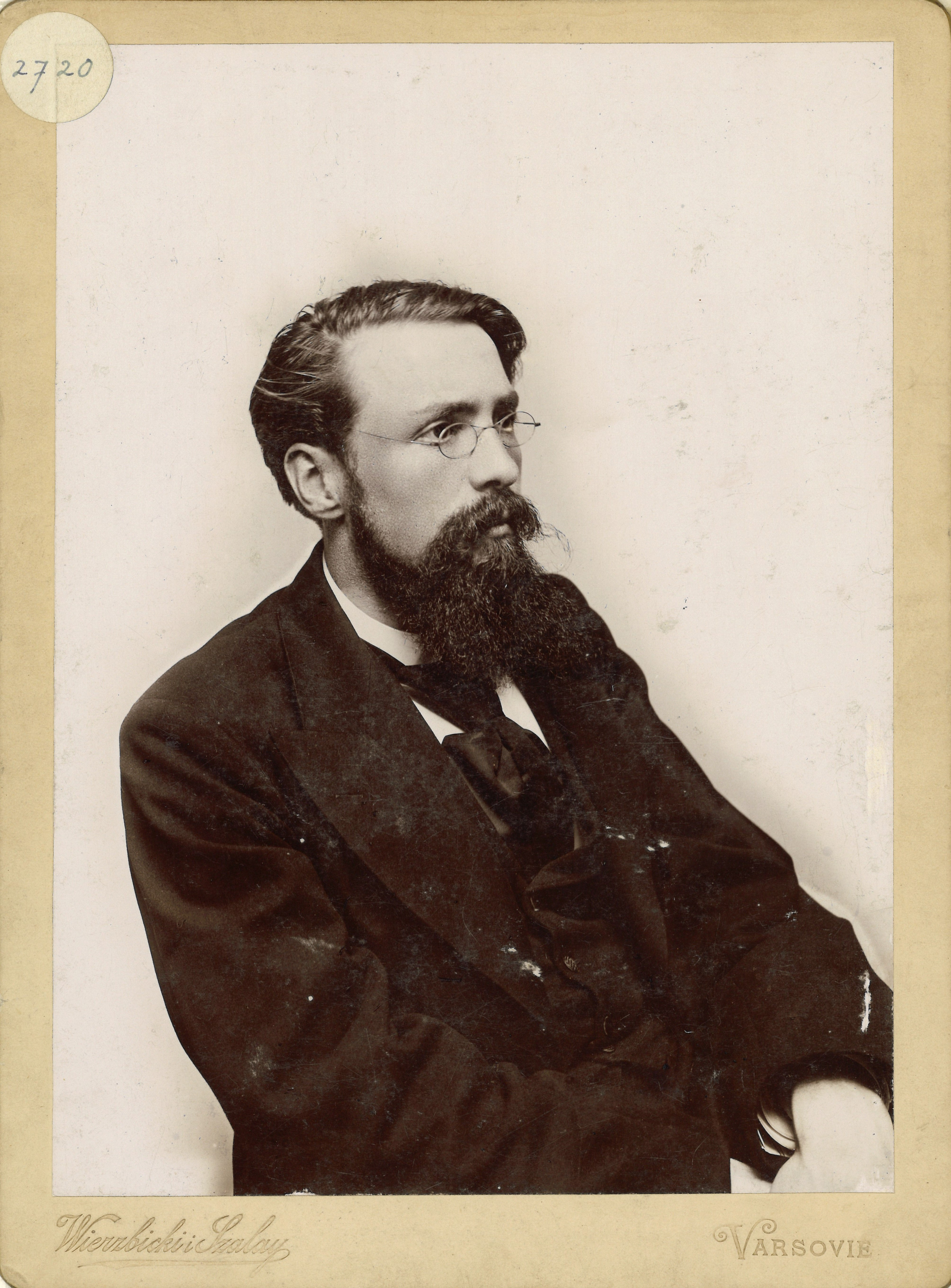
Arctowski in 1889

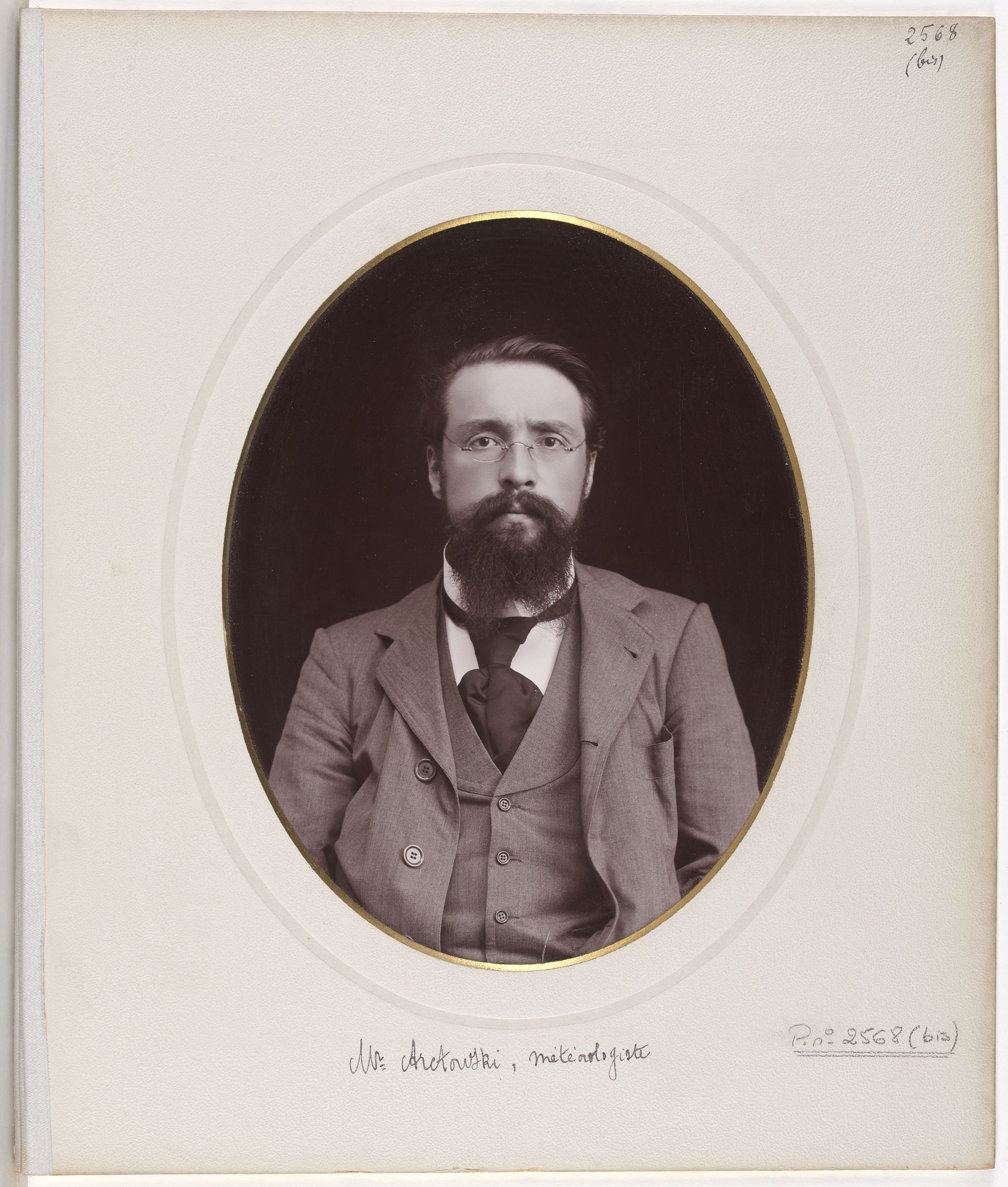
Arctowski in 1899

Henryk Arctowski was born in Warsaw on 15 July 1871 to the Artzt family, whose ancestors came to Poland in the 17th century from Württemberg, Germany. As a pupil in the German-occupied part of Poland, he was prosecuted for speaking Polish in school, so his parents sent him to Liège. In 1888 he started studying mathematics, physics and astronomy at the University of Liège, and chemistry and geology at the Sorbonne. Upon completion in 1893, he returned to Liège where he worked in the laboratory of Walthère Spring in the chemistry department until 1899. In 1893, to emphasize his Polishness, Artzt asked the Belgian government for permission to change his name to Arctowski.

== Belgian Antarctic Expedition ==
In 1895 he applied to participate in the Belgian Antarctic Expedition, the first expedition to spend the winter in the Antarctic. Shipmates included Roald Amundsen and Frederick A. Cook. He coordinated the scientific work and performed physical observations himself, assisted by Antoni Bolesław Dobrowolski.

== Brussels and New York ==
After his return from the Antarctic he lived in Brussels, analyzing the results of the expedition at the Royal Observatory of Belgium, at that time headed by Lecointe, the second-in-command of the expedition. Besides publishing, he presented lectures on the expedition, both in Belgium and abroad. On a lecture tour in London he met the American actress and opera singer Arian Jane Addy, whom he married in March 1909. During this period he obtained the Belgian nationality. Around that time it was mentioned (including in letters by Ernest Shackleton) that he was considering another Antarctic expedition, but this did not take place.

In 1909 he moved with his wife to New York, where he headed the science division of the New York Public Library from 1911 to 1919. In 1915 he became an American citizen.

Arctowski joined The Explorers Club in New York in 1920.

== Return to Poland ==
In 1920 he returned to newly independent Poland. Prime minister Paderewski had offered him the position of minister of education, but he refused and became professor of geophysics and meteorology at Jan Kazimierz University. He was very active in research (144 papers were published by him and his assistants) and involved in the International Union of Geodesy and Geophysics. In 1939 he traveled with his wife to the United States to attend a conference of the International Union of Geodesy and Geophysics, when the Soviet Union and Nazi Germany invaded Poland. They never managed to return to Poland and lost all their possessions.

== Exile in the United States ==
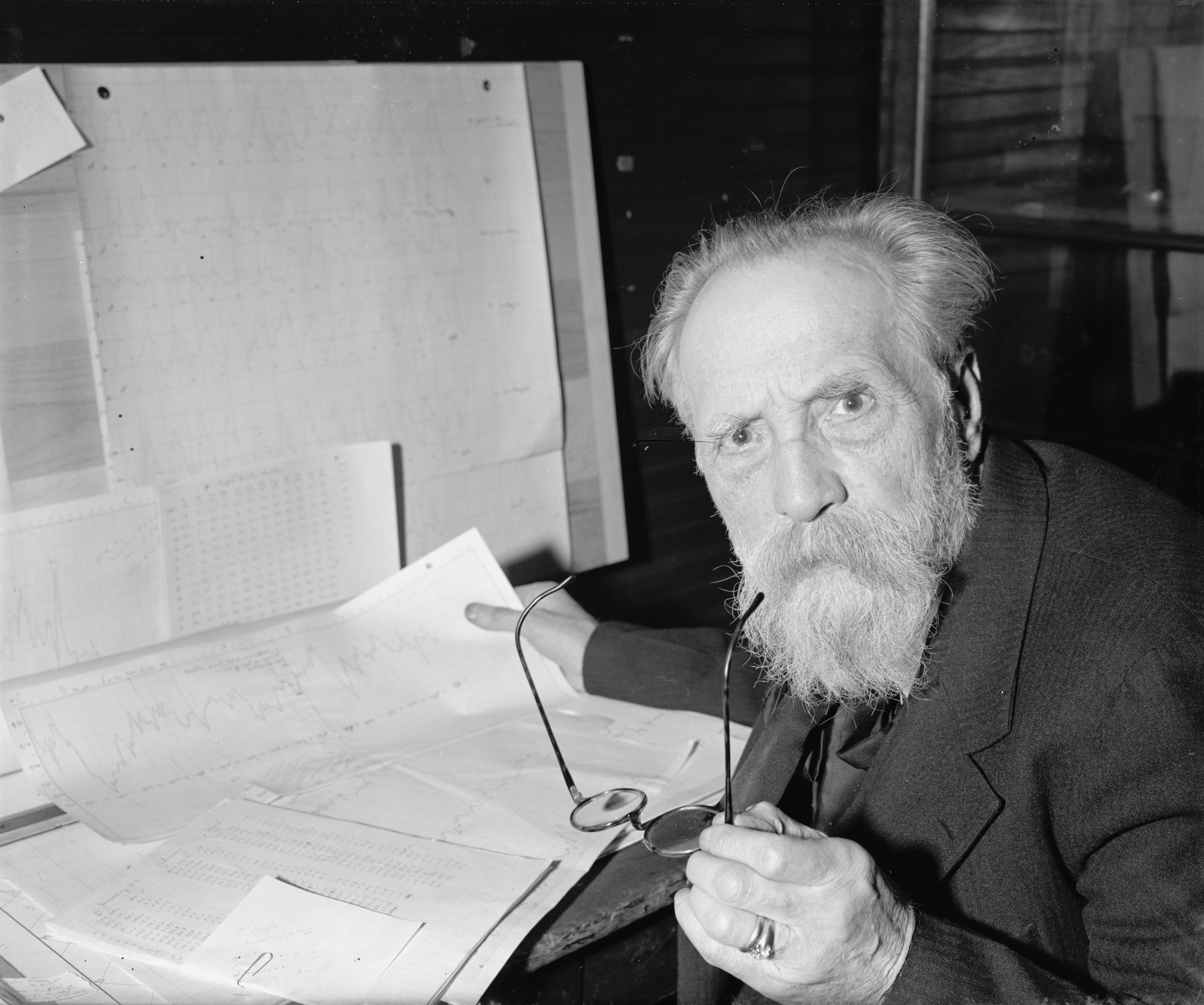
Arctowski in Washington, March, 1940

He accepted a position as a research associate at the Smithsonian and continued doing research until his death, even when he was obliged to resign in 1950 due to an illness. He died in Bethesda, Maryland.

== Tributes ==
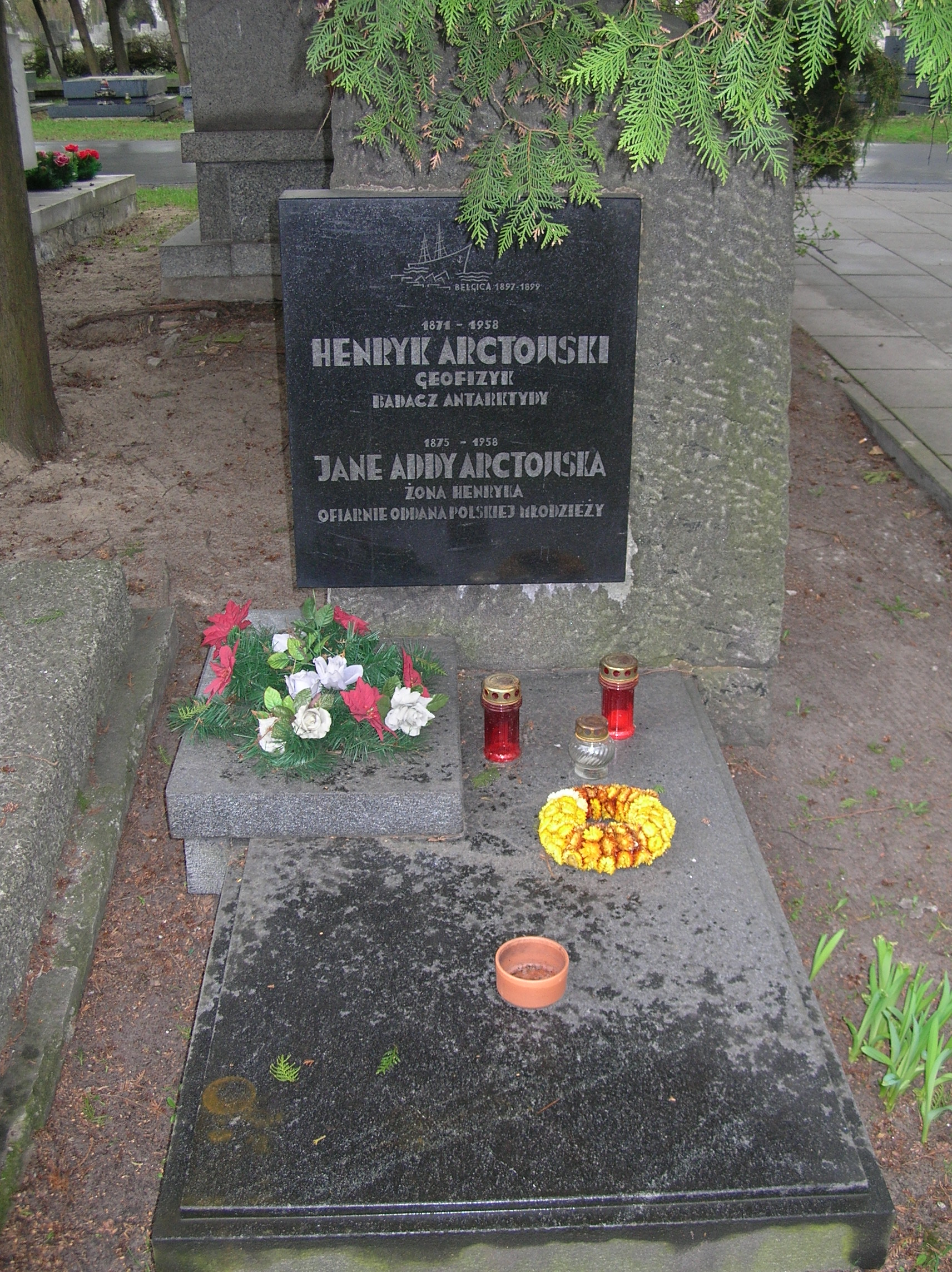
Grave of Arctowski and his wife in Warsaw, Poland

His name has been given to a phenomenon in which a halo resembling a rainbow, with two other partial arcs symmetrical to the main one, forms around the sun as light is refracted through ice crystals in the atmosphere.

In recognition of his work and his contribution to science, his name has been given to a number of geographical features:

In Antarctica:

- Arctowski Dome
- Arctowski Cove
- Arctowski Peninsula
- Arctowski Nunatak
- Arctowski Peak

In Spitsbergen:

- Arctowskifjellet (Mt. Arctowski)
- Arctowskibreen (Arctowski glacier)

The Polish research station on King George Island, Henryk Arctowski Polish Antarctic Station, is also named after him.

His widow established the Arctowski Medal through the Henryk Arctowski Fund, awarded every two years by the National Academy of Sciences for "studies in solar physics and solar-terrestrial relationships."

The Polish Navy named its survey ship ORP Arctowski after him.

In 2024, the first biography of the scientist “Henryk Arctowski. In a World of Thoughts” written by Dagmara Bożek and Katarzyna Dąbkowska was published.

== See also ==
- Henryk Arctowski Polish Antarctic Station
- List of Poles
