= Sentrum (Fredrikstad) =

Region of Fredrikstad, Norway

Coordinates: 59°13′30″N 10°55′29″E

Sentrum is an administrative region in the city of Fredrikstad, Norway. The name "Sentrum" means central, but the region itself includes several areas far away from the city centre itself. Neighbourhoods in Sentrum are: The city centre, Trosvik, Trara, Cicignon, Lisleby, Holmen and Ambjørnrød.
