= Bruce Nunatak =

Nunatak in Graham Land, Antarctica

Bruce Nunatak (65°5′S 60°15′W) is a nunatak which lies 2 nautical miles (4 km) west of Donald Nunatak in the Seal Nunataks group, off the east coast of the Antarctic Peninsula. It was first charted in 1902 by the Swedish Antarctic Expedition under Otto Nordenskiöld, who named it for Dr. William S. Bruce, the leader of the Scottish National Antarctic Expedition, 1902–04.
