= Drøbak =

- Unincorporated city Former municipality
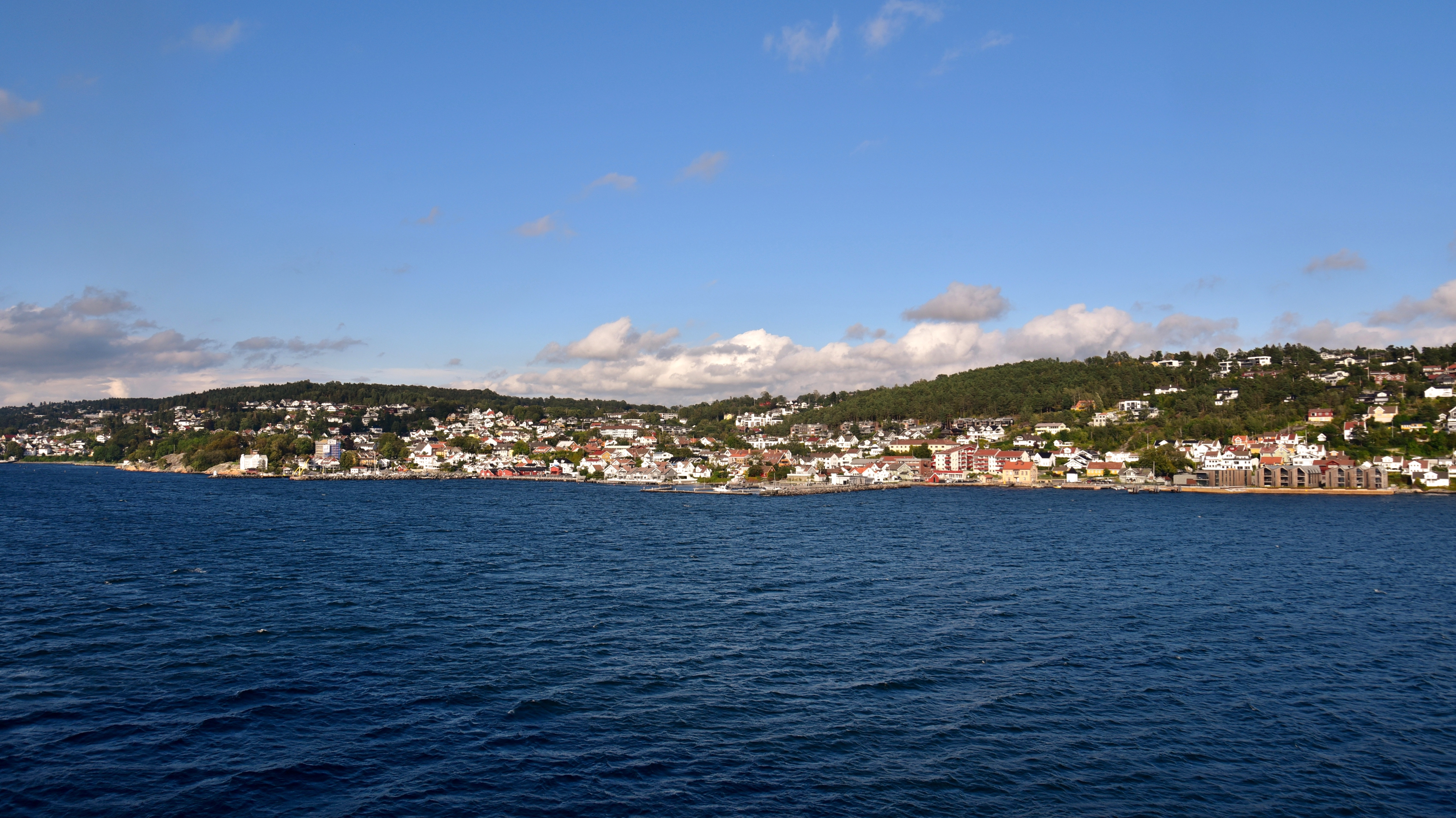
- Drøbak seen from the Oslofjord

- Location within Akershus Drøbak (Norway)
- Coordinates: 59°40′N 10°38′E
- Country: Norway
- County: Akershus
- District: Follo
- Municipality: Frogn
- City status (regained): 13 February 2006

Population (2017)
  - Total: 13,409
  - Density: 2,429/km^{2} (6,290/sq mi)
- Time zone: UTC+1 (CET)
  - Summer (DST): UTC+2 (CEST)

Drøbak is a town and the centre of the municipality of Frogn, in Akershus county, Norway. It is located along the Oslofjord and had 13,409 inhabitants as of 2017.

== History ==
Drøbak and Frogn were established as a separate parish by royal decree on 8 September 1823. It had been a part of Ås parish.

Drøbak was established as a municipality on 1 January 1838 (see formannskapsdistrikt). It was merged with Frogn on 1 January 1962.

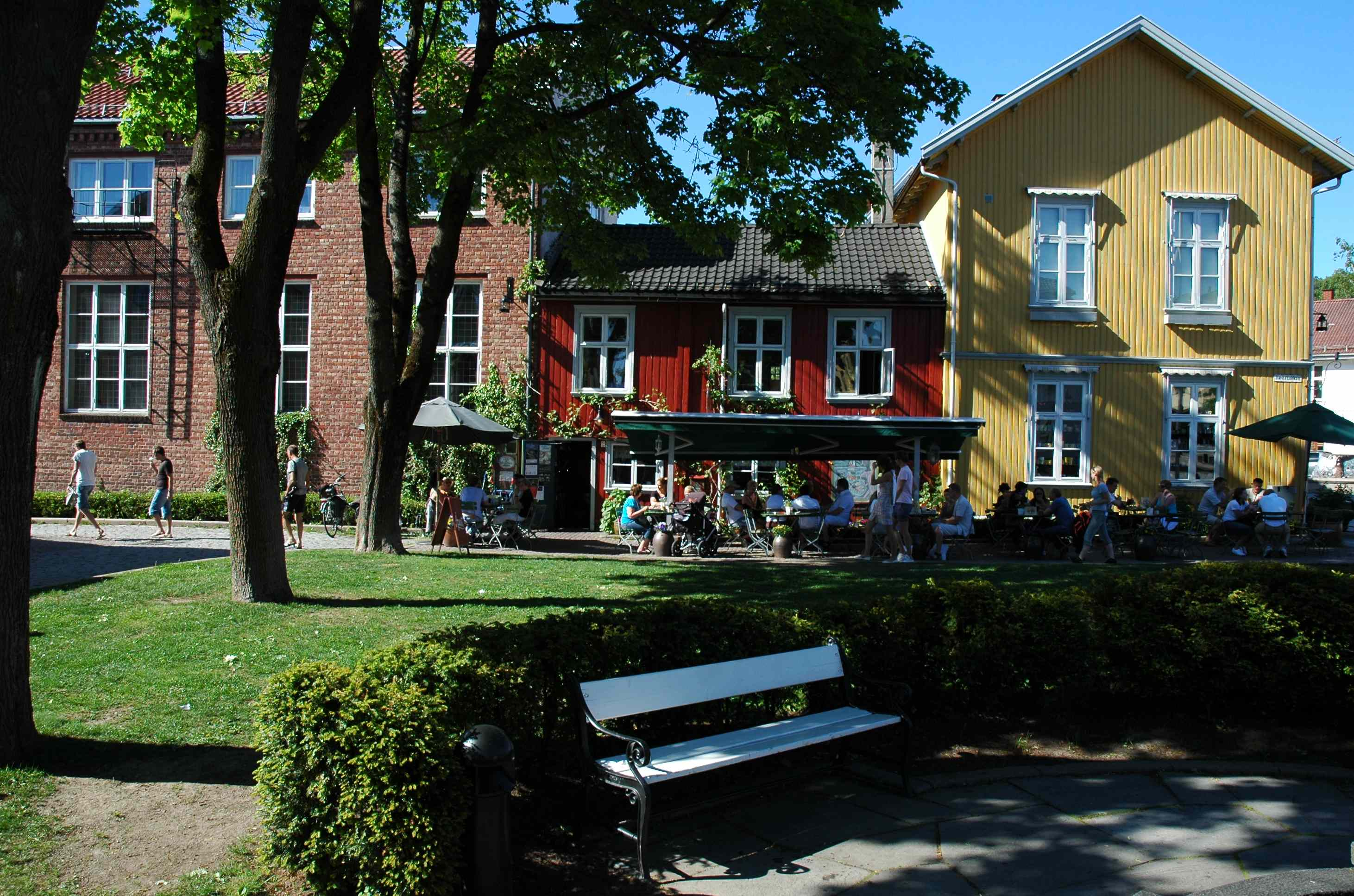
The old bakery in Drøbak

Traditionally, Drøbak was the winter harbour of Norway's capital, Oslo, since in severe winters the fjord would freeze from outside Drøbak all the way up to Oslo. It had city status between 1842 and 1962, at which point the municipality was merged into the rural municipality Frogn and lost its city status. The city status was regained by the municipality council on 13 February 2006. It was also decided that adjacent villages such as Heer would be included within the city.

A notable event in Drøbak's history is the World War II sinking of the German cruiser Blücher in the Drøbak narrows (only 1 mile (1.5 km) wide), on the early morning of 9 April 1940. The cruiser was transporting German soldiers and bureaucrats for the planned swift occupation of Oslo, but the Battle of Drøbak Sound, resulting in the sinking by the Oscarsborg fortress, delayed this and thus allowed for the evacuation of the Norwegian royal family, parliament, and cabinet, and for the nation's gold reserves to be denied the occupiers.

From early on Drøbak had ferries that crossed the fjord; in modern times, they have largely been replaced by the Oslofjordtunnel. However, some of the old ferries are still used as "floating restaurants" during the summer.

== Tourism ==
In summertime, cruise ships visit Oslo almost every day. Often, as many as four or five cruise ships visit each day. In addition to all the regular traffic, this has made Drøbak a popular sea-side tourist spot. However, the numerous restaurants, art galleries and mild summers are probably more important factors attracting tourists.

Drøbak is also known for its many art galleries. The town has a Christmas shop called Julehuset (the Christmas house), and letters often end up in Drøbak from Europe similarly to how they end up in Santa Claus, Indiana in the United States.

During the summer months, there are tourist buses going from Oslo to Drøbak on day trips. Visitors can experience a traditional Norwegian fjord town. It is also a popular Oslo suburb, as public transportation is well connected between Drøbak and Oslo, both by bus and boat.

In the marina at the approach to Drøbak is a sculpture, made by Reidar Finsrud, cast in bronze, depicting three mermaids sitting on a rock. The sculpture was unveiled in 1999.

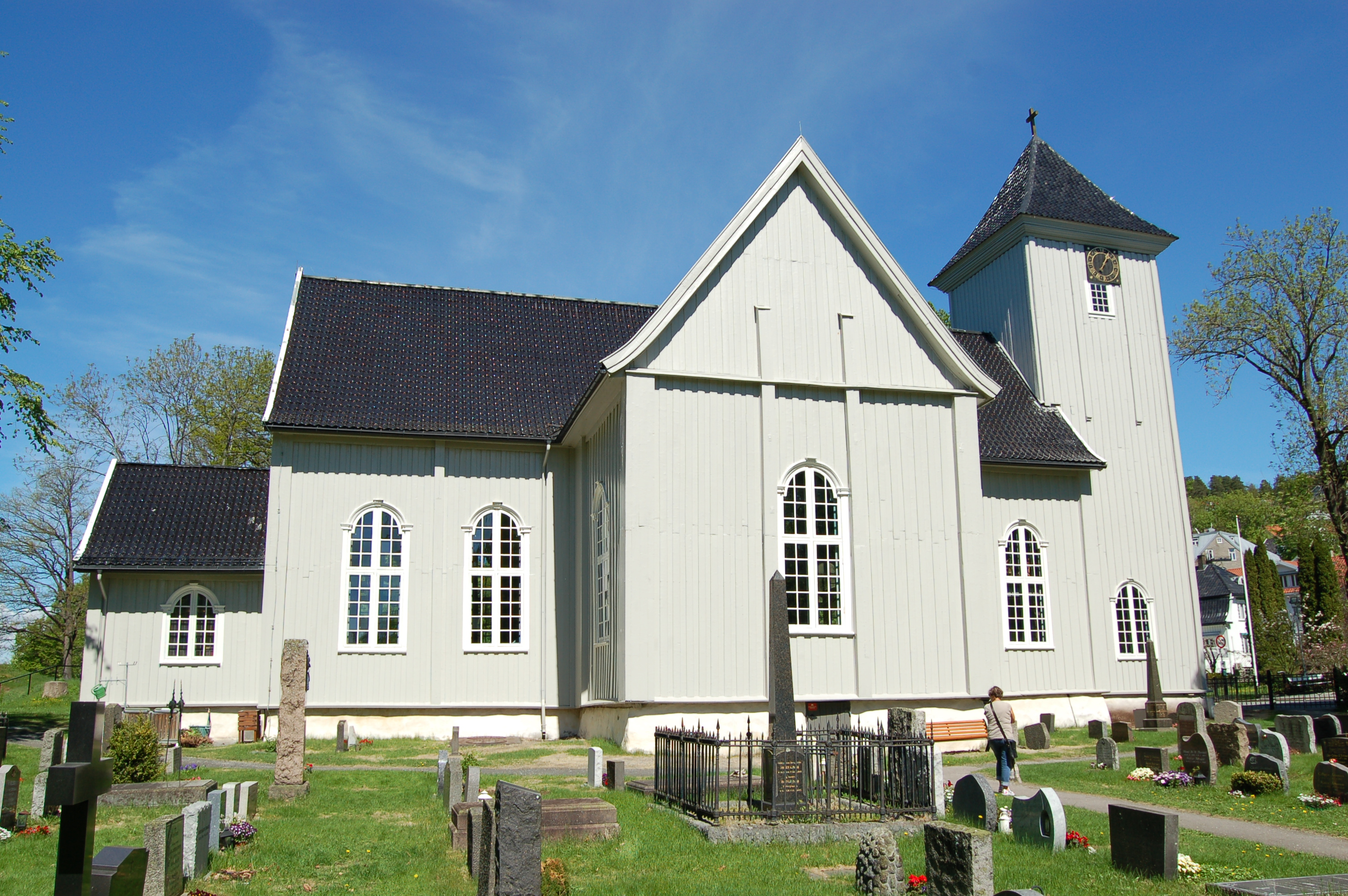
Drøbak Church

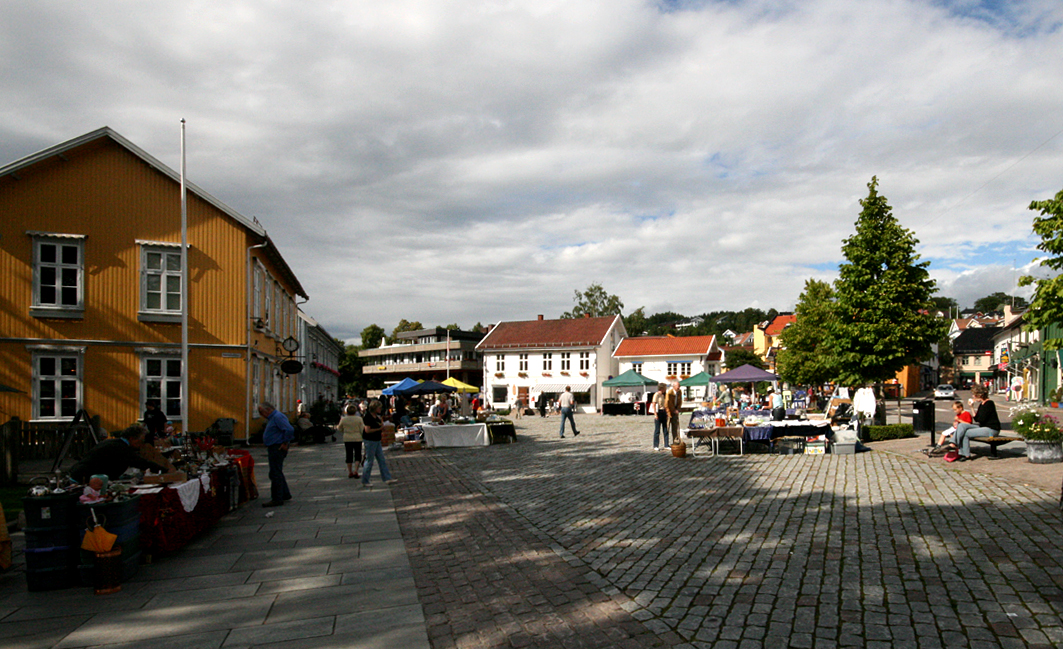
Square in Drøbak

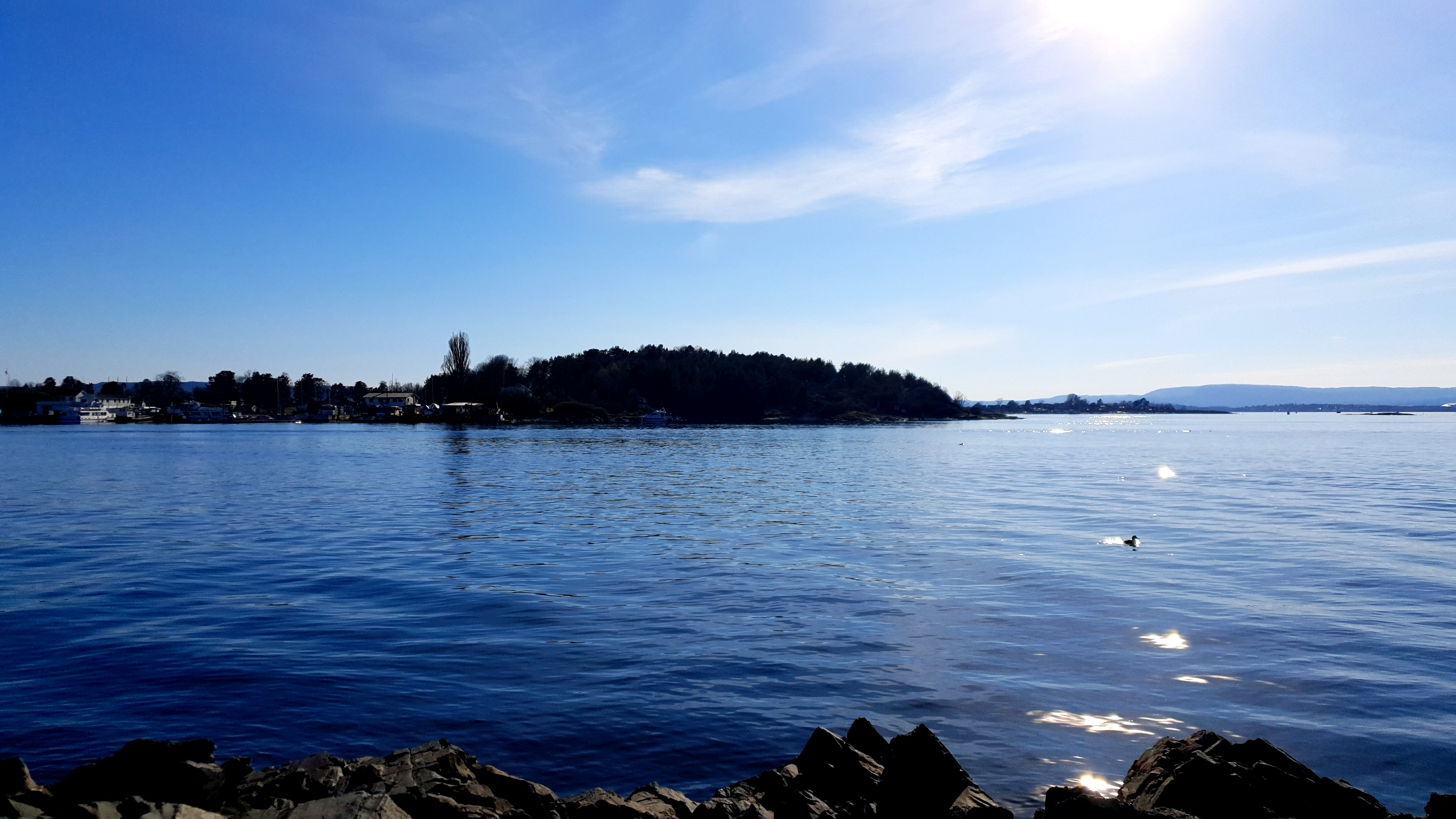

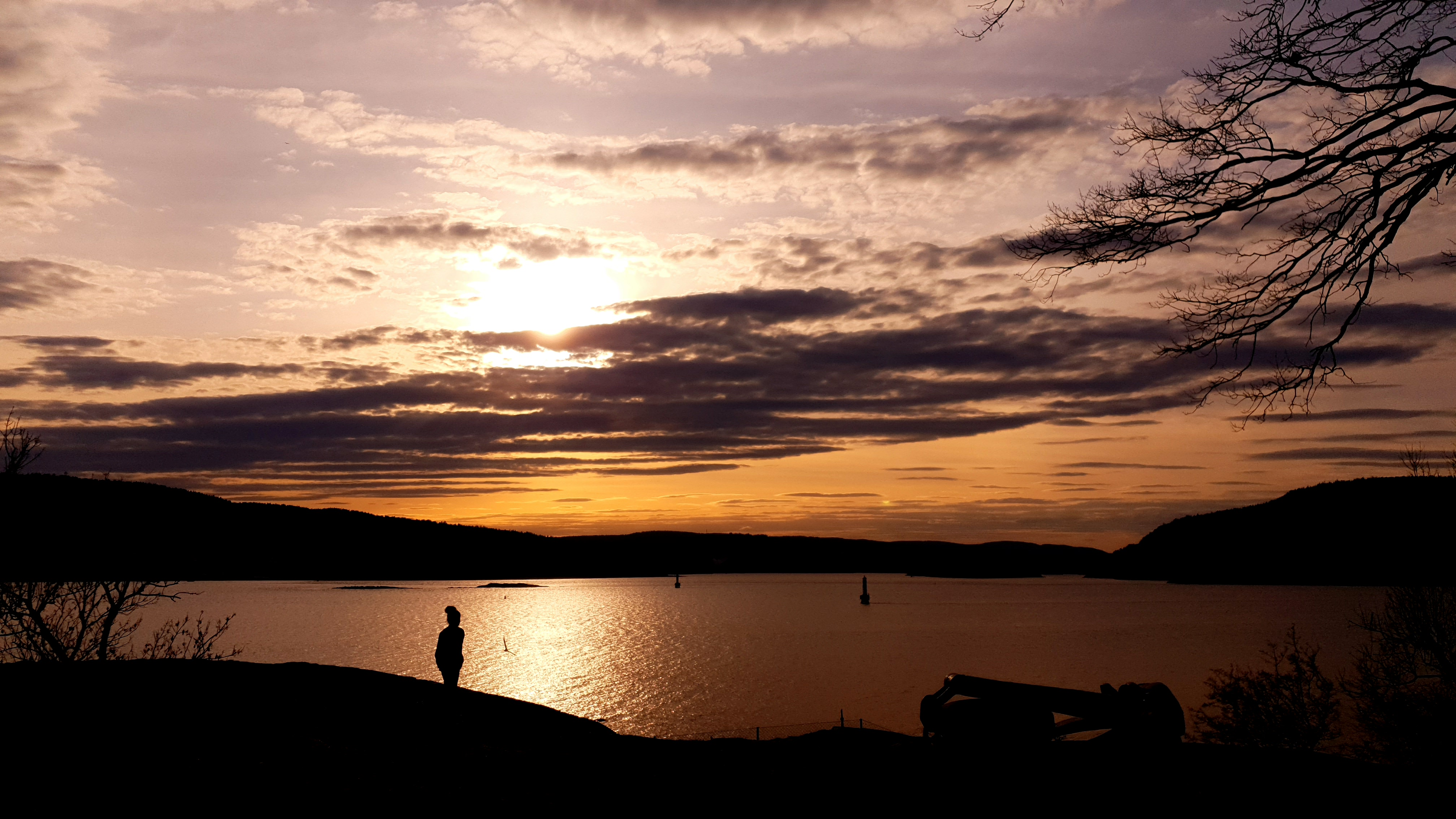

A small aquarium with local species of fish and shellfish is open to the public and shows live video footage of the sea life in the fjord where fish, lobster and crab are often visible to the aquarium visitors. Norsk Luftambulanse used to have its headquarters in Drøbak.

== Etymology ==
The Norse form of the name was Drjúgbakki. The first element is drjúgr 'hard; long', the last element is bakki m '(up)hill'. This is related to the very steep roads winding down into the city centre of Drøbak.

== Drøbak Church ==
Drøbak Church (Drøbak Kirke) is located in Drøbak parish in the Søndre Follo deanery within the Diocese of Borg. The church was opened on 29 October 1776. The church was a gift from the timber merchant, landowner and shipowner Niels Carlsen (1734–1809) and his wife Martha Zachariassen (1743–1821). Significant repairs were made to the church in the 1820s. Domenico Erdmann (1879–1940) led the restoration in conjunction with the 150th anniversary in 1926.

== Places ==
Drøbak is divided into eight notable areas. These places include:

- Gylteåsen, which mainly consists of cabins and "seasonal housing".
- Husvik, where most boats are kept year-round. This area was also significant in the sinking of the German cruiser Blücher in 1940, as the location of the Husvik Battery of Oscarsborg Fortress. The guns of the battery are still in place in these hills as tourist attractions.
- Sentrum (city centre), here lie "Julehuset" and most of the local stores. Most of the city centre is protected by local laws as "Verneverdig", which, in short, means that it has a significant cultural value and cannot be changed or rebuilt. Therefore, much of the city centre looks like it did 100 years ago.
- Skiphelle and Elleflaten, an area consisting of suburban housing and a former hotel called "Drøbak Fjordhotell".
- Sogsti and Ullerud, consisting mostly of Drøbak's suburban housing.
- Odalen and Haveråsen are the "outer banks" of Drøbak, where the housing and population are more agricultural in nature.
- Belsjø and Heer, the suburban housing around the large golf course in northern Drøbak.
- Skorkeberg and Dyrløkke, a large hill of suburban housing. In this area the local mall Drøbak City and a high school are located.

.

== See also ==
- Drøbak Sound
- Battle of Drøbak Sound
