= Seal Nunataks =

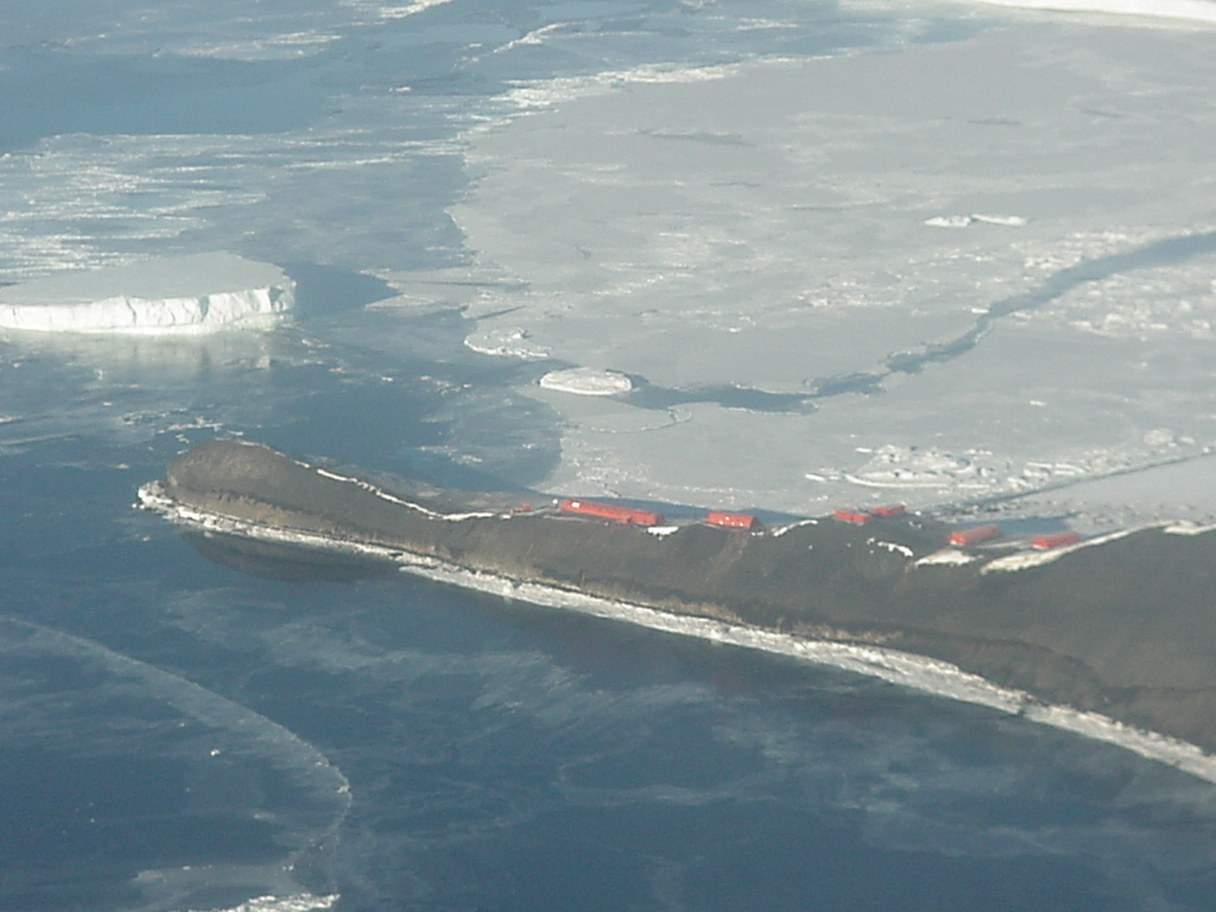
- Larsen Nunatak

Highest point
- Elevation: 368 m (1,207 ft)Murdoch Nunatak
- Coordinates: 65°07′30″S 60°00′00″W

Geography
- Location within Antarctica

Geology
- Mountain type: volcanic vent

The Seal Nunataks are a group of 16 islands called nunataks emerging from the Larsen Ice Shelf east of Graham Land, Antarctic Peninsula. The Seal Nunataks have been described as separate volcanic vents of ages ranging from Miocene to Pleistocene. There are unconfirmed reports of Holocene volcanic activity.

== Geography and geomorphology ==
The Seal Nunataks are part of Graham Land and were embedded within the Larsen Ice Shelf until its northern margin collapsed between 1986 and 1996, rising from about 500 metres (1,600 ft) below sea level. They were discovered by the Norwegian Carl Anton Larsen in December 1893, who also identified them as volcanoes and named them Seal Islands. The Argentina Base Aérea Teniente Benjamín Matienzo is located in the Seal Nunataks.

The Seal Nunataks are part of a volcanic province in West Antarctica which extends over the Antarctic Peninsula, Marie Byrd Land and Ross Island. In the Antarctic Peninsula, Alexander Island, James Ross Island and the Seal Nunataks form this volcanic province. Alexander Island was active between 48 and 18 million years ago. James Ross Island lies about 150 kilometres (93 mi) northeast of the Seal Nunataks.

The Seal Nunataks volcanic group contains at least sixteen volcanic cones, the largest of which is 368 metres (1,207 ft) high Murdoch Nunatak. From north to south they are Lindenberg island, Larsen Nunatak, Evensen Nunatak, Dallmann and Murdoch Nunatak, Akerlundh, Bruce and Bull Nunatak, Donald, Pollux and Christensen Nunatak, Arctowski and Gray Nunatak, Oceana Nunatak, Hertha Nunatak and Castor Nunatak. The nunataks are for the most part tuyas consisting of ridges with lengths of less than 1 to 6 kilometres (0.62 to 3.73 mi) flanked with scree deposits and occasionally by primary volcanic features. According to Otto Nordenskjöld in 1901-1903, Christensen Nunatak features a crater. Castor, Christensen and Hertha are the only vents which show evidence of subaerial activity in form of lava flows; elsewhere the nunataks are constructed by hyaloclastite, pillow lavas and dykes. The volcanoes appear to align along northwest-striking lines.

== Geology ==
The Antarctic Peninsula was a site of subduction from about 200 million years ago until 4 million years ago, when a number of spreading ridges collided with the subduction zone starting from 50 million years ago at Alexander Island and caused it to cease. The volcanic arc became inactive; however volcanic activity continued in different form over the entire peninsula. In the case of the Seal Nunataks, volcanism commenced immediately after subduction had ceased and was probably facilitated by the presence of fracture zones in the already subducted slab. Alternatively, the development of a slab window may have aided in the onset of volcanism. Small volumes of magma ascending would generate the dispersed volcanic fields, like Seal Nunataks.

There is only little evidence of the basement at Robertson Island, where sediments of Cretaceous age crop out. The tectonic structure in the area appears to be a rift bordered by Robertson Island in the south, the Larsen Rift. Lineaments associated with the former subduction of oceanic fracture zones west of the Antarctic Peninsula may have played a role in establishing the alignments of the Seal Nunataks volcanoes.

=== Composition ===
The Seal Nunataks consist of basalt, basalt which contains clinopyroxene, olivine and plagioclase. Andesite and basanite have been reported as well. The rocks define numerous suites, both alkali basalt, subalkaline basalts and basaltic andesites are represented. Xenoliths consisting of lherzolite and spinel have been found at Seal Nunataks. Their geochemistry implies that the magmas are primitive mantle-derived melts which underwent only a little fractional crystallization.

== Eruptive history ==
Potassium-argon dating has yielded ages between 4 million years ago and "recent" for the rocks in the volcanic field, but the reliability of the dates decreases the younger they are. Pillow lavas are usually about 1.5 million years old while subaerial activity occurred 700,000 years ago. The youngest dates were obtained on Donald and Gray, the dates being less than 200,000 years ago. Glacial erratics on some of the nunataks imply that they were covered with glaciers in the past.

The discoverer Captain Larsen observed volcanic activity on Christensen Nunatak and Lindenberg Island, but the reliability of these reports is considered to be unclear. Fumaroles have been observed on Christensen, Dallman and Murdoch, and eruptions were reported on the last two in 1982. This activity consisted of the possible formation of lava flows and a pyroclastic cone, respectively. However, some reported fumarolic activity may be due to solar evaporation of snow, and tephra layers were only found in moraines, implying that it might not have been genuine volcanic eruptions.

== See also ==
- List of volcanoes in Antarctica
