= Luckman =

Luckman is a surname. Notable people with the surname include:

- Adrian Luckman, 20th and 21st century British glaciologist and professor of geology
- Andrew Luckman (born 1972), retired British sport shooter, brother of David Luckman
- Arthur Luckman (1857–1921), Anglican Archdeacon of Calcutta from 1907 to 1911
- Charles Luckman (1909–1999), American businessman, property developer, and architect
- David Luckman (born 1976), British sport shooter
- Ernest Luckman (1926–1988), English rugby league footballer
- Paul Luckman, one of two Australian soldiers who murdered a teenage boy in 1982
- Sid Luckman (1916–1998), American football player
