= Gemini Nunatak =

Nunatak in Graham Land, Antarctica

Gemini Nunatak (66°8′S 62°30′W) is a nunatak consisting of two almost ice-free peaks, 465 and 490 metres (1,530 and 1,610 ft) high, which are connected by a narrow rock ridge, standing 4 nautical miles (7 km) south of Borchgrevink Nunatak on Philippi Rise, on the east coast of Graham Land, Antarctica. It was charted by the Falkland Islands Dependencies Survey (FIDS) and photographed from the air by the Ronne Antarctic Research Expedition in 1947. It was named by the FIDS after the constellation Gemini, which contains the twin stars Castor and Pollux.
