= Argo Point =

Headland in Antarctica

Location of Oscar II Coast on Antarctic Peninsula.

Argo Point (66°15′S 60°55′W) is a prominent rock headland rising steeply to 260 metres (850 ft) on the east side of the Jason Peninsula, 22 nautical miles (41 km) northeast of Veier Head on the east coast of Graham Land. Probably first seen by Carl Anton Larsen in 1893, it was surveyed by the Falkland Islands Dependencies Survey in 1953 and named by the UK Antarctic Place-Names Committee in 1956. The name derives from association with the Jason Peninsula; Jason sailed in the Argo to search for the golden fleece.
