= Cape Marsh =

Cape on Robertson Island in Antarctica

Cape Marsh (65°15′S 59°28′W) is a prominent cape consisting of a rock cliff over 235 metres (770 ft) high, marking the southeastern extremity of Robertson Island on the edge of the Larsen Ice Shelf off Antarctica. Robertson Island was discovered and roughly charted by Captain C.A. Larsen in 1893, and its southern part was resurveyed by the Falkland Islands Dependencies Survey (FIDS) in July, 1953. The cape was named by the UK Antarctic Place-Names Committee for George W. Marsh, FIDS leader and medical officer at Hope Bay, 1952 and 1953.
