= Jason (1881 ship) =

Norwegian whaling vessel

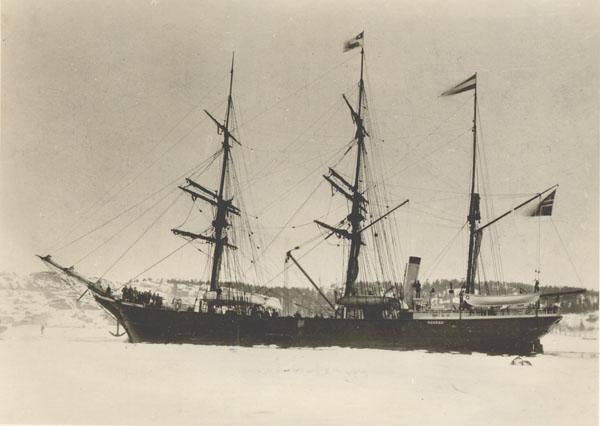
- Jason in Carl Anton Larsen's expedition to Antarctica

History

Norway
- Name: Jason
- Owner: Christen Christensen
- Builder: Rødsverven, Sandefjord,
- Launched: 1881
- Acquired: 1889 A/S Oceana; (Mgr, Christen Christensen)
- Home port: Sandefjord

Italy
- Owner: Luigi Amedeo, Duke of the Abruzzi
- Acquired: 1899
- Renamed: Stella Polare
- Home port: Genoa
- Fate: In July 1909 she was given as training ship to an association in Rome and was taken under tow and anchored at Ripa Grande on the river Tiber, Italy.

General characteristics
- Type: Barque
- Tonnage: 495 gross register tons; 255 net register tons
- Length: 147 ft (45 m)
- Beam: 30.6 ft (9.3 m)
- Draft: 17 ft (5.2 m)
- Propulsion: Sails with steam assisted propulsion 60 hp (45 kW).
- Speed: 7.5 knots (13.9 km/h)
- Complement: 40

Jason was a Norwegian whaling vessel laid down in 1881 by Rødsverven in Sandefjord, Norway, the same shipyard which later built Ernest Shackleton's ship Endurance. The ship, financed by Christen Christensen, an entrepreneur from Sandefjord, was noted for his participation in an 1892–1893 Antarctic expedition led by Carl Anton Larsen.

The vessel reached 68°10'S, and set a new record for distance travelled south along the eastern Antarctic Peninsula. The ship's first mate during the expedition was Søren Andersen, also of Sandefjord. Jason was sold to an Italian company in 1899 and rechristened Stella Polare.

== Usage as Jason ==
In 1888, Fridtjof Nansen captained Jason to Greenland in order to attempt the first documented crossing of the island.

From 1892 to 1894, the ship was used on scientific whaling expeditions to the Antarctic, funded by A/S Oceana. The purpose of these expeditions were to map the presence of whales and seals in the area. During this mission, Jason achieved a record of going the furthest south in the area, reaching 68°10'S.

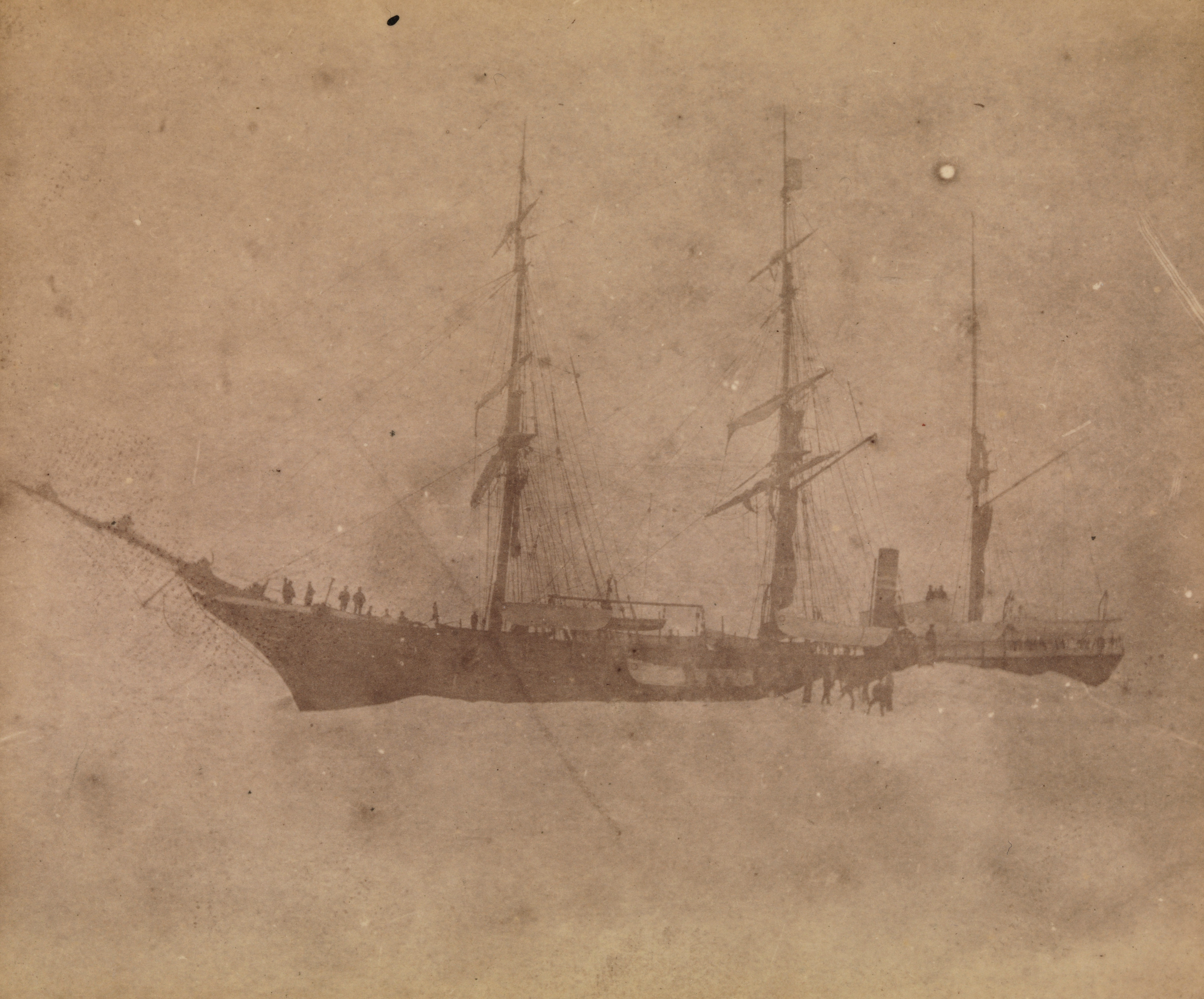
Seal hunting vessel Jason stuck in the ice off Sermilik in 1888. The ship had the members of the Greenland Expedition on board.

=== Geographical locations named after Jason ===
- Jason Peninsula
- Jason Harbour 54°12′S 36°35′W South Georgia
- Jason Island 54°11′S 36°29.5′W South Georgia
- Jason Peak 54°11.5′S 36°37′W South Georgia

=== Antarctic discoveries during Jason's 1892–1893 voyage ===
- Cape Framnes
- Christensen Island: 65°5'S, 58°40'W
- Foyn's Land
- Larsen Ice Shelf
- Mount Jason: 65°44'S, 60°45'W
- Norway Sound (Norske Sund)
- Robertson Island: 65°10′S 59°37′W
- Seal Islands (Sel Øerne)
- Veier Head (Reclassified from Veierø, or Weather Island): 66°26'S, 60°45'W

== Usage as Polar Ship renamed Stella Polare ==
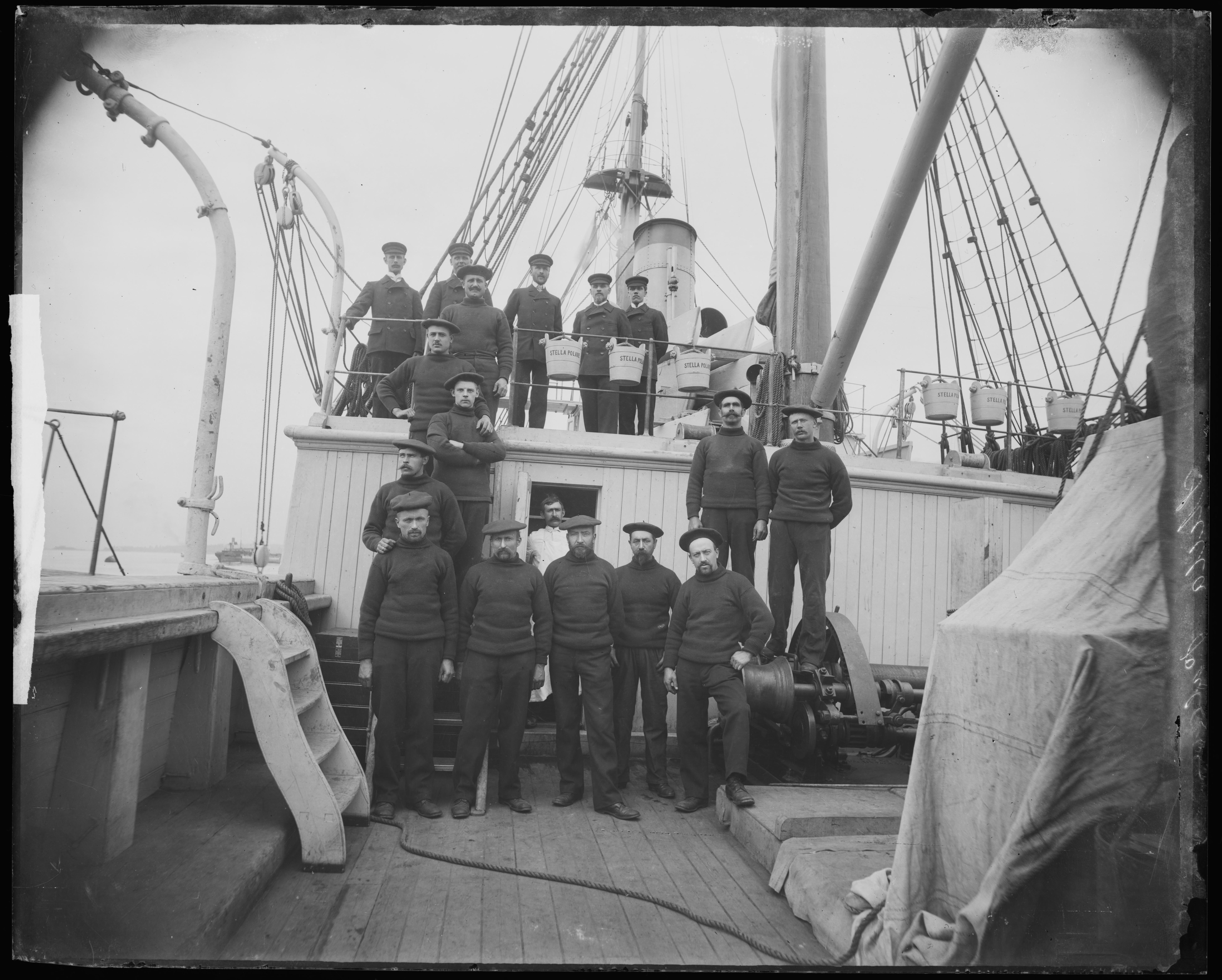
The crew of Stella Polare

In 1898 the Italian prince and explorer Prince Luigi Amedeo, Duke of the Abruzzi wanted to do polar expeditions. He travelled to Norway and consulted the famous polar explorer Fridtjof Nansen that had sailed the furthest north with the Colin Archer built polar ship Fram in 1893–96. In 1899 Amedo bought Jason, renamed her Stella Polare and took her to Colin Archer's shipyard. The interior was stripped out and beams, diagonals and knees heavily strengthened the ship. At the same time, Colin Archer fitted out Southern Cross for polar expeditions and the two ships lay side by side at the yard in Larvik.

Amedeo gathered an expeditionary crew of Italian and Norwegian civilians and sailed from Christiana on 12 June of that year. By the 30th, they had reached Archangel, Russia to load sled dogs onto the ship. Leaving Russia, they headed for Franz Josef Land. They landed in Teplitz Bay in Rudolf Island, with a hope to establish a winter camp for the expedition. From here, they established a string of camps designed to supply each other with food and men. During the expedition, Amedeo lost two fingers to frostbite, and had to hand command of the voyage over to Captain Umberto Cagni. On 25 April 1900, Cagni planted the Italian flag at 86°34'N, claiming the title of "Farthest North."

After Amedeo's uncle, King Umberto I of Italy, was killed in July 1900, the widow made a silver replica of Stella Polare at a cost of 12.000 lire and placed it at the Virgin Mary's wonder-working picture in the Turin Cathedral, Italy.

In July 1909 the Stella Polare was given as training ship for an association in Rome. She was taken under tow from the arsenal in La Spezia and anchored at Ripa Grande in the river Tiber, a little upstream of the Aventine Hill. There she caught fire, but a part of the bow was saved and put in the museum of Milano.
