= Faravelli =

Faravelli is an Italian surname. Notable people with the surname include:

- Lorenzo Faravelli (born 1993), Argentine footballer
- Luigi Faravelli (1852–1914), Italian admiral
