= Medea Dome =

Mountain in Antarctica

Location of Oscar II Coast on Antarctic Peninsula.

Medea Dome (66°11′S 62°3′W) is a snow dome, 350 metres (1,150 ft) high, marking the eastern end of Philippi Rise on the east coast of Graham Land, Antarctica. It was surveyed by the Falkland Islands Dependencies Survey in 1953, and was named in 1956 by the UK Antarctic Place-Names Committee in association with Jason Peninsula; in Greek mythology Medea helped Jason to obtain the Golden Fleece and later became his wife.
