= Pelias Bluff =

Location of Oscar II Coast on Antarctic Peninsula.

Pelias Bluff (66°4′S 61°23′W) is a conspicuous rock bluff rising to more than 150 meters at the head of the inlet lying immediately west of Standring Inlet, on the north coast of Jason Peninsula in Graham Land (Southern Ocean) . It was surveyed by the Falkland Islands Dependencies Survey (FIDS) in 1953.

Pelias Bluff was named in 1956 by the United Kingdom Antarctic Place-Names Committee (UK-APC) in association with Jason Peninsula. Pelias, who was Jason's uncle, deprived Jason of his kingdom. Pelias was later killed through the agency of Medea.
