= Battle of Tripoli (1911) =

Part of the Italo-Turkish War

- Part of the Italo-Turkish War
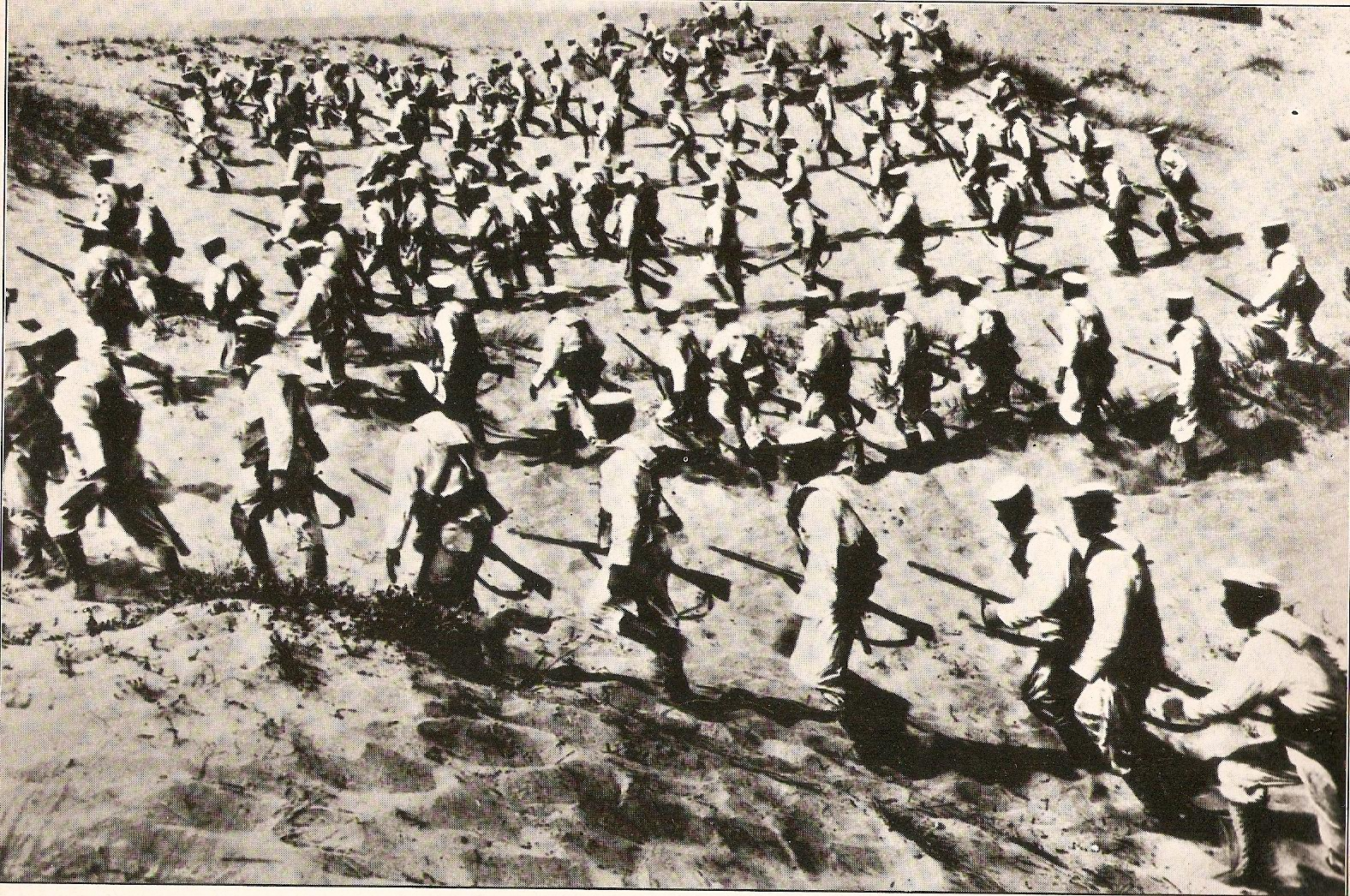
- Italian Navy landing sailors on the beach of Tripoli
Date	3–10 October 1911
Location	Tripoli, Tripolitania, Ottoman Empire (now Libya) 32°53′14.02″N 13°11′28.84″E
Result	Italian victory
Territorial changes	Italians occupy Tripoli

Belligerents
(Kingdom of Italy) Italy	Ottoman Empire

Commanders and leaders
Luigi Faravelli; Umberto Cagni	Neshat Bey

Strength
1,700 troops 4 battleships 4 armoured cruisers 1 protected cruiser	3,000 troops 1 gunboat

The Battle of Tripoli was fought in October 1911, during the initial stages of the Italo-Turkish War, and saw the capture of Tripoli, capital city of Tripolitania (and present-day Libya), by Italian landing forces. It marked the beginning of the land campaign in Libya of the Italo-Turkish War as well as the beginning of the Italian colonization of Libya.

== Background ==
The Kingdom of Italy, seeking to conquer Libya from the Ottoman Empire, declared war on the Ottoman Empire on 29 September 1911, starting the Italo-Turkish War. After the declaration of war, an Italian naval squadron under Admiral Luigi Faravelli was sent to patrol the Libyan coast, especially the waters off Tripoli; the Italian government wanted the fleet to bombard the forts of Tripoli, but Faravelli initially refrained from this, as he feared this would cause retaliation from the local Arab population against the Europeans living in the city, estimated to be about 2,000. Faravelli offered to take foreign citizens aboard his ships, but the consuls of the neutral countries stated that they felt protected enough by the Ottoman authorities, therefore only the Italian citizens, including many journalists that had rushed to Libya to follow the events as they unfolded (among them Luigi Barzini and Corrado Zoli), were taken aboard.

Between 29 and 30 September an attempt was made to launch a torpedo launch with the aim of torpedoing the Turkish steamer Derna, that in the previous days had run the Italian blockade, carrying a cargo of weapons, and was now moored in the harbour. The rough seas, however, prevented the torpedoes from being embarked on the launch, therefore the attempt was abandoned.

== Naval bombardment ==
On 2 October 1911, the Italian squadron was deployed in front of Tripoli harbour, in anticipation of the arrival from Italy of an expeditionary force that would be landed in Libya; the ships were also tasked with preventing the arrival of supplies and reinforcements from Turkey. Faravelli was ordered to demand the surrender of the Ottoman garrison and, in case of refusal, to commence hostilities; the admiral complained that the Army troops were not yet ready to be sent ashore and the landing parties of his ships were numerically insufficient, but Rome sent another telegram urging immediate action. Faravelli then invited the Turkish defterdar, Ahmed Bessim Bey, aboard his flagship, and he commanded him to surrender the city; Bessim Bey refused and tried to buy time, claiming that he was unable to contact Istanbul and ask for instruction. During this encounter, Colonel Neshat Bey ordered all the Ottoman troops in Tripoli, some 2,000 men, to leave the city and to quarter at ‘Aziziya, about ten kilometres from Tripoli.

Tripoli was defended by two main forts, Fort Hamidiye east of the city and Fort Sultaniye west of the city, as well as smaller fortifications in the harbour area; following Colonel Neshat Bey's orders, however, these fortifications were only partially manned. At 15:30 on 3 October, the Italian squadron opened fire on the forts: the battleship Benedetto Brin fired first, soon followed by the battleship Emauele Filiberto and by the armoured cruisers Giuseppe Garibaldi and Carlo Alberto. The ships commenced their bombardment from a distance of 9,500 meters, outside of the range of the forts' guns, and gradually closened; at 16:15, when the distance had been reduced to 6,500 meters, the ships' 152 mm secondaries also opened fire. At 17:15 the ships ceased fire; all the Ottoman forts were severely damaged, and their guns silenced. No significant damage was inflicted to the civilian buildings. The only Ottoman warship present in Tripoli, the gunboat Seyyad, was scuttled by her crew during the bombardment, and the steamer Derna suffered the same fate (she was later raised and commissioned into the Italian Navy as an auxiliary ship).

On the following day, 4 October, the Italian squadron bombarded once more the Ottoman forts; only Fort Sultaniye returned fire, firing a few sporadic shots. An Italian patrol was sent ashore and found out that Fort Hamidiye had been abandoned; the German consul, Alfred Tilger, informed the members of the patrol that the Ottoman troops had abandoned Tripoli, and asked them to occupy the city in order to prevent looting.

== Landing ==
On 5 October, the Italian command took the decision of deploying the Italian Navy's landing force, under Captain Umberto Cagni. This force consisted of two regiments, each made of three battalions, of which one (Commander Mario Grassi, from the battleship Sardegna) drew its personnel from the Training Ship Division, and the other (Commander Enrico Bonelli, from the battleship Re Umberto) drew its personnel from the 1st and 2nd Naval Division. The landing began at 7:30 on 5 October; the men from battleship Sicilia were the first to land, followed by those from Sardegna and by an artillery section. There was no reaction, and the men occupied Fort Sultaniye and prepared the defenses. Afterwards, the men from the Re Umberto were also sent ashore with four artillery pieces, and at noon the Italian flag was raised upon the fort. At the same time, a sapper unit occupied Fort Hamidiye, at the other end of the harbour, and at 16:30 the entire second regiment was sent ashore and reached Tripoli's marketplace, where they met up with the men of the first regiment.

Captain Cagni organised immediately a defense line in order to safeguard the landing area. As the landing force was the only force available to hold the city (the convoy with the Army troops had not yet sailed from Naples and Palermo, and would not arrive for a few days), the situation for the Italians was rather dangerous, as a counterattack by the numerically superior Ottoman forces, that had retreated a few kilometres from Tripoli, could have overwhelmed the Italian bridgehead. Cagni, however, managed to trick the Turks into thinking that his forces were far more numerous than they actually were, by having his troops continually march from place to place in the city. This ruse managed to delay Ottoman counterattacks for a week; in the meantime, Admiral Raffaele Borea Ricci d'Olmo, who had been appointed provisional Governor of Tripolitania, tried to keep good relations with the Arab leaders of the city, who accepted the occupation without much opposition. The mayor of Tripoli Hassan Karamanli, whom had been appointed by the Ottoman authorities, was confirmed in his office and was also appointed as deputy governor of Tripolitania by the Italian authorities.

== Fighting at Bu Meliana and arrival of reinforcements ==
On the night between 9 and 10 October the Ottoman troops, supported by Libyan irregulars, attacked the Italian positions in the area of the Bu Meliana wells, south of Tripoli, the main source of water for the city. The attack was repelled with the help of gunfire from the warships moored in the roads. This attack prompted the Italian commands to speed up the transport of the Army troops to Tripoli, in order to reinforce the scarce Navy forces that were still holding the city; the armoured cruiser Varese and the troopships America and Verona, being the fastest ships in the troop convoy that had sailed from Italy, detached from the convoy and proceeded towards Tripoli at a higher speed. They reached destination on 11 October, and they landed the 84th Infantry Brigade (Brigade "Venezia"), two battalions of the 40th Infantry Brigade (Brigade "Bologna") and a battalion of the 11th Bersaglieri Regiment, altogether 4,800 men. On the following day, the remainder of the convoy also reached Tripoli; with these reinforcements, the Italian forces occupying the city grew to 35,000 men, under the command of General Carlo Caneva. After the arrival of the Army forces, Captain Cagni's naval landing personnel were re-embarked on their ships.

Most of the Turkish garrison, however, remained intact; having retreated into the desert, as planned beforehand, they established bases outside of the range of the warships' guns and started recruiting Arab volunteers. A few weeks later, the Turkish and Arab forces would attempt to retake Tripoli in the battle of Sciara Sciat], but without success.

== See also ==
- Italo-Turkish War
