= Veier Head =

Antarctic headland

Location of Oscar II Coast on Antarctic Peninsula.

Veier Head (66°29′S 61°42′W) is a high, snow-covered headland which marks the southernmost point of Jason Peninsula on the east coast of Graham Land. Norwegian explorer Captain C.A. Larsen discovered what he charted as an island in this vicinity on December 9, 1893. The feature was first seen by Soren Andersen First Mate of the Jason (ship), and was named "Veieroen" after his home, Veierland or Veieroen, in Norway. It is possible that Larsen mistook this high southern part of Jason Peninsula (which agrees well with his position and is conspicuous from seaward) for a separate island. In order to preserve Larsen's original name in the area, the name Veier Head has been approved for the headland described.
