= Standring Inlet =

Body of water in Graham Land, Antarctica

Standring Inlet (66°0′S 61°3′W) is the easternmost of three inlets on the north coast of Jason Peninsula, Graham Land. It is 9 nautical miles (17 km) long and is filled with ice shelf. Surveyed by the Falkland Islands Dependencies Survey (FIDS) in 1953. Named in 1956 by the FIDS for Anthony J. Standring, geologist at Hope Bay in 1953 and 1954, who visited Jason Peninsula with the survey party.
