= Adrian Luckman =

British glaciologist and geology professor

Adrian J. Luckman
- Education: University of York
- Scientific career
- Fields: Glaciology
- Workplaces: Swansea University

Adrian J. Luckman is a British glaciologist and professor of geography at Swansea University in Wales. He is a lead researcher for Project Midas, which monitored the Larsen C iceberg and the Larsen Ice Shelf.

== Biography ==
Luckman received a Bachelor of Science and a DPhil in electronic engineering from the University of York in 1987 and 1991, respectively. As of 2021 he holds a personal chair in the Geography department at Swansea University.
