= Cape Framnes =

Cape on the coast of Graham Land, Antarctica

Coordinates: 65°57′S 60°33′W

Location of Oscar II Coast on Antarctic Peninsula.

Cape Framnes is a cape which forms the northeast end of Jason Peninsula, on the east coast of Graham Land, Antarctica. It was discovered and named in 1893 by a Norwegian expedition under C.A. Larsen. The name is probably descriptive. Larsen reported that he gave the name Framnes (forward point) to the promontory which shoots off in an eastern direction from "Mount Jason" (now Jason Peninsula). He said it appeared to be the most advanced point of land which his expedition saw here.
