= Luigi Faravelli =

Italian admiral (1852–1914)

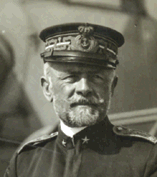

Senator of the Kingdom of Italy
- In office 17 March 1912 – 22 March 1914
- Monarch: Victor Emmanuel III

Personal details
- Born: 15 September 1852 Stradella, Lombardy–Venetia, Austrian Empire
- Died: 22 February 1914 (aged 61) Rome, Kingdom of Italy

Military service
- Allegiance: Kingdom of Italy
- Branch/service: Regia Marina
- Years of service: 1905–1912
- Rank: Rear Admiral (1905–1911); Vice Admiral (1911–1912)
- Commands: 2nd Naval Squadron
- Battles/wars: Italo-Turkish War: Battle of Tripoli
- Awards: Order of the Crown of Italy; Order of Saints Maurice and Lazarus; Military Order of Savoy; Maurician medal Cross for seniority of service Commemorative Medal for the Italo-Turkish War 1911-1912; Commemorative Medal for the Italo-Austrian War 1915–1918; Commemorative Medal of the Unity of Italy; Allied Victory Medal

Luigi Giuseppe Faravelli (29 October 1852 – 22 March 1914) was an Italian admiral who fought in the Italo-Turkish War.

== Military service ==
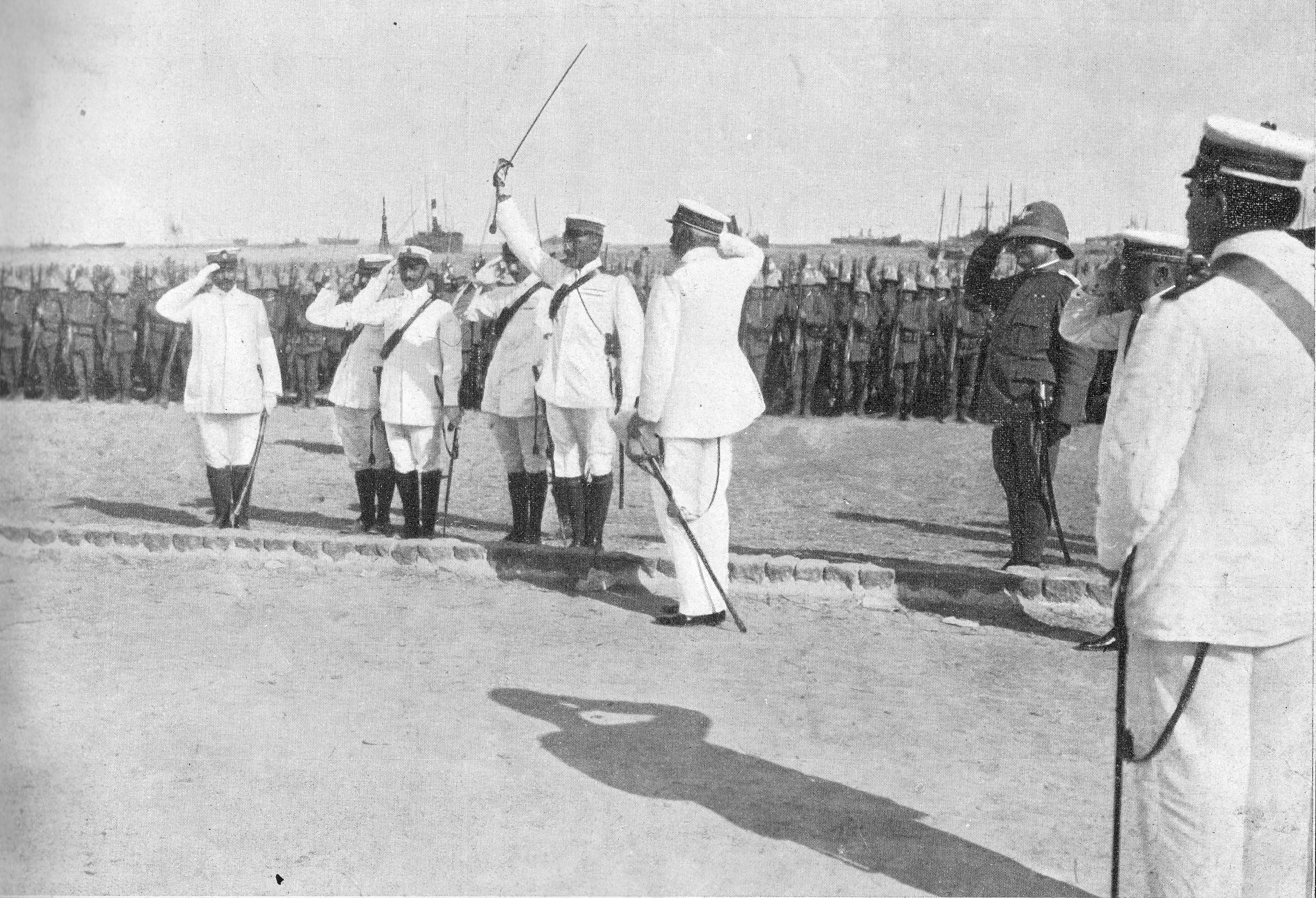
Admiral Faravelli and Captain Cagni in Tripoli at the handover with the Royal Italian Army.

Not much is known about his history prior to his naval career but he first entered service as Rear Admiral in 1905, then promoted to Vice Admiral in 1911. His most notable accomplishment was participating in the Italo-Turkish War where he commanded the 2nd Naval Squadron, which on 2 October 1911 deployed in front of the port of Tripoli, where he had the task of keeping the waters safe in view of the planned landing of the Italian expeditionary force and prevent the influx of reinforcements and supplies from the Ottoman Empire. On 5 October 1911 Faravelli accepted the surrender of the city of Tripoli from the local notables and the German consul Adrian Tilger and to issue on the 6th the famous proclamation to the Libyans with which among other things he declared:

"In the name of His Majesty, the King of Italy we assure you not only respect for your complete freedom, your religion, but also respect for all your possessions, your women, your customs. We announce that the conscription, possible economic improvements will be given to you and that we consider you as of now strictly linked to Italy"

After the war, he was President of the Superior Council of the Navy in 1912, as well as Senator of the Kingdom from 17 March 1912.

He died in Rome in 1914 and to this day he is buried in the family tomb in the cemetery of Stradella.

The institute for surveyors and accountants of Stradella (Pv) and the Liceo Scientifico of Broni (Pv) are named in his honor.
