= Robertson Island =

Island off the coast of the Antarctic Peninsula

- Location of Robertson Island

- Location in Antarctica

Geography
- Location: Antarctica
- Coordinates: 65°10′S 59°37′W
- Length: 21 km (13 mi)
- Width: 10 km (6 mi)

Administration
- Administered under the Antarctic Treaty System

Demographics
- Population: Uninhabited

Robertson Island is an ice-covered island, 21 km (13 mi) long in a northwest-southeast direction and 10 km (6 mi) wide, lying at the east end of the Seal Nunataks off the east coast of the Antarctic Peninsula. Captain Carl Anton Larsen discovered Robertson Island from the Jason on 9 December 1893. Curious to find out if the volcano was active he skied to the top from the north side of the island, later naming it Mt. Christensen after his longtime partner and majority owner of the Jason, Christen Christensen. Larsen named Robertson Island for William Robertson, co-owner of the Hamburg-based company Woltereck & Robertson.

== San Roque Refuge ==
San Roque Refuge (65°14′40″S 59°26′38″W) was an Argentine Antarctic refuge located on Robertson Island at the east end of the Foca nunataks off the Nordenskjöld coast east of the Antarctic Peninsula. The shelter was opened on 1 October 1956, and was administered by the Argentine Army. The refuge had been occupied and used in various operations and currently is inactive. It is one of the 18 shelters that are under the responsibility of the Esperanza Base, which is responsible for the maintenance and the care.

== See also ==
- Cape Marsh
- Composite Antarctic Gazetteer
- List of Antarctic and sub-Antarctic islands
- List of Antarctic field camps
- List of Antarctic islands south of 60° S
- SCAR
- Territorial claims in Antarctica

== Sources ==
- Mills, William James (2003). Exploring Polar Frontiers A Historical Encyclopedia. London: ABC-CLIO Publishing. ISBN 1-57607-422-6.
- Yelverton, David E. (2004). Quest for a phantom strait : the saga of the pioneer Antarctic Peninsula expeditions, 1897-1905. New York: Guildford. pp. Intro XII. ISBN 0-9548003-0-3.
