= Jason Peninsula =

Large peninsula in Antarctica

Location of Oscar II Coast on Antarctic Peninsula.

Jason Peninsula (66°10′S 61°0′W) is a large peninsula on the east coast of Graham Land comprising several mainly snow-covered summits. It rises above the Larsen Ice Shelf and extends from the narrow neck of land east of Medea Dome for 42 nautical miles (78 km), terminating in Cape Framnes. This feature was first seen from seaward on December 1, 1893, by Carl Anton Larsen, who named one of the high peaks "Mount Jason" after his ship, the Jason. Larsen was too distant to map the area in detail, but in 1902 the Swedish Antarctic Expedition under Otto Nordenskiöld observed the area from Borchgrevink Nunatak and reported the peaks seen by Larsen to be separated from the mainland. The name "Jason Island" was subsequently used for Larsen's discovery, but in 1955 the Falkland Islands Dependencies Survey determined this feature to be a large peninsula.

== See also ==
- Argo Point
- Pelias Bluff
