= Philippi Rise =

Mountain in Antarctica

Location of Oscar II Coast on Antarctic Peninsula.

Philippi Rise (66°6′S 62°18′W) is a low, snow-covered promontory 7 nautical miles (13 km) wide and extending some 10 nautical miles (18 km) southeast from the east coast of Graham Land. The ice surface is highest in the west, where it rises to about 395 m and is broken by Borchgrevink and Gemini Nunataks. The Swedish Antarctic Expedition under Nordenskjold, 1901–04, reported an ice wall or glacial terrace in the vicinity of Borchgrevink Nunatak. Although unable to determine its nature, Nordenskjold named the feature Philippigletscher, after Emil Philippi. It was determined to be a snow-covered promontory by the Falkland Islands Dependencies Survey (FIDS) during their 1947 survey of this coast.
