= Arthur Luckman =

Archdeacon of Calcutta

William Arthur Grant Luckman (25 June 1857 – 8 January 1921) was Archdeacon of Calcutta from 1907 to 1911.

Luckman was educated at Keble College, Oxford and ordained in 1881. He was a Master at the Boys’ High School, Allahabad from 1882 to 1886; Chaplain of St Paul's Cathedral, Calcutta from 1896 to 1893; the Incumbent at St John, Calcutta from 1893 to 1895; and a Canon at St Paul's from 1895 to 1907. After his time as Archdeacon he was the Minister of St Cuthbert, Edinburgh until his death.
