= Iceberg A-68 =

Antarctic iceberg from the Larsen C Ice Shelf in July 2017

- Tabular iceberg
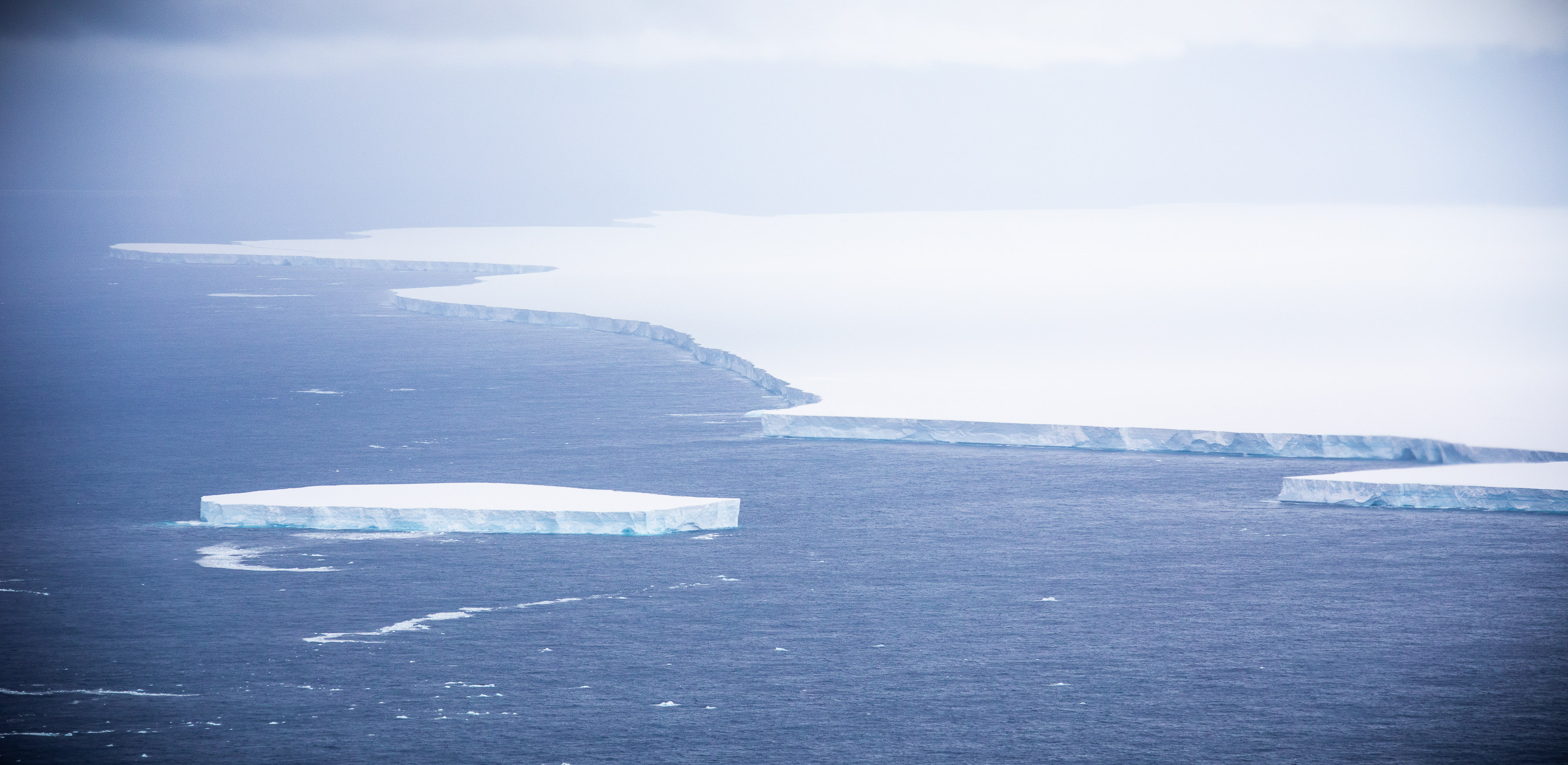
- A-68A on 18 November 2020
- Part of: Larsen C ice shelf (originally)
- Water bodies: South Atlantic

Area
  - Total: 5,800 km^{2} (2,200 mi^{2}) (at break)

Dimensions
  - Length: 175 km (109 mi) (at break)
  - Width: 50 km (31 mi) (at break)

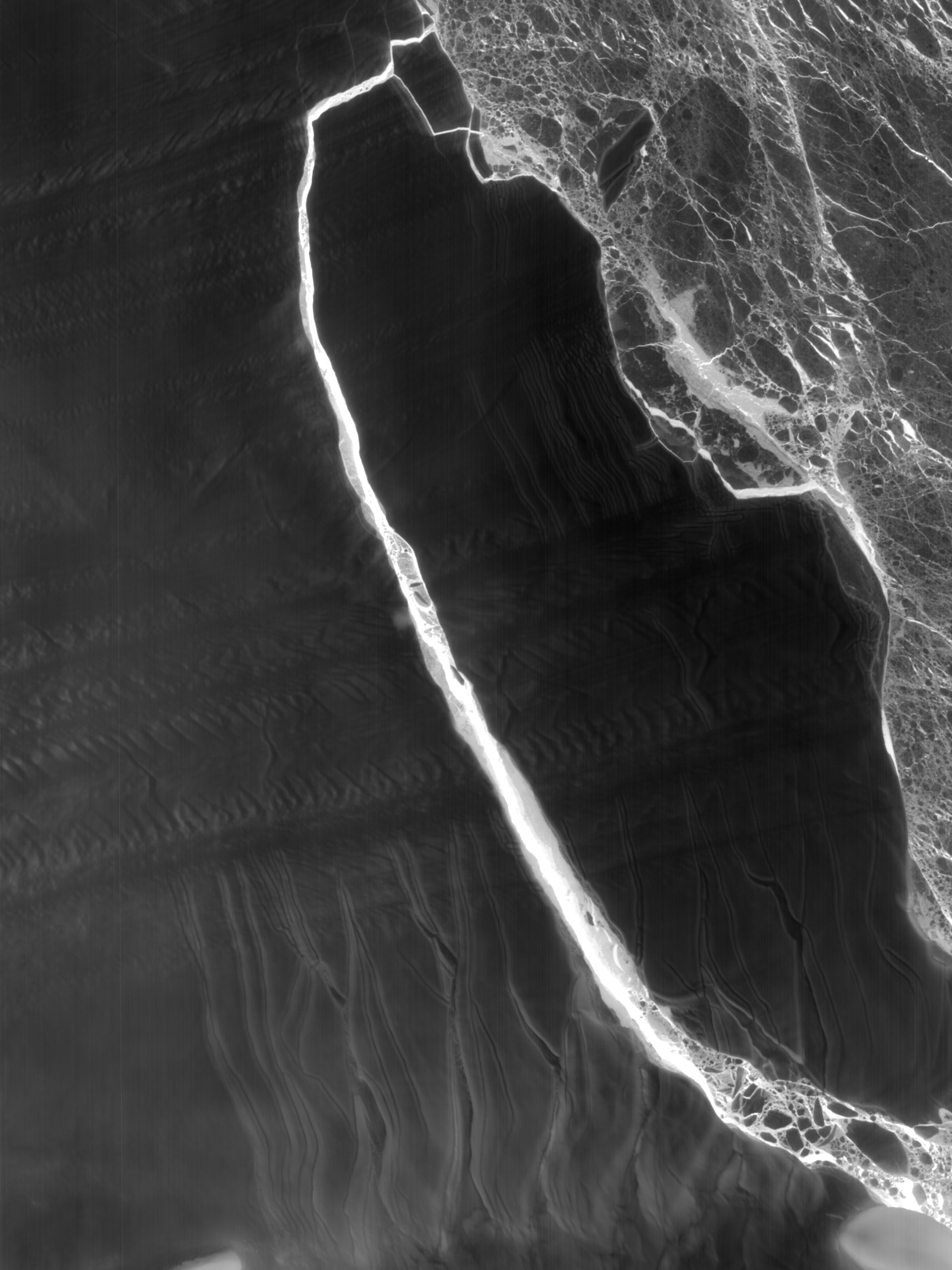
Iceberg A-68 on 20 July 2017

The drift of Iceberg A-68A from 1 May 2018 to 26 August 2018

Iceberg A-68 was a giant tabular iceberg adrift in the South Atlantic, having calved from Antarctica's Larsen C ice shelf in July 2017. By 16 April 2021, no significant fragments remained.

With a surface area of 5,800 square kilometres (2,200 mi^{2}), twice the size of Luxembourg, over a quarter the size of Wales, and larger than Delaware, it was one of the largest recorded icebergs, the largest being B-15 which measured 11,000 square kilometres (4,200 mi^{2}) before breaking up. The calving of A-68 reduced the overall size of the Larsen C shelf by 12 percent.

Historical data shows that many icebergs that break off from the Antarctic Peninsula reach South Georgia and the South Sandwich Islands.

The name "A-68" was assigned by the US National Ice Center. It broke into parts with the mother berg dubbed A-68A. The larger child icebergs were designated in order of birthing, as A-68B, A-68C, A-68D, A-68E, A-68F, and in January 2021, splitting almost in half to birth A-68G. On 30 January 2021, Iceberg A-68A broke into other icebergs called A-68H, A-68I, A-68J, A-68K, A-68L, A-68M.

== History and recent developments ==
A-68 was part of Larsen C, a section of the Larsen Ice Shelf. Scientists found the crack beginning to form in November 2016. Scientists assess that A-68 "didn't just break through in one clean shot, [but] it formed a lace-network of cracks first." The resulting iceberg was around 175 km (109 mi) long and 50 km (31 mi) wide, 5,800 km^{2} (2,200 mi^{2}) in area, 200 m (660 ft) thick and weighed an estimated one trillion tonnes.

Satellite images from the ESA and EU's Copernicus Program show that as the iceberg moved, it was gradually shrinking and splintering, forming more icebergs in the process.

Scientists were looking into the possibility of the ice shelf collapsing as a result of the split with A-68, or whether the iceberg was the "cork" for Larsen C that allows ice to flow more freely into the sea, thereby contributing to rising sea levels.

Post November 2017, satellite images showed that A-68 was slowly drifting northward, with a widening gap to the main shelf. The gap was approximately five kilometers (3.1 miles) wide and contained a thin layer of loose, floating ice and a cluster of more than 11 'smaller' bergs, one much larger than the others.

A British expedition on RRS James Clark Ross intended to sample the marine life at the A-68 cleavage line in March 2018, but had to turn back due to thick sea ice. During 2018, A-68 continued to drift northwards. In 2018 or 2019, a large chunk almost 14 km × 8 km (9 miles × 5 miles) broke off and was named A-68B, with the mother iceberg now being A-68A.

On 6 February 2020, A-68A began moving into open waters. On 23 April 2020, a chunk measuring about 175 sq. km. (70 sq. mi.) broke off the iceberg and was named A-68C.

On 4 November 2020, it was reported that A-68A was approaching South Georgia Island and that there was a strong possibility that the iceberg might run aground on the shallower continental shelf near the island, posing a grave threat to local penguins and seals.

On 9 December 2020, the Royal Air Force released video footage of A-68A, 150 km off South Georgia. The RAF conducted reconnaissance flights over the iceberg on 18 November and 5 December 2020.

As of 17 December 2020, a part of the iceberg was just 50 km (31 mi) from South Georgia, but the concern seemed to have lessened. National Geographic reported that "[s]cientists expect the iceberg ... to either anchor in the shallow waters around the island or move past it in the coming days." On this date it was also reported that a corner had been knocked off A-68A, most likely due to impact with the seabed. The new free floating iceberg was designated A-68D.

On 22 December 2020, images from ESA's Sentinel-1 radar satellite showed that A-68A had experienced a major break-up. Two of the larger fragments were named A-68E and A-68F. A modeling study demonstrated that this break-up was likely triggered when part of A-68A became positioned within stronger ocean currents than the rest of the berg, generating enough tension along its body to break it into pieces.

On 28 January 2021, Sentinel-1 discovered that the southern third of A-68A had broken away. The new segment was named A-68G, with an area of around 950 square kilometres (370 mi^{2}). The imagery shows these two bergs around 135 km south-east of South Georgia drifting close together.

On 30 January 2021, Iceberg A-68A broke up into other icebergs called A-68H, A-68I, A-68J, A-68K, A-68L, and A-68M.

On 15 February 2021, it was reported that British scientists had arrived at the remnants of A-68A, and had deployed a robotic glider to measure seawater salinity, temperature and chlorophyll close to the remaining blocks of ice to ascertain effects on local marine life.

On 16 April 2021, the largest fragment was down to 3 nautical miles in length and the U.S. National Ice Center, which names, tracks, and documents Antarctic icebergs, discontinued tracking, as the Center only studies icebergs that are at least 20 sq. nautical miles, or that measure 10 nautical miles on the longest axis.

== Gallery ==
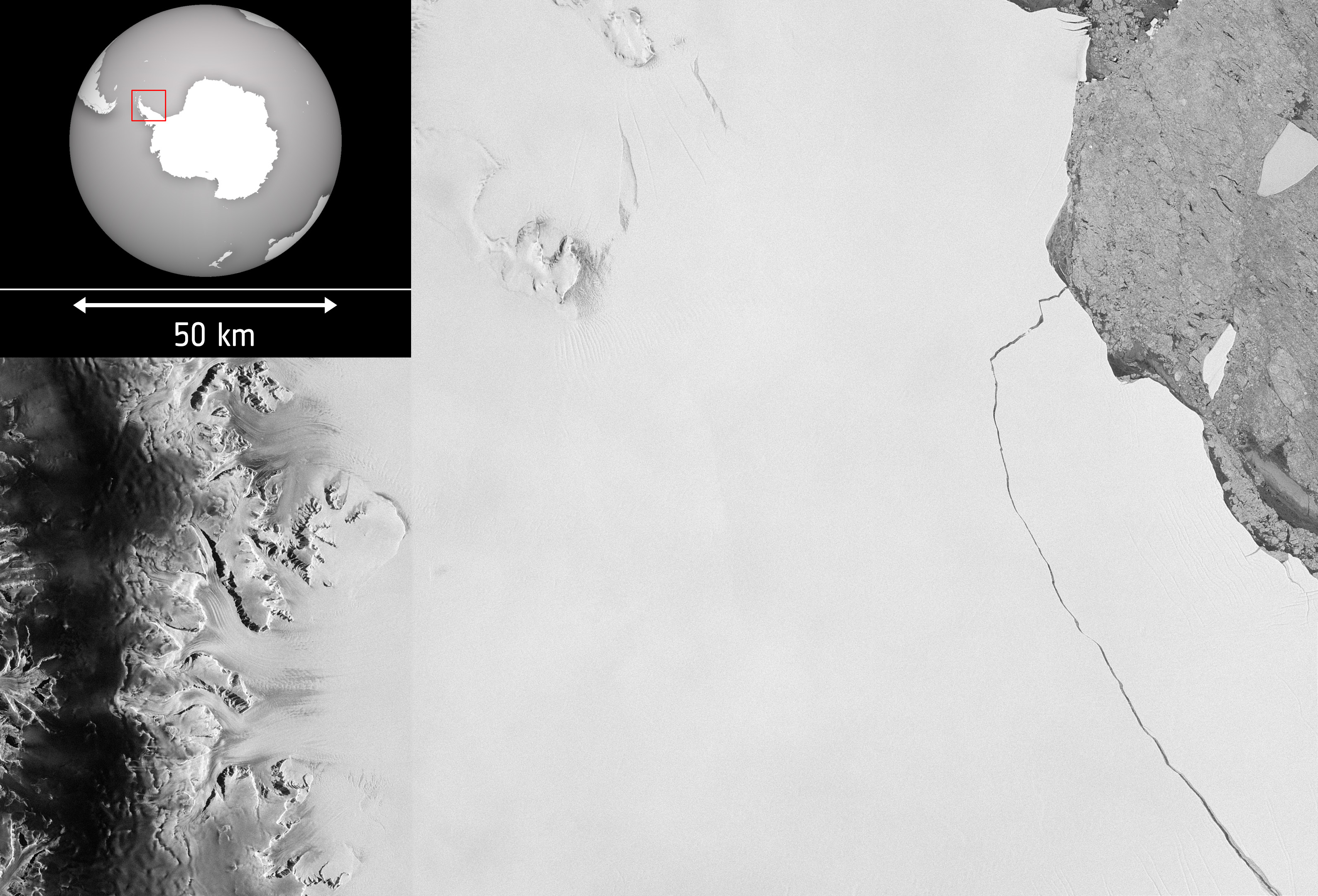
Radar imagery from Sentinel-1B taken on 12 July 2017, showing the complete break

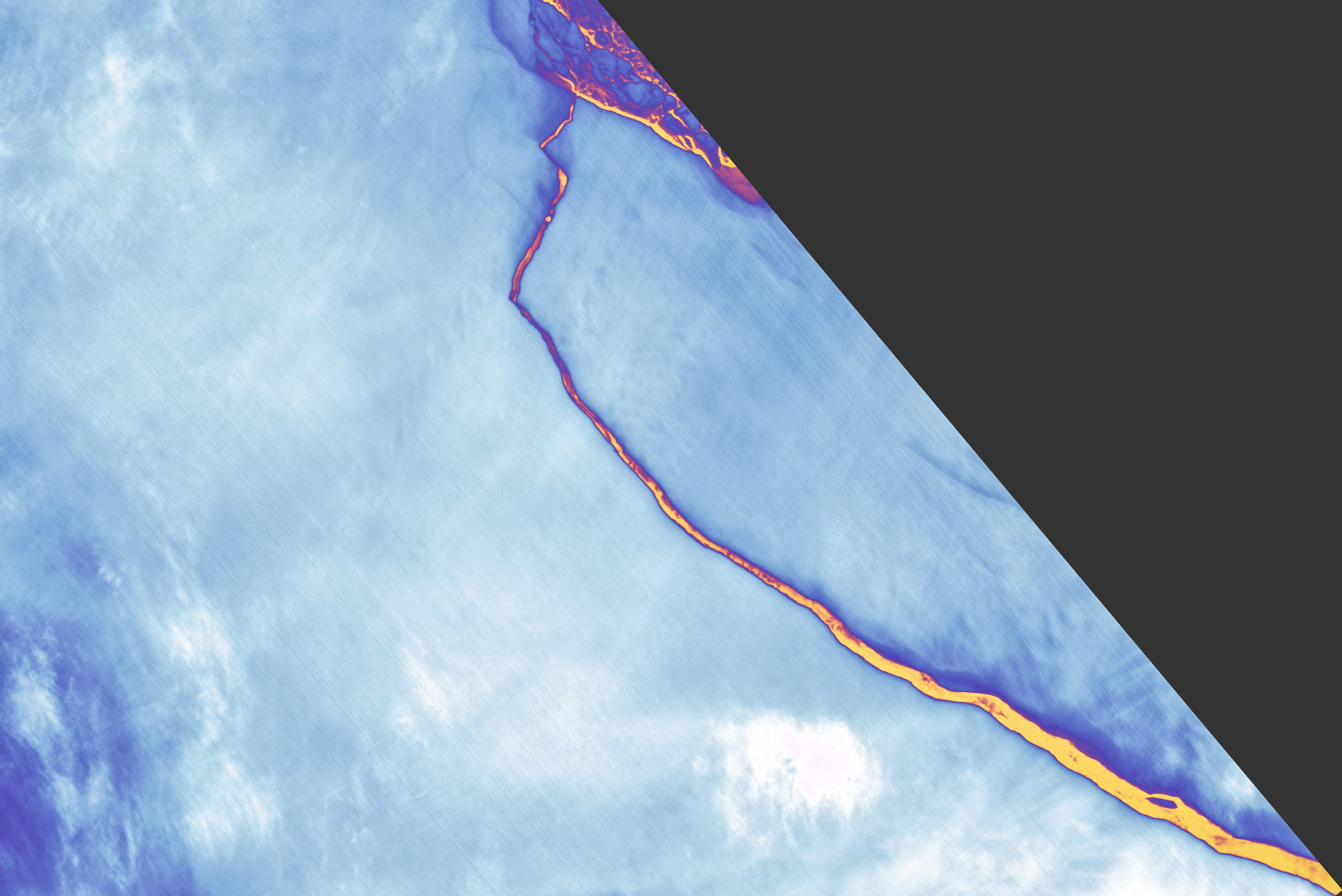
A-68 on 12 July 2017

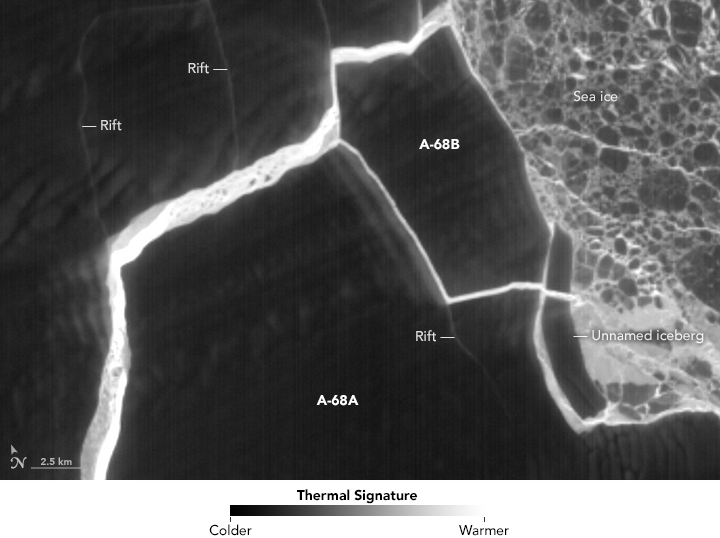
Close-up of A-68 on 20 July 2017

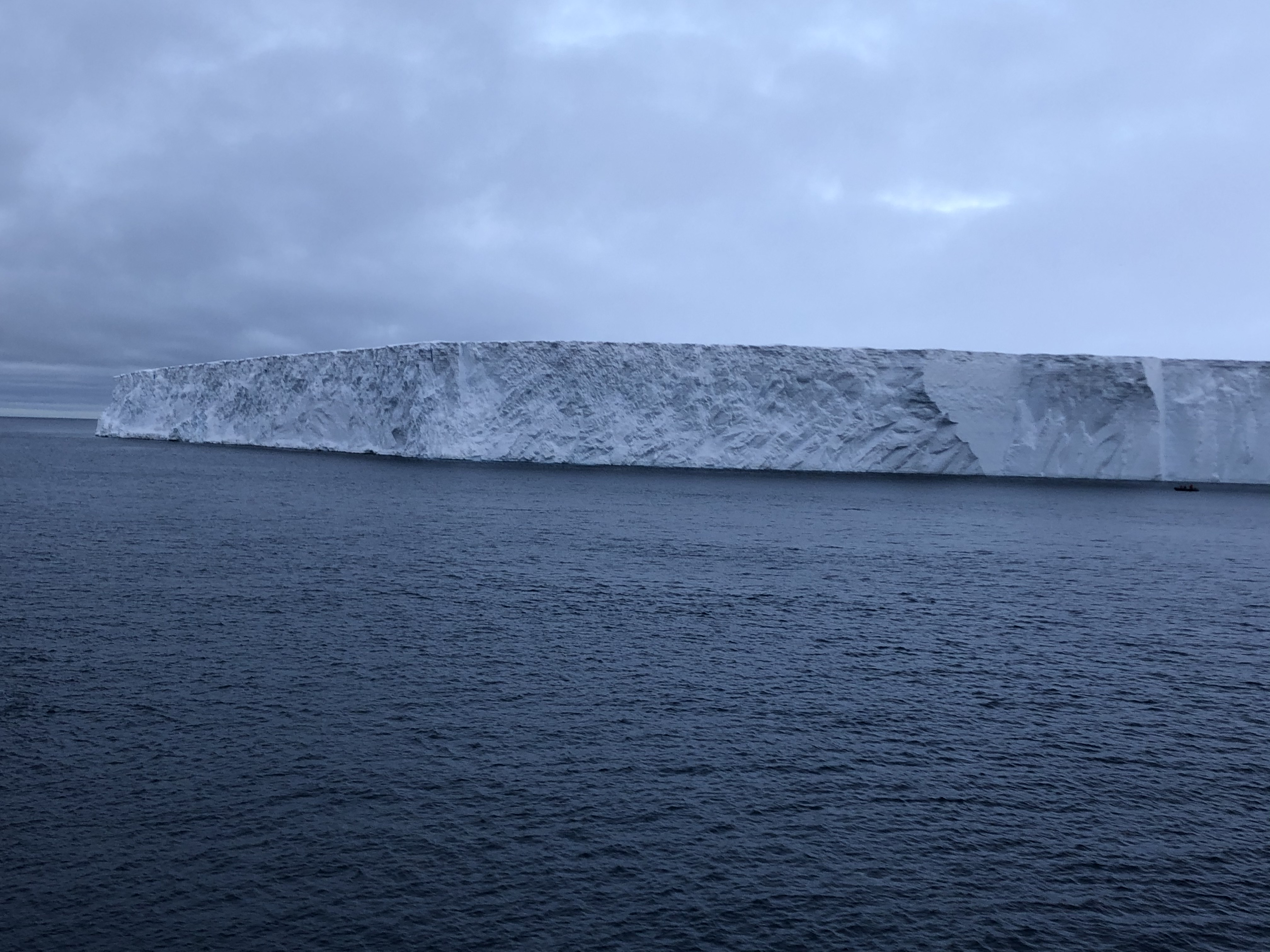
Close-up of A-68 on 9 December 2019

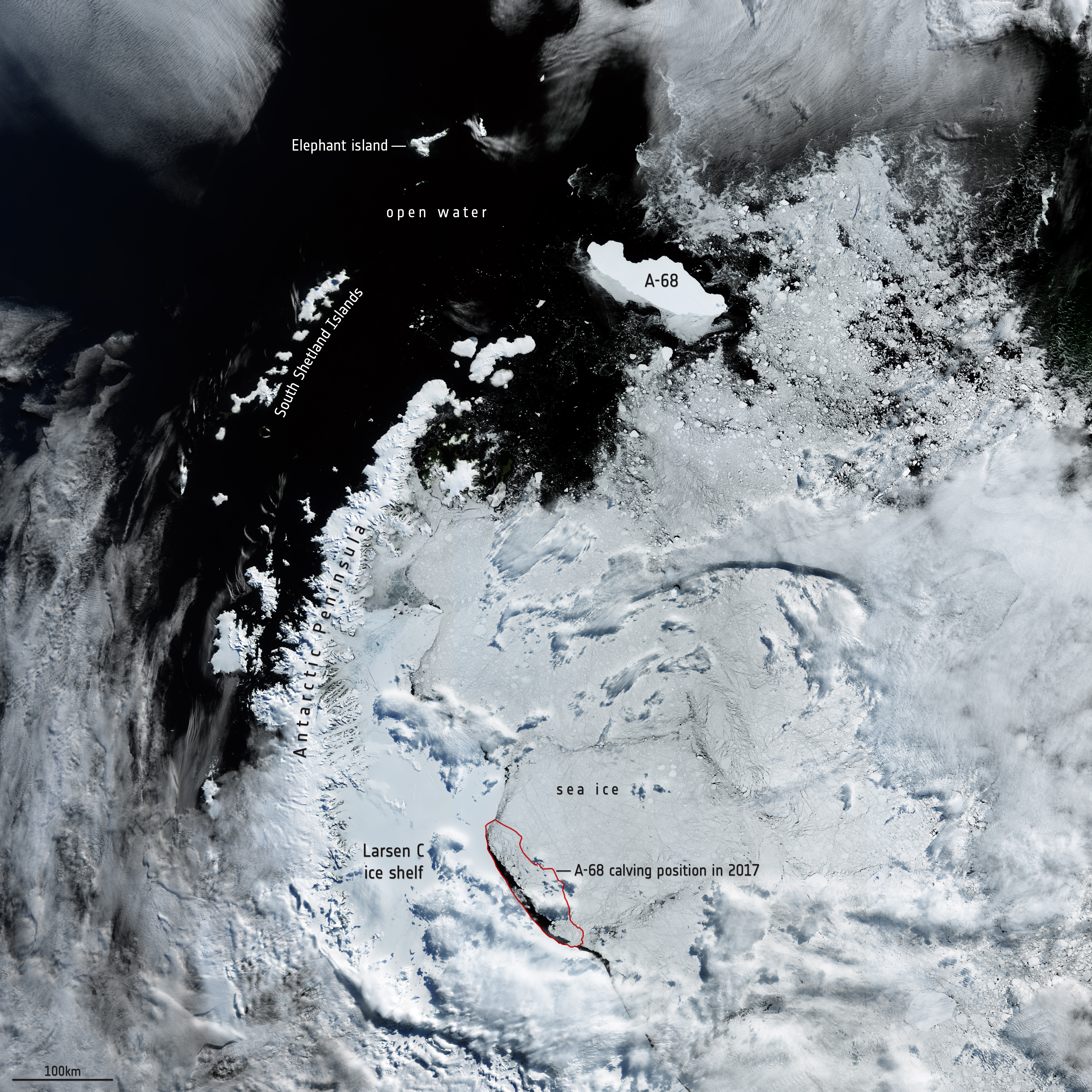
A-68A location on 9 February 2020

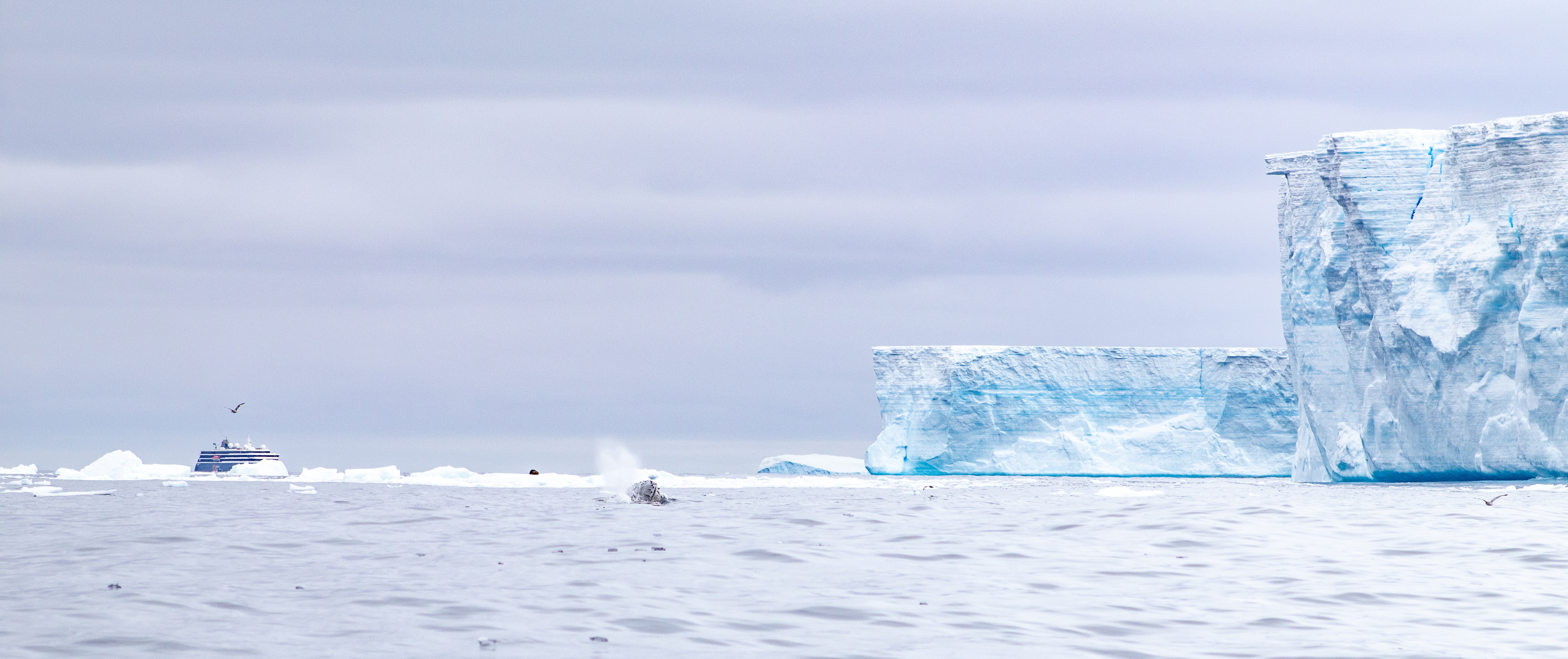
MS World Explorer at A-68A (with spyhopping humpback whale) in the Weddell Sea, 10 March 2020

A-68A in open waters on 5 July 2020
