= Umberto Cagni =

Polar explorer and an admiral in the Royal Italian Navy

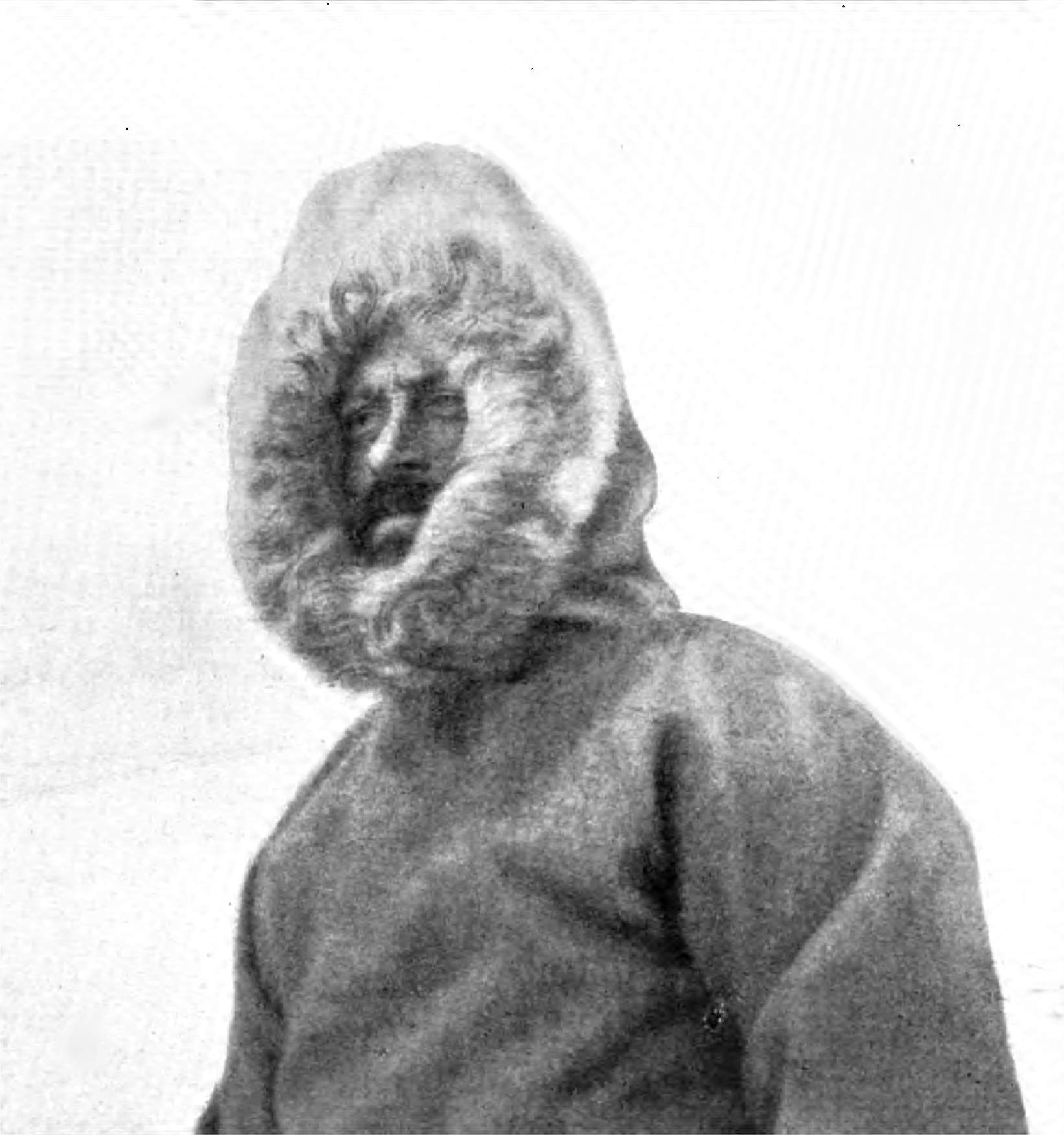
Umberto Cagni

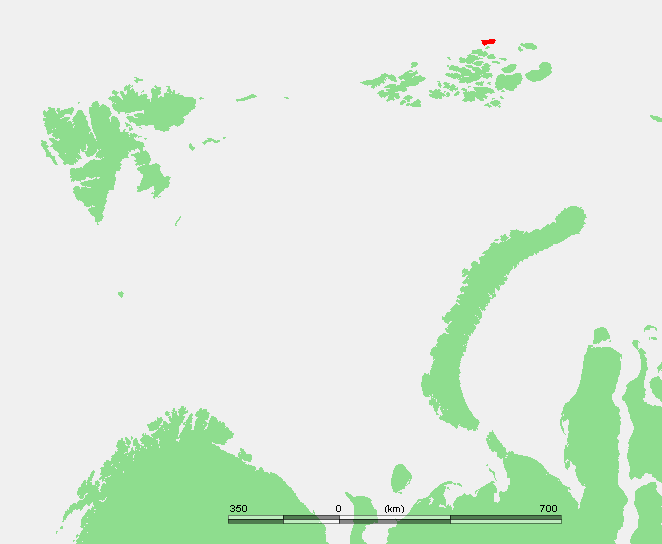
Rudolf Island, shown in red, used as a base for Cagni's expedition

Umberto Cagni (24 February 1863, Asti – 22 April 1932, Genoa) was a polar explorer and an admiral in the Royal Italian Navy. He is best known for his leadership in a probe, by dogsled, northward over the surface of the Arctic Ocean in 1900. While his party failed in their goal of reaching the North Pole, on 25 April 1900, Cagni and his men achieved the northernmost point achieved by exploration up to that time, 86° 34′ N.

== Life and career ==
Cagni was born in the fast-growing Kingdom of Italy, which had been proclaimed only two years earlier during the Risorgimento. His well-placed father, a Piedmontese general, bestowed kinship ties that led to young Cagni being accepted for training by the Italian navy as a future officer. He was commissioned as an ensign in 1881.

Cagni advanced in the service in terms of both rank and connections. By 1899, he was a captain in the Regia Marina and a close associate of Prince Luigi Amedeo. The prince was an Italian duke, nephew of the king of Italy, and an experienced mountaineer. Organizing a group of 20 Italian and Norwegian men led by himself, the royal duke sailed on 12 June 1899 from Christiania for the recently discovered Franz Josef Land, via Archangel'sk. In far northern Russia, Cagni and Luigi Amedeo obtained the sledge dogs that would be a key element of the expedition. On 12 July, they sailed north from Archangel'sk aboard their exploration vessel, the Stella Polare, their goal the establishment of a winter base in Franz Josef Land that would give them a jumping-off place to attain the North Pole.

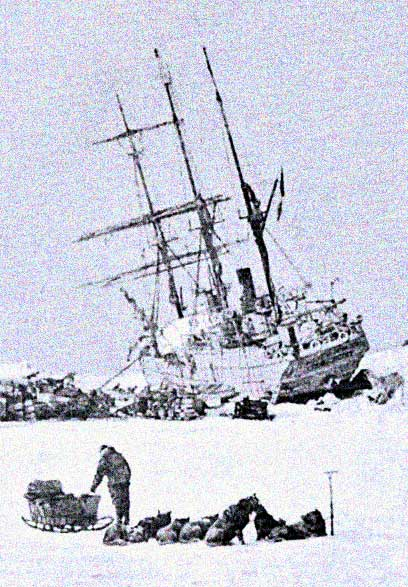
Cagni's expedition ship, the Stella Polare

=== Polar push ===
Although a base was established at Rudolf Island, trouble came during the winter of 1899–1900 when the Stella Polare was partly crushed by polar ice and the expedition's leader, Luigi Amedeo, was badly injured by frostbite. The expedition's physician had to amputate two of the royal duke's fingers, and the maimed commander was pronounced unfit to lead the polar push. Luigi Amedeo deputized command over the lead dogsled party to Cagni, who forged northward from Franz Josef Land on 11 March. The dogs were pulling food and other supplies for three months' march.

After great difficulties, including the deaths of three men from supporting parties, the four men of the Cagni party began to realize that the North Pole was beyond their reach. Their only remaining option was to go as far north as they could, plant a flag, and return with barely enough food to keep them alive on the trek back to their base camp. As it happened, the flag was planted on 25 April at 86°34' N., which was 35 km (20 nautical miles) north of the 86°14' N. mark achieved by Nansen and Johansen in 1895. This was a new "Farthest North".

After this achievement, Cagni and his three companions faced a race for life. Throwing away almost all of their remaining impedimenta and crowding into a single tent, the foursome regained Franz Josef Land on 23 June, twelve days after their projected survival deadline. The explorers returned to Italy in triumph, and Cagni was lionized by leading figures of the day, such as Gabriele D'Annunzio.

=== Later life ===
Following this achievement, Cagni returned to Italian naval service. He led naval relief efforts in the 1908 Messina earthquake, participated in the colonial conquest of Libya in 1911–1912, served in World War I, retired in 1923 as an admiral, and was named to the Italian Senate. He lived for nine years in retirement until his death. He is buried in his native Asti, where his memory is celebrated to this day.

== Legacy ==
In 2005, a 3,500-metre-tall seamount on the floor of the Arctic Ocean was named "Umberto Cagni Seamount" in recognition of Cagni's bravery and leadership in ice exploration.
