= Borchgrevink Nunatak =

Nunatak in Graham Land, Antarctica

Location of Oscar II Coast on Antarctic Peninsula.

Borchgrevink Nunatak (66°3′S 62°30′W) is a nunatak 1.5 nautical miles (3 km) long which rises to 650 metres (2,130 ft), standing at the south side of the entrance to Richthofen Pass, on the east coast of Graham Land. It was discovered in 1902 by the Swedish Antarctic Expedition under Otto Nordenskiöld, who named it for C. E. Borchgrevink, leader of the British Antarctic Expedition, 1898–1900, to Victoria Land.
