= Carl Anton Larsen =

Whaler and Antarctic explorer

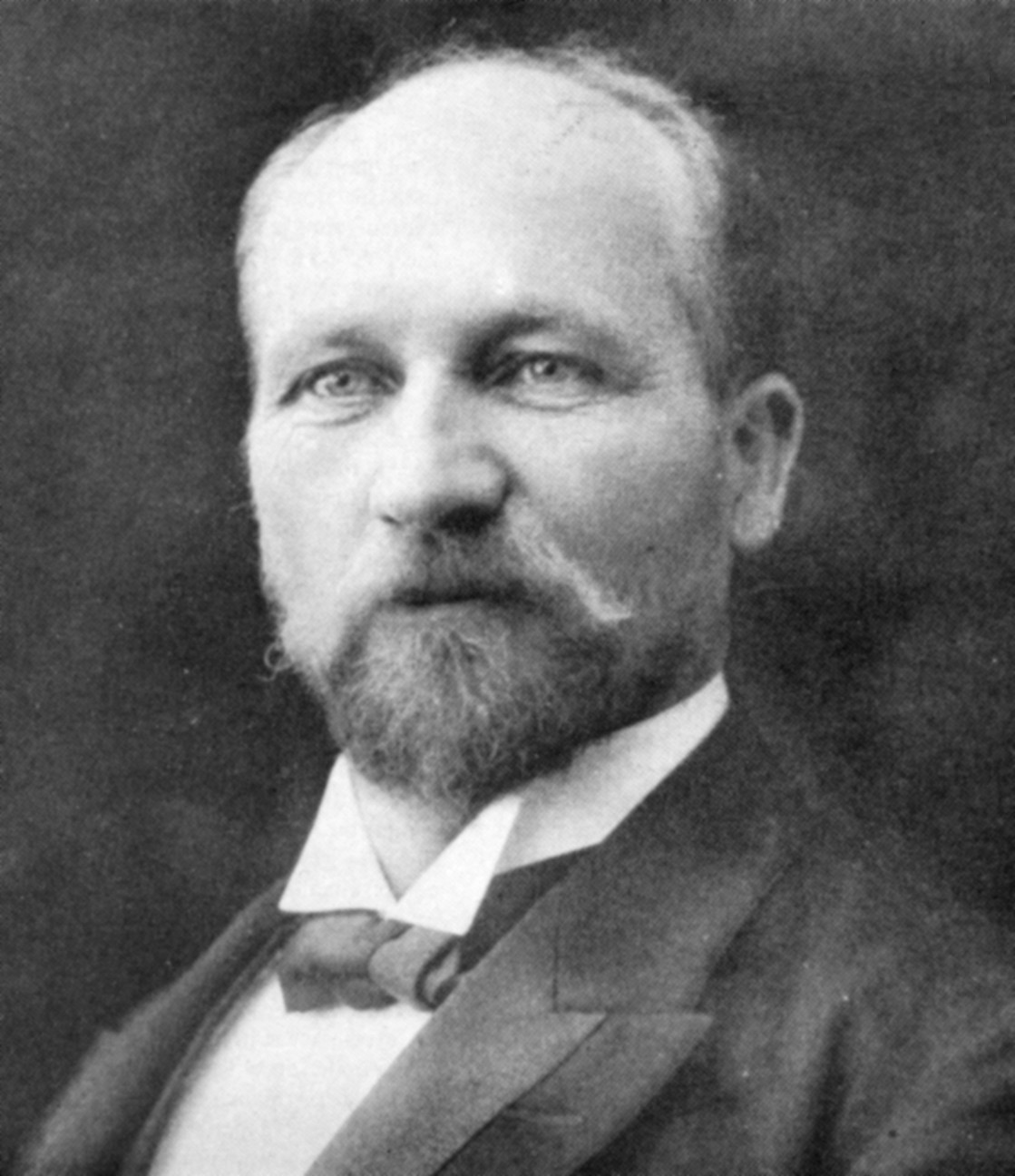
- Carl Anton Larsen
- Born: 7 August 1860; Østre Halsen, Norway
- Died: 8 December 1924 (aged 64); Ross Sea, Antarctica
- Occupations: sailor, ship captain, whaler, and Antarctic explorer
- Spouse(s): Andrine Larsen, née Thorsen
- Parent(s): Ole Christian Larsen and Ellen Andrea Larsen, née Engelbrightsen

Carl Anton Larsen (7 August 1860 – 8 December 1924) was a Norwegian-born whaler and Antarctic explorer who made important contributions to the exploration of Antarctica, the most significant being the first discovery of fossils for which he received the Back Grant from the Royal Geographical Society. In December 1893 he became the first person to ski in Antarctica on the Larsen Ice Shelf which was subsequently named after him. In 1904, Larsen re-founded a whaling settlement at Grytviken on the island of South Georgia. In 1910, after some years' residence on South Georgia, he renounced his Norwegian citizenship and took British citizenship. The Norwegian whale factory ship C.A. Larsen was named after him.

== Early life ==
Carl Anton Larsen was born in Østre Halsen in Tjølling Municipality, the son of Norwegian sea captain Ole Christian Larsen and his wife Ellen Andrea Larsen (née Thorsen). His family subsequently relocated to nearby Sandefjord, the home of the Norwegian whaling industry, where at the young age of 9 he went to sea in a small barque with his father chasing seals and trading across the North Atlantic with Britain, returning to go to school during the fall and winter. He continued this for a number of years, until his curiosity for the sea was so strong he enrolled himself in navigation school where he passed the exam for foreign-going mate at the age of 18. Having been to Britain a few times in the previous years he realized the importance of knowing more languages and taught himself English and Spanish.

Larsen was eager to get work as an officer on a ship, but due to economic difficulties in Norway at the time, he could not achieve that. This was a setback, but he went to work at sea as a cook, learning the importance food played in keeping men happy.

He finally got a position aboard the barque Hoppet out of Larvik, as second mate, then first mate and senior officer below the captain. He was 21 and knew he had to study again so he came ashore and soon became a shipmaster.

Upon becoming a shipmaster, Larsen needed a ship of his own. This was more than he could afford so instead he bought a share of an old barque called the Freden. It was not smooth sailing for Larsen as the barque Freden was all but wrecked after his first voyage. He soon got her fixed, only to be faced with another setback: nobody had any freight he could carry. This turned out to be a stroke of luck as he decided to go on his first whaling experience, hunting bottlenose whales just off the coast of Norway. Larsen was a born whaler and soon filled the Freden with whales and went on filling her until 1885 when he realized that he could not use the Svend Foyn gun with little chaser-steamers like the modern whalers. It was time for a newer ship.

== Expeditions to Antarctica ==
=== Norwegian expedition 1892–1894 ===
Between 1892 and 1894 Larsen led a Norwegian whaling reconnaissance expedition to Antarctica, in command of the Jason. The Jason was a ship Larsen was familiar with as he had been aboard it during the voyage that carried Fridtjof Nansen to Greenland during his east–west crossing in 1888. They spent the 1892–93 summer exploring the waters and shores of Graham Land, returning the following summer to investigate the Weddell and Bellingshausen Seas. The sea ice was particularly light in 1893, allowing the Jason to sail to 68° 10' south, further south than had previously been achieved, and indeed no other traveller would penetrate so far south along the Larsen Ice Shelf for nearly a century.

Larsen added significantly to understanding of the geography of the area, discovering the Larsen Ice Shelf and the Jason Peninsula, two of 12 features named in Larsen's honour, as well as the Foyn Coast in Graham Land, King Oscar Land, and Robertson Island. He also identified two active volcanoes and many groups of islands, and was first to record a colony of emperor penguins although, as the species was unknown to him, he mis-identified them as king penguins. The colony was not rediscovered until 2014. His expedition also discovered fossilised plant remains on Seymour Island, and was the first to return fossils from the region; the site has continued to yield significant paleontological results.

Graham Land and its islands
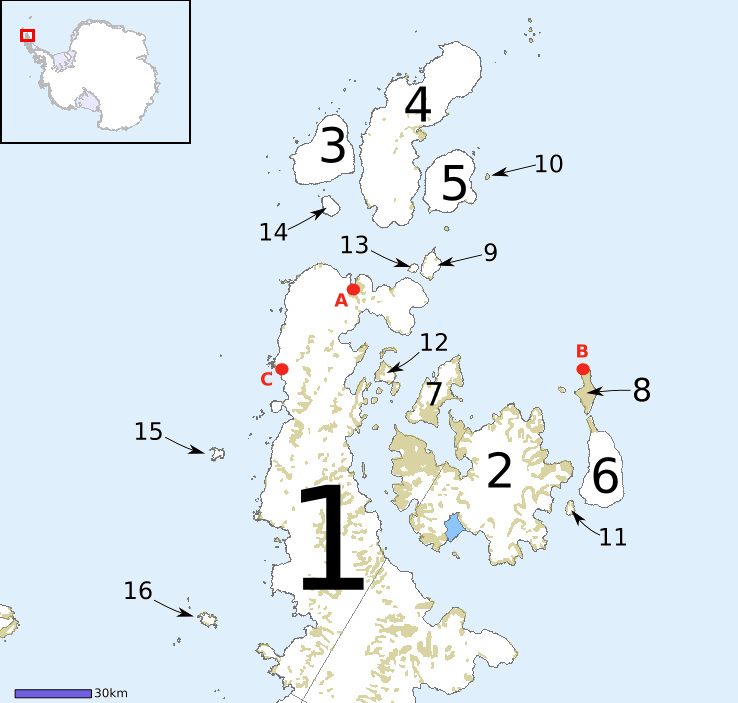
- Map of Graham Land, showing Antarctic Peninsula (1) and Joinville Island (4) with Hope Bay between them, Snow Hill Island (6), Vega Island (7) and Paulet Island (10)

- Location within Antarctica

Geography
- Location: Antarctica
- Coordinates: 63°35′S 55°47′W
- Archipelago: Joinville Island group

=== Swedish expedition 1901–1904 ===
After reading of Larsen's journey, Otto Nordenskjöld contracted him to convey a scientific expedition to the area. Larsen thus captained the ship Antarctic, transporting the Swedish Antarctic Expedition south between 1901 and 1904. The sea ice was heavier than in 1893, and – although the ship passed through the iceberg-infested Antarctic Sound now named after it – the expedition was unable to get further south than Snow Hill Island. Nordenskjöld's party of six scientists was left there in January 1902 to overwinter, and Larsen planned to return the following summer to pick them up.

Larsen spent the southern winter exploring South Georgia, where he found a sheltered harbour, a supply of fresh water, and an abundance of whales. The expedition archaeologist found numerous sealers' artefacts and named the site Grytviken ('Pot Cove'). Larsen saw the possibilities to establish a land-based whaling station, which he was to develop from 1904. Returning south in December 1902 to collect Nordenskjöld's party, Larsen found Antarctic Sound choked with ice. Before attempting the more treacherous route around Joinville Island, Larsen therefore left three men (Duse, Andersson and Grunden) at Hope Bay with instructions to sledge south, contact Nordenskjöld's team, and bring them back to Snow Hill Island in case the Antarctic was unable to reach them. While Larsen headed into the Weddell Sea, the three men found their route blocked by open water and returned to Hope Bay to await Larsen's return.

The pack ice was thick in the Weddell Sea and Larsen, trapped several times, was eventually unable to free his ship. After several weeks, on 12 February 1903, the trapped ship was crushed and sank; the nineteen remaining crew (and the ship's cat) took what they could and crossed the ice to the nearest land, Paulet Island, where they overwintered, surviving (like the team at Hope Bay) on penguins and seals they captured. Nordenskjöld and his team had explored the Larsen ice shelf and Jason Peninsula during the summer; unaware of the fate of the Antarctic but better supplied than the ship's crew, they too settled in for another winter when the Antarctic failed to arrive.

With summer, in late 1903, the three men at Hope Bay decided to make another attempt to reach Nordenskjöld; his location was known to potential rescuers, while theirs was not. Although they veered south-west towards Prince Gustav Channel, by chance Nordenskjöld's team had also decided to explore that area and the two teams met on 12 October 1903 near Vega Island.

Meanwhile Larsen had rowed across Hope Bay from Paulet Island with five men, to rescue the men he had left there. Arriving, they found the deserted hut and a note saying the men had left in another attempt to find Nordenskjöld. Larsen's boat therefore headed south to Snow Hill Island to attempt to find them there. On 8 November the Argentine ship ARA Uruguay reached Snow Hill Island to rescue the two teams now re-united there; miraculously, Larsen and the five men from his boat arrived later in the afternoon, having seen the Uruguay in the distance. The Uruguay then sailed north to collect the remaining crew from Paulet Island. Only one crew member had been lost, succumbing to illness while overwintering on Paulet Island.

== Larsen and South Georgia ==
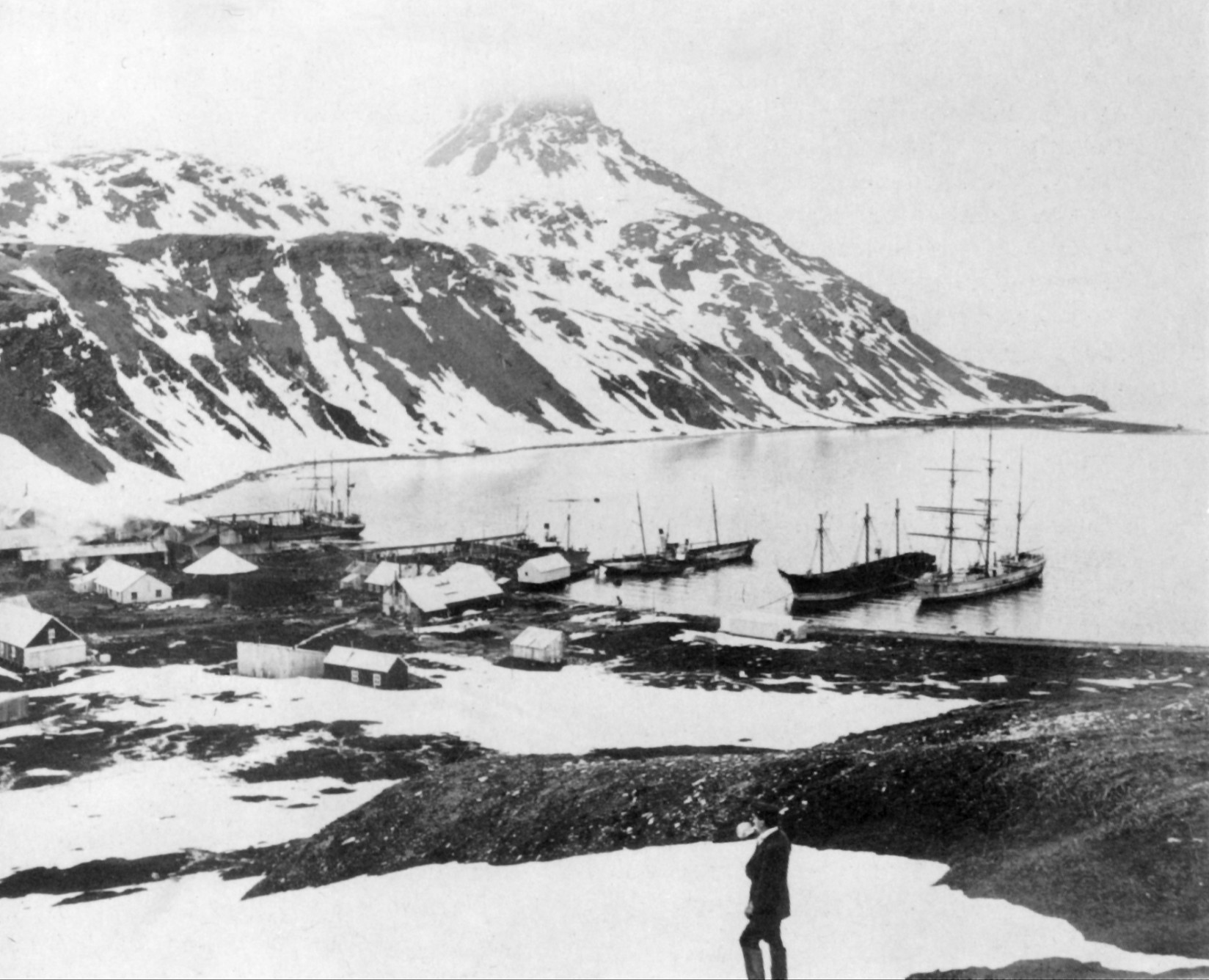
Grytviken in 1914

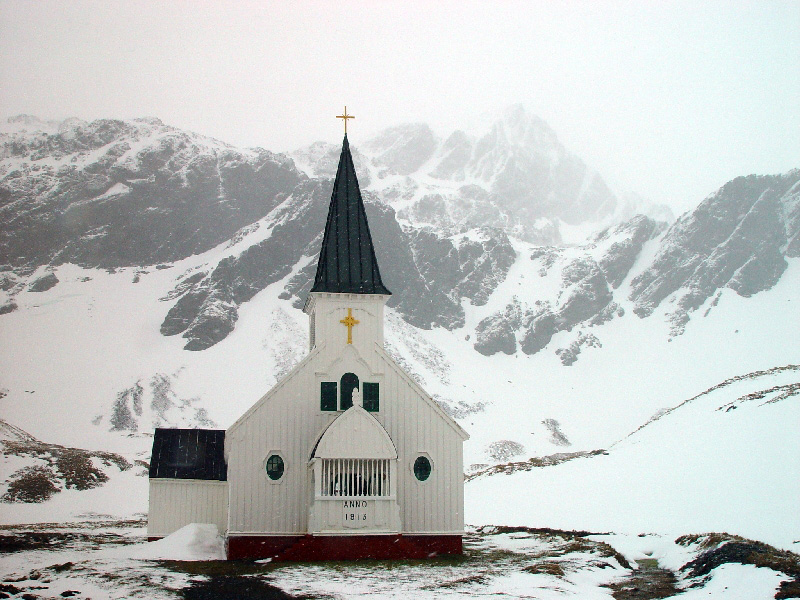
The Norwegian Lutheran Church in Grytviken (built in 1913)

In 1904, Larsen settled on the British island of South Georgia in the Antarctic, starting a new era of whaling. On Christmas Eve, 1904, he produced the first whale oil of the season in the newly built whaling station of Grytviken. With capital from Argentine, Norwegian and British sources, he founded the first Antarctic whaling corporation, the Compañía Argentina de Pesca (Argentine Fishing Company). Within a few years the Antarctic was producing about 70% of the world's whale oil.

Larsen had chosen the whaling station's site during his 1902 visit while in command of the Antarctic. Larsen organized the construction of Grytviken―a remarkable undertaking accomplished by a team of 60 Norwegians. As with other buildings, a church was pre-built in Norway and erected in Grytviken. This typical Norwegian-style church was consecrated as a Church of Norway church, on Christmas Day, 1913. In 1922, the funeral service for Sir Ernest Shackleton was conducted in the church before his burial in the church cemetery. Larsen established a meteorological observatory at Grytviken, which from 1905 was maintained in cooperation with the Argentine Meteorological Office under the British lease requirements of the whaling station until these changed in 1949. Larsen was also instrumental, with his brother, in introducing Reindeer to South Georgia in 1911, as a resource for recreational hunting for the people involved in the whaling industry.

Larsen, like other managers and senior officers of the South Georgia whaling stations, lived in Grytviken together with his family including his wife, three daughters and two sons. In 1910, they obtained British citizenship, following an application filed with the British Magistrate of South Georgia in which Larsen declared: "I have given up my Norwegian citizens rights and have resided here since I started whaling in this colony on 16 November 1904 and have no reason to be of any other citizenship than British, as I have had and intend to have my residence here still for a long time."

Larsen died in December 1925 while attempting to run a full-scale whale factory ship down towards the Ross Sea.

== See also ==
- Larsen Harbour
- Viktor Esbensen
- Carl Julius Evensen
- Bristol Island
- Montagu Island
- Robertson Island
- Seymour Island
- Thule Island
- History of South Georgia and the South Sandwich Islands
