= Dina Larsen =

Norwegian domestic science teacher and civil servant (1873–1961)

Lovise Bernhardine "Dina" Larsen (13 September 1873 – 31 August 1961) was a Norwegian domestic science teacher and civil servant. She managed the Norwegian State College for Domestic Science Teachers from 1909 to 1917 and became the first female assistant secretary (Norwegian: byråsjef) in 1936.

== Biography ==
She was born in Søgne Municipality to shipmaster Tarald Larsen (1844–1915) and Alette Christine Gjertsen (1843–1933). In her youth, she sailed with her father for some time, but also took middle school, worked as a maid in Søgne and finished Bonnevie's Domestic Science School in 1902.

Larsen was hired at Drammen Women's Rights Association Domestic Science School in 1903. From 1906 to 1908 she managed the school. In 1909 the Norwegian State College for Domestic Science Teachers was established at Ringstabekk, and Larsen was appointed as manager of this college. During her time theoretical subjects such as psychology and pedagogy were introduced at the school. She remained manager until 1917, and then she served as state inspector of all domestic science colleges in Norway from 1917 to 1935. She is regarded as central in the "second wave" of domestic science pioneers in Norway, after the first wave of Dorothea Christensen, Helga Helgesen and Henriette Schønberg Erken.

In 1936, Larsen was promoted further to assistant secretary in the Ministry of Agriculture, leading an office of domestic science. She retired in 1938.

Larsen was also a co-founder of the Norwegian Association of Domestic Science Teachers in 1914. In 1932, she issued the cookbook Norsk mat. Uppskrifter på nasjonale rettar frå eldre og nyare tid with D. Rabbe. In 1938, she followed with Gøyming og konservering av matvarer.

She did not marry. She died in August 1961 in Oslo.

== Awards and honours ==
She was awarded the King's Medal of Merit in gold.
