= Hassa Horn =

Hassa Horn may refer to:

- Hassa Horn, Sr. (1837–1921), Norwegian civil servant, father of the latter
- Hassa Horn, Jr. (1873–1968), Norwegian road engineer, industrialist, sports official and politician
