= Germeten =

Germeten is a Norwegian surname. Notable people with the surname include:

- Else Germeten (1918–1992), Norwegian women's group executive and film censor;
- Gunnar Germeten (1918–1995), Norwegian civil servant.
