= Sørreisa Church =

Sørreisa Church Tømmervik Church
- Sørreisa kirke Tømmervik kirke
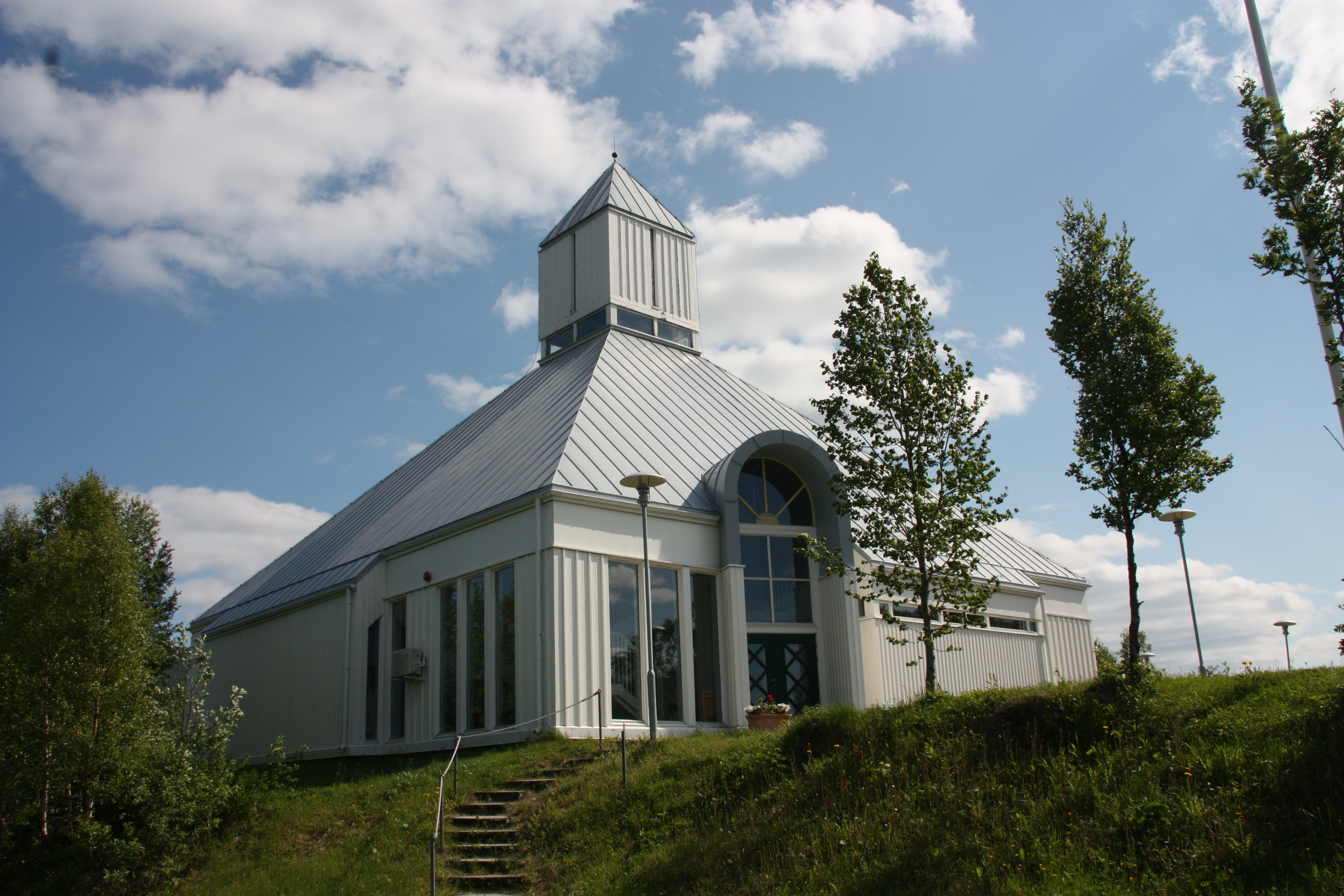
- View of the church
- Sørreisa Church; Tømmervik Church
- 69.175247°N 18.085990°E
- Location: Sørreisa Municipality, Troms
- Country: Norway
- Denomination: Church of Norway
- Churchmanship: Evangelical Lutheran

History
- Status: Parish church
- Founded: 1844
- Consecrated: 1992

Architecture
- Functional status: Active
- Architect: Viggo Ditlefsen
- Architectural type: Square
- Completed: 1992 (34 years ago)

Specifications
- Capacity: 300
- Materials: Steel and wood

Administration
- Diocese: Nord-Hålogaland
- Deanery: Senja prosti
- Parish: Sørreisa
- Norwegian Cultural Heritage Site
- Type: Church
- Status: Not protected
- ID: 85057

Sørreisa Church or Tømmervik Church (Norwegian: Sørreisa kirke / Tømmervik kirke) is a parish church of the Church of Norway in Sørreisa Municipality in Troms county, Norway. It is located about 5 kilometres (3.1 mi) northwest of the village of Sørreisa at Tømmervika, near the shore of the Reisafjorden. It is one of the churches for the Sørreisa parish which is part of the Senja prosti (deanery) in the Diocese of Nord-Hålogaland. The white, wood and steel church was built in a square-shaped design in 1992 using plans drawn up by the architect Viggo Ditlefsen. The church seats about 300 people.

== History ==
The original church in Sørreisa was built on this site in 1844. The church building was octagonal and it was designed by the architect Christian H. Grosch. That church building burned down in 1987 and a new church was built on the same site in 1992. The new church is a square-shaped church that is larger than the old church. The interior of the new church has an octagonal-shaped sanctuary in the center of the square building that corresponds the outline of the old church. Surrounding the sanctuary are overflow rooms, a sacristy, and bathrooms.

== Media gallery ==
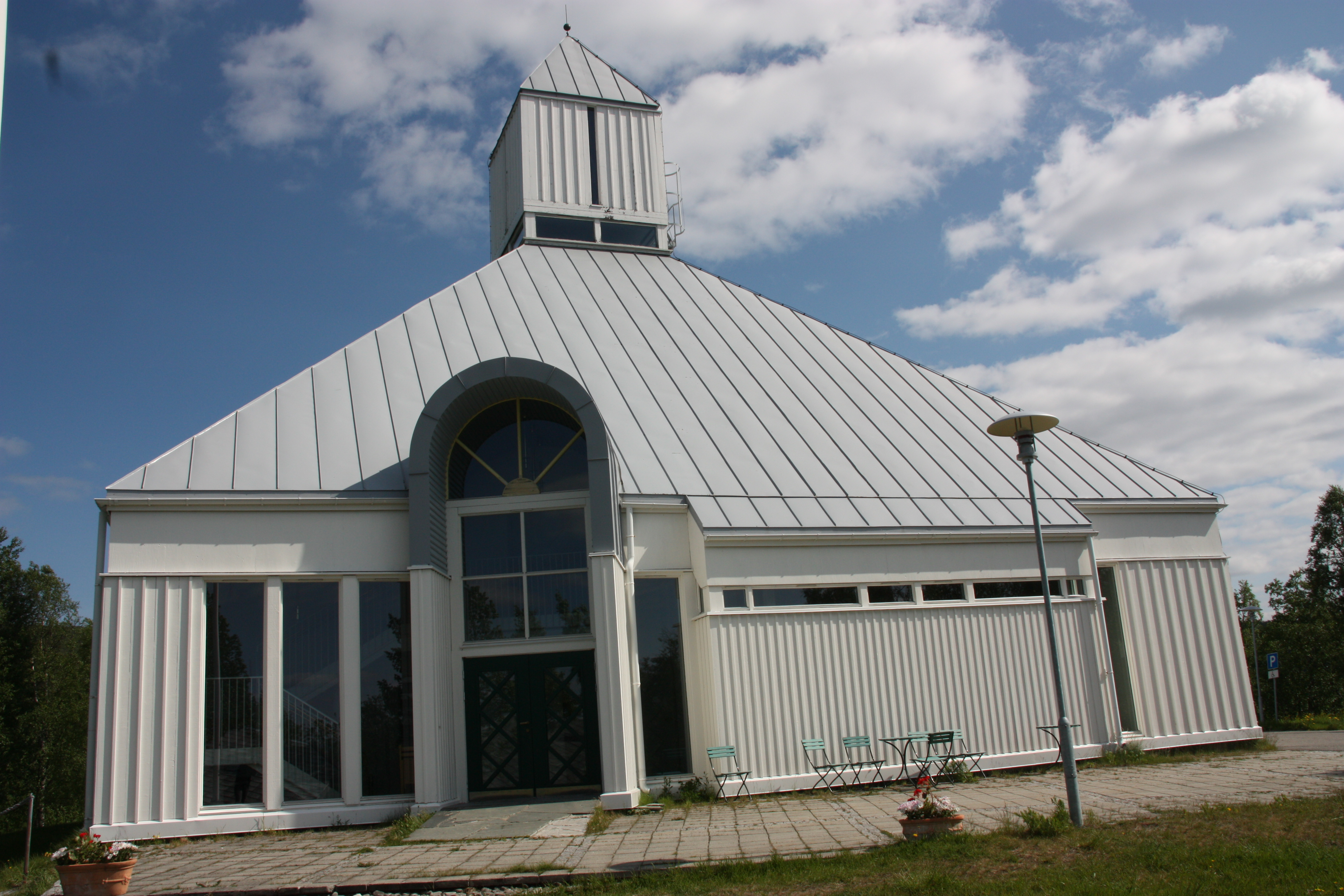

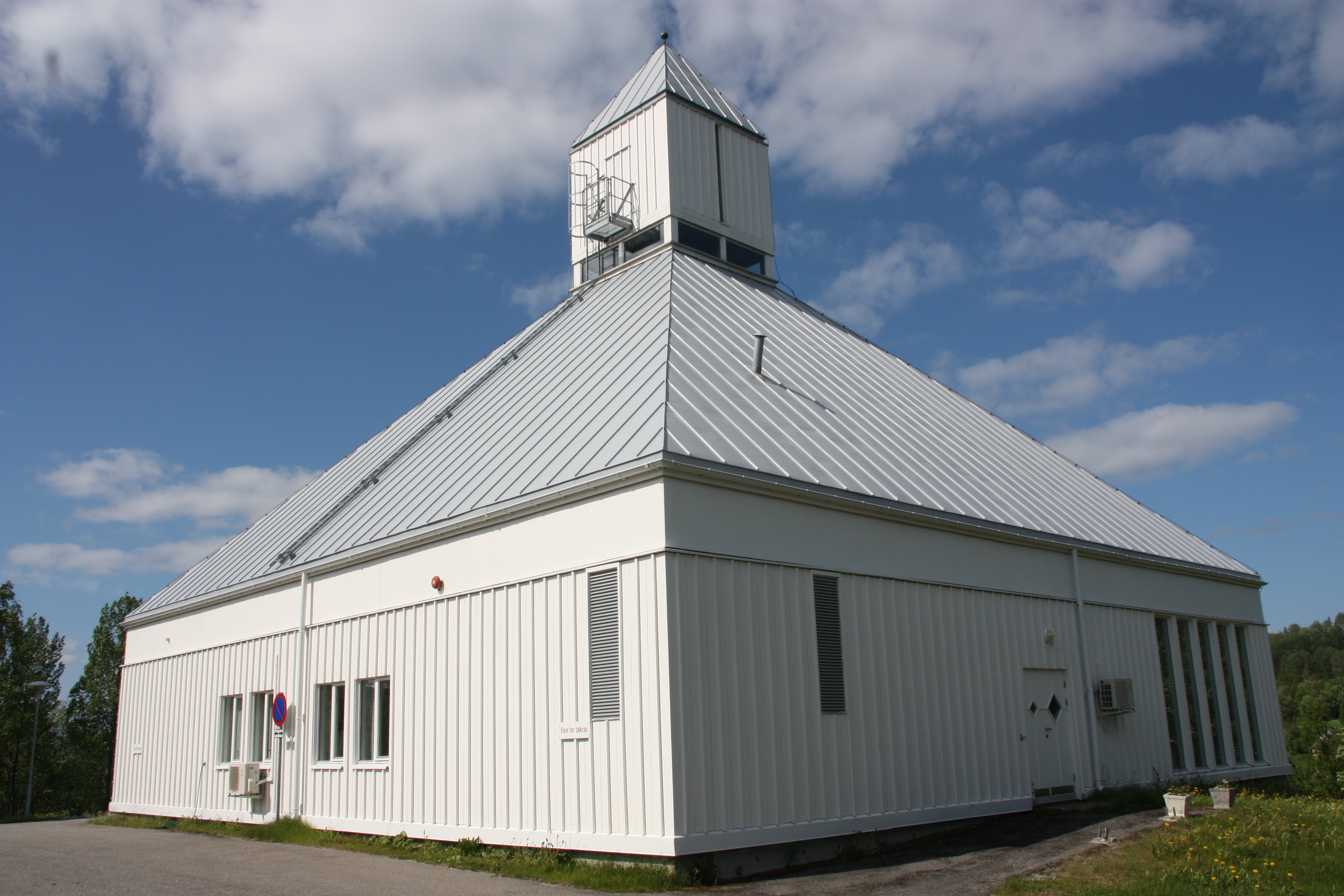

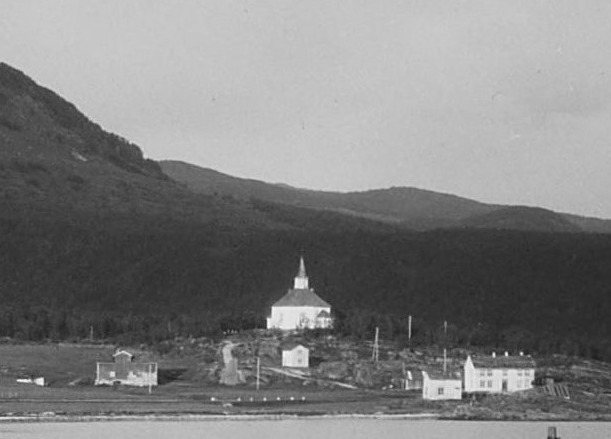
View of the original church (1844-1987)

== See also ==
- List of churches in Nord-Hålogaland
