= Helga Helgesen =

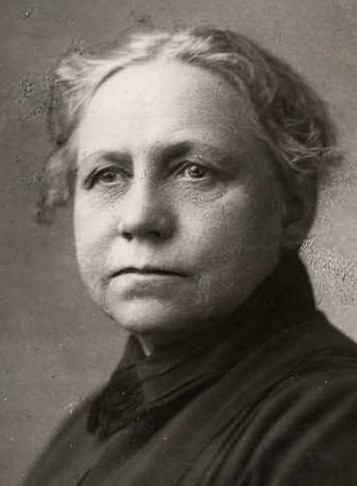
Helga Helgesen c.1925.

Helga Bernhardine Helgesen (16 March 1863 – 30 March 1936) was a Norwegian domestic science teacher and politician for the Liberal Party.

== Early life and education ==
She was born in Hønefoss as a daughter of Ole Helgesen (1827–1910) and Anne Mathea Alme (1824–89). Her father was a merchant in Hønefoss city as well as a paternalistic industrialist. She spent her youth both in the city, and at the nearby farm Alme in Norderhov which belonged to the maternal branch of the family.

Helgesen finished middle school at Nissen Girls School in 1880. She was a governess for four years before taking a teachers' education in 1885.

== Career ==
She was hired as a primary school teacher at Tøyen in 1885, then at Kampen in 1886.

Helgesen was a member of Norwegian Association for Women's Rights and Hjemmenes Vel (from 1934: the Norwegian Housewives' Association). Both these organizations were proponents of a better education in the domestic sciences. Helgesen became personally engaged in such issues, especially while working and living at Kampen. She started a voluntary school kitchen education at Kampen School for both boys and girls, and studied German literature on domestic science (Marie Clima's 1889 book Haushaltungskunde) and also travelled to Germany. In 1890 she studied in Scotland on a scholarship.

Together with Dorothea Christensen and Henriette Schønberg Erken, Helgesen has been credited with forming the "first wave" of domestic science pioneers in Norway. In 1893 Helgesen and Christensen issued the cookbook Kogebog for folkeskolen og hjemmet. In 1898 she was hired as school kitchen inspector in Kristiania, a position she held until 1904. In 1908 school kitchens became mandatory for Norwegian schools.

At the same time, the Norwegian State College for Domestic Science Teachers was established at Ringstabekk (in 1909). Helgesen was active in the groundwork at the new college. In 1910, 1912 and 1915 she was the state inspector for the domestic sciences, and from 1917 to her retirement in 1925 she was the state inspector of school kitchens. A new book with Dorothea Christensen followed in 1911, Husstel for fortsættelsesskoler, realskoler, ungdomsskoler, lærerskoler og skolekjøkkenkurser for voksne. From 1923 to 1925 she served as a member of Kristiania city council.

== Awards and honours ==
She received the King Oscar II Gold Medal in 1897.

== Personal life and legacy ==
She did not marry. She died in March 1936 in Oslo. A statue of her has been erected at Kampen School, and a square (formerly a street) in Oslo has been named after her.
