= Else Germeten =

Norwegian politician (1918–1992)

Else Germeten, née Knutson (8 August 1918 – 11 September 1992) was a Norwegian women's group executive and film censor and a member of the Labour Party.

She was born in Kristiania as a daughter of bookkeeper Martinius Knutson (1879–1955) and Dea Reinertsen (1882–1949). In 1941, she married civil servant Gunnar Germeten. They resided at Nordstrandshøgda, and had one daughter and two sons. Their daughter, Kjersti, was an actress and married scenographer Christian Egemar.

She finished her secondary education at Oslo Cathedral School in 1937. She studied English and literature in Norway, graduating in 1941, and took courses in psychology in the United States in 1953. Furthermore, she became a working committee member in the Norwegian Housewives' Association (from 1997: the Norwegian Women and Family Association) in 1954, and was the leader of the organization from 1959 to 1969. Among her early work was trials with film-based tuition in schools. In 1970, she started working at the National Film Censorship, where she was director from 1978 to 1987. Her husband was also involved in the film industry, as the chair of National Association of Municipal Cinematographers.

She sat on the Norwegian Nobel Committee from 1979 to 1984. Her engagement in international affairs also included a national board membership in the Foreningen Norden. In Norwegian politics, she was also a member of the School Committee of 1965, the Alcoholic Beverages Law Commission, and the Road Planning Committee of 1972. She died in September 1992 and was buried at Nordstrand.

Preceded by Alette Engelhart	Chair of the Norwegian Housewives' Association; 1959–1969	Succeeded by
