= Jørgen Hansen =

Jørgen Hansen may refer to:

- Jørgen Hansen (footballer) (born 1931), Danish footballer; silver medalist at the 1960 Summer Olympics
- Jørgen Hansen (skier), Norwegian skier
- Jørgen Hansen (cyclist) (born 1942), Danish cyclist
- Svend Jørgen Hansen (born 1922), Danish footballer; played two games for the Danish national team
- Jørgen W. Hansen (born 1925), Danish footballer; competed at the 1948 (bronze medalist) and 1952 Summer Olympics
- Jens Jørgen Hansen (born 1939), Danish footballer; competed at the 1964 European Championship
- Jørgen Hansen (rower) (1890–1953), Danish rower
- Jørgen Hansen (boxer) (1943–2018), Danish boxer
- Jørgen Hammergaard Hansen (1930s–2013), Danish badminton player
- Jørgen Robert Hansen (1911–1991), Danish field hockey player
- Jørgen Peder Hansen (1923–1994), Danish politician and minister
