= Straumen Chapel =

- Straumen kapell
- Straumen Chapel
- 69.1413943°N 18.147570°E
- Location: Sørreisa Municipality, Troms
- Country: Norway
- Denomination: Church of Norway
- Churchmanship: Evangelical Lutheran

History
- Status: Parish church
- Founded: 1973
- Consecrated: 1973

Architecture
- Functional status: Active
- Architect: Elisabeth Breen Fidjestøl
- Architectural type: Rectangular
- Completed: 1973 (53 years ago)

Specifications
- Capacity: 170
- Materials: Brick

Administration
- Diocese: Nord-Hålogaland
- Deanery: Senja prosti
- Parish: Sørreisa
- Norwegian Cultural Heritage Site
- Type: Church
- Status: Not protected
- ID: 85602

Straumen Chapel (Norwegian: Straumen kapell) is a parish church of the Church of Norway in Sørreisa Municipality in Troms county, Norway. It is located in the village of Sørreisa. It is one of the churches for the Sørreisa parish which is part of the Senja prosti (deanery) in the Diocese of Nord-Hålogaland. The white, brick church was built in a rectangular design in 1973 using plans drawn up by the architect Elisabeth Breen Fidjestøl. The church seats about 170 people.

There is a free standing bell tower to the east of the main entrance. The church includes a parish hall, offices, and lounge area that includes two ping pong tables. In 2014, the church was renovated and a new chancel was added to enlarge the sanctuary.

== See also ==
- List of churches in Nord-Hålogaland
