= Christen Christensen (shipowner) =

Norwegian shipyard and ship owner

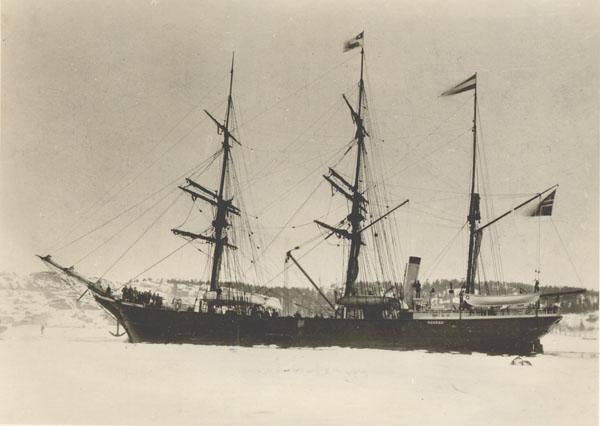
1881 Bark JASON Sail ship w/auxiliary engine, bark, sealer, wooden hull. Flag: Norway, Port: Sandefjord, Year built: 1881, Yard: Rødsverven (A/S Framnæs mek. Værksted), Sandefjord Owner: Christen Christensen, Sandefjord

Christen Christensen (9 September 1845 – 16 November 1923) was a Norwegian shipyard and ship-owner. He was the founder and chairman of the world's largest whaling company, A/S Oceana.

== Early life ==
Christen Christensen was born in Sandefjord, as a son of ship-owner Søren Lorentz Christensen (1810–1862) and his wife Othilie Juliane (née Kruge) (1820–1903). He was a brother of military officer Sophus Christensen, and doctor and politician Julius Christensen.

He was sent to boarding school in Scotland and then at 17 went on to study at the Trade Academy in Copenhagen.

== Career ==
In 1868 Christensen took over as manager of Rødsverven from his widowed mother, who had run the company for a number of years after her husband's early death in 1862. The first ship he built was the schooner Freddrike in 1869.

In the summer of 1872, Christen Christensen, shopkeeper P.C. Pedersen, shopkeeper G. Wierød and Christen Lorentz Sørensen, built a steam sawmill at Svines by lake Goksjø, named Gogsjø Dampsag. When a shareholder in Rødsverven died in April 1878. Christensen became the sole owner of the shipyard, and with it, what many consider the beginning of modern industrial shipbuilding in Sandefjord. The shipyard provided year-round jobs, a sharp contrast to previously, where work was typically seasonal.

In 1892 he bought Sandefjord Mekaniske Verksted, merging it with his other ship yards to form Framnæs Mekaniske Værksted. The shipbuilding engineer Ole Wegger became its director and remained in that position for 47 years. Christensen then entered the whaling business as owner of the company Shields & Værge, which ran most of the fishing in Finnmark. The company was bought at auction for a small price, undoubtedly because of the decline in the North Atlantic whaling stocks, which led to much of the whaling industry going bankrupt. Christensen, however, saw this as an opportunity, having remembered a pamphlet published in 1874 titled, Report on the new whaling grounds of the southern seas by Daniel and Jon Gray. Giving him the idea to send an expedition to Antarctica, in search of new sealing and whaling grounds. Something he would become well known for along with a young Carl Anton Larsen who was an officer aboard the barque Freden, one of Christensen's ships.

On 3 September 1892, the barque Jason left Sandefjord with Captain Carl Anton Larsen on the first Norwegian expedition to Antarctica. During the expedition Larsen discovered Robertson Island and was curious to find out if the volcano on the island was active, so he skied to the top and on his return named it Mt. Christensen after his friend and expedition partner.

In 1894 he established Sandefjord Flytedokker A/S (Sandefjord Dry Docks), two wooden floating docks. A few years later, on 23 February 1887, he would go on to found what would become the world's largest whaling company of the early twentieth century, A/S Oceana of Sandefjord, with businessman and partial shareholder Carl Lindenberg, for the company Woltereck & Robertson in Hamburg. The company bought and processed seal and whale oil from Christensen vessels. A/S Oceana's original share capital was $94,000 NOK and the company was formed for the operation of the 5 whaling vessels the Polar Star, Cito, Franklin, Penda and Aries which Christensen had bought for $73,000 NOK the year before from a bankrupt company in Larvik. The first year of operation was favorable with a surplus of U.S. $66,716 NOK.

On 21 January 1895 Christensen was knighted by King Oscar II of Norway, as a Knight, First Class of the Order of St. Olav. The newly knighted Christensen then went on to install Sandefjord's first electrical lights in his private residence, much to the delight of his friends and neighbors. Not forgetting his shipyard, he installed forty lights in the workshop and twenty at the floating docks. His brother Julius served as mayor at the time.

He then founded the company A/S Ørnen in 1903 for whaling in Finnmark, Bear Island and Spitsbergen. Until then whales were brought ashore for processing but that would all change when he created the world's first floating factory for the processing of whales. This would be the greatest invention in whaling history but one that would have a great impact on whale populations which would be taken in ever greater numbers. He purchased the Admiralen in Oct 1904 for £3,750 and converted it to a floating factory ship by his shipyard Framnæs Mekaniske Værksted, in Sandefjord and equipped it with 8 new open boilers. It first saw service in the Greenland Sea off the coast of Spitsbergen for the 1904–05 season. Due to the large number of whaling vessels around Spitsbergen the season before, Christensen decided to send her to the Antarctic for 1905–06. She left Sandefjord on 21 October 1905 on her first trip to Antarctica as a factory ship, accompanied by her three catchers Hauken, Ørnen and Alex. She arrived in Port Stanley on 13 December 1905.

Christensen was upgraded to Commander, Second Class of the Order of St. Olav in 1911. His son Lars Christensen started his own whaling company in 1907 and would, later in life, become an industry leader in his own right. Another of his sons, Søren Lorentz Christensen, took over as manager of the Eagle in 1912.

== See also ==
- Sandefjord Museum
- Magnus Andersen

== Sources ==
- Basberg, Bjørn L; Jan Erik Ringstad; Einar Wexelsen (1993). Whaling & history, perspectives on the evolution of the industry. Publikasjon (Kommandør Chr. Christensens hvalfangstmuseum); nr. 29. Sandefjord, Norway: Sandefjordmuseene. ISBN 82-990595-6-9.
- Mills, William James (2003). Exploring Polar Frontiers A Historical Encyclopedia. London: ABC-CLIO Publishing. ISBN 1-57607-422-6.
- Riffenburgh, Beau (October 2006). Encyclopedia of the Antarctic, Vol. 1. Taylor & Francis, Inc. p. 584. ISBN 978-0-415-97024-2.
- Yelverton, David E. (2004). Quest for a phantom strait : the saga of the pioneer Antarctic Peninsula expeditions, 1897-1905. New York: Guildford. pp. Intro XII. ISBN 0-9548003-0-3.
- "Dugnadsarbeid for verftshistorien". Hvalfangstmuseet. Archived from the original on 24 July 2011.
- "Christensen Bio". lardex.net. Archived from the original on 19 November 2008.
