= Skøelv Chapel =

- Skøelv kapell
- Skøelv Chapel
- 69.130004°N 18.052747°E
- Location: Sørreisa Municipality, Troms
- Country: Norway
- Denomination: Church of Norway
- Churchmanship: Evangelical Lutheran

History
- Status: Parish church
- Founded: 1966
- Consecrated: 1966

Architecture
- Functional status: Active
- Architect: Petter Bratli
- Architectural type: Long church
- Completed: 1966 (60 years ago)

Specifications
- Capacity: 150
- Materials: Wood

Administration
- Diocese: Nord-Hålogaland
- Deanery: Senja prosti
- Parish: Sørreisa

Skøelv Chapel (Norwegian: Skøelv kapell) is a chapel of the Church of Norway in Sørreisa Municipality in Troms county, Norway. It is located in the village of Skøelva. It is an annex chapel for the Sørreisa parish which is part of the Senja prosti (deanery) in the Diocese of Nord-Hålogaland. The white, wooden chapel was built in a long church style in 1966 using plans drawn up by the architect Petter Bratli. The chapel seats about 150 people.

== See also ==
- List of churches in Nord-Hålogaland
