= Knut M. Ore =

Norwegian businessman

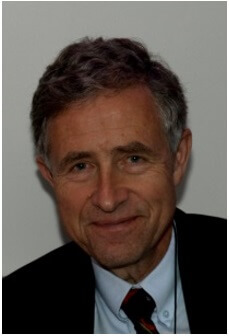
A portrait of Knut Magne Ore

Knut Magne Ore (born 1946) is a Norwegian business executive and Honorary Consul of Slovenia.

He holds a siv.øk. degree at the Norwegian School of Economics and Business Administration in 1970, a Master of Business Administration degree at the University of California, Berkeley in 1971 and a degree in Tax Law at the University of Oslo in 1978. He spent most of his career in Deloitte & Touche, where he was an international partner from 1985 to 2002. In 2002 he became owner and CEO of the company Universal Presentkort, Oslo.

In 2016 he was appointed Honorary Consul for the Republic of Slovenia.

He was chairman of the Board of Directors of the DNT from 1986 to 1994. Knut M. Ore was appointed Honorary Member of DNT Oslo og Omegn in 2008. In 2018 he was appointed Honorary Member of the nationwide DNT, which is a rare mark of honour.

He served as chairman of the board of the Norwegian Glacier Museum from 1994 to 2002, and has been board member of Statskog from 1995 to 2001 and the Norwegian Museum of Cultural History. He is a member of the Board of the Friends of Akershus Castle, Oslo and also of the board of the governmental "Foundation for Art and Culture at Akershus Castle".

From 2002, to 2013 he was chairman of the board of Kings Bay AS and AS Bjørnøen. He was the founder of the Ny-Ålesund Symposium at Svalbard in 2005 and served as Chairman of the Board of this international climate conference until 2014. He is Honorary Citizen of Ny-Ålesund.

He has been President of Gimle Rotary Club, Oslo

He has served on the board of the Olav Thon Foundation since 1991 and of FH-Norge since 2005. In 2011, he was elected Chairman of the Board of Drammen Municipal Pension Fund DKP

He is the President of Skiklubben Skuld, Oslo, which is one of the oldest ski clubs in the world.

He was chairman for the project that the Norwegian Trekking Association did on behalf of the Norwegian Ministry of Foreign Affairs from 2004 to 2012 to assist in developing eco-friendly tourism in the Republic of Kyrgyzstan. He was heavily involved in the establishing of Trekking Union of Kyrgyzstan (TUK).

He has been a lecturer at numerous courses in environmental matters, financial reporting and control and written a large number of articles on these topics.
