= Dorothea Christensen =

Norwegian domestic science proponent and politician (1847–1908)

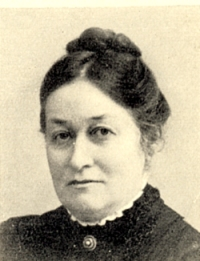

Dorothea von der Lippe Christensen, née Frost (19 December 1847 – 28 February 1908) was a Norwegian domestic science proponent and politician.

== Early and personal life ==
She was born in Veøy Municipality as a daughter of vicar Christian Frost (1810–1862) and Jensine Henriette Brodtkorb (1811–1851). She became an orphan at the age of 15, and moved to attend school in Kristiania.

Helgesen finished governess school at Nissen Girls School, and also attended Eckersberg School of Painting. She worked as a governess for an attorney in Grue Municipality. In September 1871 she married physician and politician Julius Christensen (1840–1923), and moved to his hometown Sandefjord. She then became a sister-in-law of military officer Sophus Christensen, and Julius and she were parents of physician Reidar Gording and grandparents of Elisabeth Gording.

== Career ==
As a housewife, Christensen embarked on organizational work to improve the conditions of her group, partially influenced by travels abroad. In 1890, through a fundraiser, she established Norway's first school kitchen at Sandefjord Primary School. In the same year, a proposition to establish such kitchens in Kristiania had been rejected. The textbook Christensen wrote for the course, Kogebog for folkeskolen og hjemmet, was the first school cookbook in the country. In 1894, it was reissued, now with Helga Helgesen as co-writer. Together with Henriette Schønberg Erken, Helgesen and Christensen have been credited with forming the "first wave" of domestic science pioneers in Norway.

Christensen also established a public library, weavery house, handicraft house, shoemaker courses and a conversation club. She was a writer in local and national newspapers such as Morgenbladet. In 1897, she proposed that Norwegian housewives organize, in the article "Vi husmødre slutter os sammen" in the magazine Husmoderen. The article spurred the 1898 foundation of Kristiania Hjemmenes Vel, which grew to a national organization in 1915 (from 1934: the Norwegian Housewives' Association).

In 1907, she was elected as a member of the municipal council of Sandefjord Municipality. In 1908, she became a member of the committee that inquired into the foundation of a national domestic science college. She died in February 1908 in Sandefjord. She did not live to see the establishment of the Norwegian State College for Domestic Science Teachers, at Ringstabekk in 1909.
