= Sørreisa Municipality =

Municipality in Troms, Norway

Sørreisa Municipality Sørreisa kommune Ráisavuona suohkan (Northern Sami)
- Municipality
- Sørreisen herred (historic name)
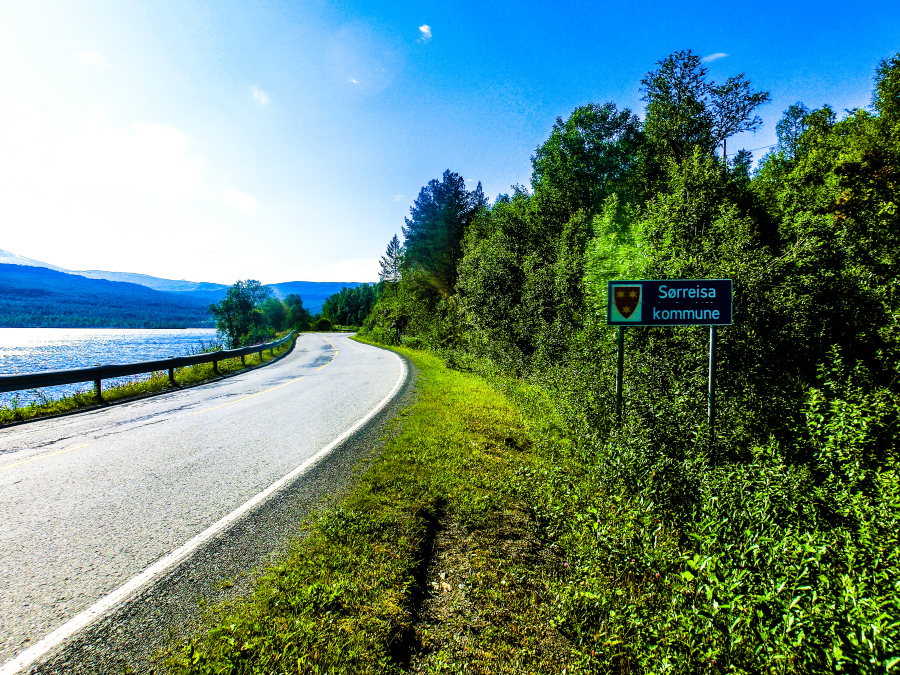

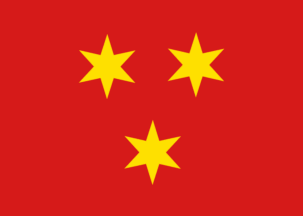
- Flag Coat of arms

- Troms within Norway

- Sørreisa within Troms
- Coordinates: 69°05′31″N 18°11′37″E
- Country: Norway
- County: Troms
- District: Midt-Troms
- Established: 1 Sept 1886
  - Preceded by: Tranøy Municipality
- Administrative centre: Sørreisa

Government
  - Mayor (2015): Jan-Eirik Nordahl (Ap)

Area
  - Total: 362.97 km^{2} (140.14 sq mi)
  - Land: 346.74 km^{2} (133.88 sq mi)
  - Water: 16.23 km^{2} (6.27 sq mi) 4.5%
  - Rank: #248 in Norway
- Highest elevation: 1,379.51 m (4,526.0 ft)

Population (2025)
  - Total: 3,533
  - Rank: #215 in Norway
  - Density: 9.7/km^{2} (25/sq mi)
  - Change (10 years): ▲ +1%
- Demonym: Sørreisværing

Official language
  - Norwegian form: Neutral
- Time zone: UTC+01:00 (CET)
  - Summer (DST): UTC+02:00 (CEST)
- ISO 3166 code: NO-5526
- Website: Official website

Sørreisa (Northern Sami: Ráisavuona suohkan) is a municipality in Troms county, Norway. The administrative centre of the municipality is the village of Sørreisa. Other villages include Grunnreisa, Skøelva, and Smørsgård.

The 363-square-kilometre (140 sq mi) municipality is the 248th largest by area out of the 357 municipalities in Norway. Sørreisa Municipality is the 218th most populous municipality in Norway with a population of 3,533. The municipality's population density is 9.7 inhabitants per square kilometre (25/sq mi) and its population has increased by 1% over the previous 10-year period.

== General information ==
The municipality of Sørreisen was established on 1 September 1886 when the large Tranøy Municipality was divided into three: Tranøy Municipality (population: 1,239) in the west, Dyrøy Municipality (population: 1,281) in the south, and Sørreisen Municipality (population: 1,361) in the east. Later, the spelling was changed to Sørreisa. During the 1960s, there were many municipal mergers across Norway due to the work of the Schei Committee. On 1 January 1964, the part of Sørreisa Municipality across the Reisafjorden on the island of Senja (population: 129) was transferred to Lenvik Municipality.

On 1 January 2020, the municipality became part of the newly formed Troms og Finnmark county. Previously, it had been part of the old Troms county. On 1 January 2024, the Troms og Finnmark county was divided and the municipality once again became part of Troms county.

=== Name ===
The municipality (originally the parish) is named after the local Reisafjorden (Old Norse: Reisa). The fjord was named after the river Reisaelva which flows into the fjord. The river name is derived from the verb rísa which means "to raise" (referring to flooding). The prefix sør (meaning "southern") was added to the name to distinguish the municipality from the nearby Nordreisa Municipality to the north. Historically, the name of the municipality was spelled Sørreisen. On 6 January 1908, a royal resolution changed the spelling of the name of the municipality to Sørreisa.

=== Coat of arms ===
The coat of arms was granted on 7 September 1984. The official blazon is "Gules, three six-pointed mullets Or" (Norwegian: I rødt 3 seksoddete gull stjerner, to over en). This means the arms have a red field (background) and the charge is three six-pointed stars. Each star has a tincture of Or which means it is commonly colored yellow, but if it is made out of metal, then gold is used. The arms were designed by Ottar Jarl Myrvang. The design was inspired by the oldest seal preserved from Sørreisa. The seal belonged to the local politician Jacob Hansen Kinapel who was a policeman in Sørreisa from 1715 to 1748. His heptagonal 18th century seal shows his initials IHSK around three stars, an eight-pointed star in the centre over two six-pointed stars.

=== Churches ===
The Church of Norway has one parish (sokn) within Sørreisa Municipality. It is part of the Indre Troms prosti (deanery) in the Diocese of Nord-Hålogaland.

Churches in Sørreisa Municipality
Parish (sokn)	Church name	Location of the church	Year built
Sørreisa	Sørreisa Church	Tømmervika	1992
Sørreisa	Skøelv Chapel	Skøelva	1966
Sørreisa	Straumen Chapel	Sørreisa	1973

== Geography ==
Sørreisa is located on the western coast of Norway, along the Reisafjorden, just east of the large island of Senja. The 363-square-kilometre (140 sq mi) municipality is mostly populated along the shoreline. Dyrøy Municipality lies to the west, Salangen Municipality and Bardu Municipality are to the south, Målselv Municipality is to the east, and Senja Municipality is to the north. The highest point in the municipality is the 1,379.51-metre (4,526.0 ft) tall mountain Hjerttinden, a tripoint on the border of Sørreisa Municipality, Salangen Municipality, and Bardu Municipality.

=== Climate ===
Sørreisa has continental subarctic climate. The Köppen Climate Classification subtype for this climate is "Dfc". The Norwegian Meteorological Institute has been operating a weather station in Sørreisa for many years.

Climate data for Sørreisa, Troms
Month	Jan	Feb	Mar	Apr	May	Jun	Jul	Aug	Sep	Oct	Nov	Dec	Year
Mean daily maximum °C (°F)	−4 (25)	−3 (27)	0 (32)	4 (39)	9 (48)	13 (55)	16 (61)	15 (59)	10 (50)	4 (39)	−1 (30)	−3 (27)	5 (41)
Daily mean °C (°F)	−7 (19)	−6 (21)	−4 (25)	0 (32)	6 (43)	10 (50)	13 (55)	11 (52)	7 (45)	2 (36)	−3 (27)	−6 (21)	2 (36)
Mean daily minimum °C (°F)	−10 (14)	−10 (14)	−8 (18)	−3 (27)	2 (36)	6 (43)	9 (48)	7 (45)	3 (37)	−1 (30)	−6 (21)	−9 (16)	−2 (29)
Average rainfall mm (inches)	43.2 (1.70)	43.2 (1.70)	41.8 (1.65)	44.5 (1.75)	55.6 (2.19)	67.1 (2.64)	85.4 (3.36)	83.6 (3.29)	97.1 (3.82)	94.6 (3.72)	56.5 (2.22)	49.1 (1.93)	761.7 (29.97)
Average snowfall cm (inches)	53.6 (21.1)	51.6 (20.3)	34.2 (13.5)	18.3 (7.2)	2.2 (0.9)	0 (0)	0 (0)	0 (0)	0.5 (0.2)	14.6 (5.7)	33.6 (13.2)	45.6 (18.0)	254.2 (100.1)
Average precipitation days (≥ 1 mm)	13.3	11.9	12	11	11	11	12.7	12.7	13.7	15	13.2	14.2	151.7
Average rainy days (≥ 1 mm)	2.5	2.3	3.5	6.3	10.2	11	12.7	12.7	13.5	11.1	4.8	3.4	94
Average snowy days (≥ 1 mm)	7.1	5.8	5	2.3	0.2	0	0	0	0.1	1.7	5	7.1	34.3
Mean daily daylight hours	2.1	7.5	11.8	16.2	21.9	24	23.3	17.7	13.2	9	4	0	12.6
Source 1: WeatherSpark.com
Source 2: Weatherbase.com

== Government ==
Sørreisa Municipality is responsible for primary education (through 10th grade), outpatient health services, senior citizen services, welfare and other social services, zoning, economic development, and municipal roads and utilities. The municipality is governed by a municipal council of directly elected representatives. The mayor is indirectly elected by a vote of the municipal council. The municipality is under the jurisdiction of the Nord-Troms og Senja District Court and the Hålogaland Court of Appeal.

=== Municipal council ===
The municipal council (Kommunestyre) of Sørreisa Municipality is made up of 19 representatives that are elected to four year terms. The tables below show the current and historical composition of the council by political party.

Sørreisa kommunestyre 2023–2027
Party name (in Norwegian)	Number of representatives
Labour Party (Arbeiderpartiet)	8
Progress Party (Fremskrittspartiet)	3
Conservative Party (Høyre)	4
Centre Party (Senterpartiet)	3
Socialist Left Party (Sosialistisk Venstreparti)	1
Total number of members:	19

Sørreisa kommunestyre 2019–2023
Party name (in Norwegian)	Number of representatives
Labour Party (Arbeiderpartiet)	10
Conservative Party (Høyre)	1
Centre Party (Senterpartiet)	4
Socialist Left Party (Sosialistisk Venstreparti)	1
Cooperation List (Samlingslista)	3
Total number of members:	19

Sørreisa kommunestyre 2015–2019
Party name (in Norwegian)	Number of representatives
Labour Party (Arbeiderpartiet)	7
Progress Party (Fremskrittspartiet)	1
Conservative Party (Høyre)	2
Centre Party (Senterpartiet)	1
Cooperation List (Samlingslista)	4
Total number of members:	15

Sørreisa kommunestyre 2011–2015
Party name (in Norwegian)	Number of representatives
Labour Party (Arbeiderpartiet)	5
Progress Party (Fremskrittspartiet)	1
Conservative Party (Høyre)	2
Christian Democratic Party (Kristelig Folkeparti)	1
Centre Party (Senterpartiet)	1
Cooperation List (Samlingslista)	5
Total number of members:	15

Sørreisa kommunestyre 2007–2011
Party name (in Norwegian)	Number of representatives
Labour Party (Arbeiderpartiet)	5
Progress Party (Fremskrittspartiet)	3
Conservative Party (Høyre)	3
Christian Democratic Party (Kristelig Folkeparti)	1
Centre Party (Senterpartiet)	2
Socialist Left Party (Sosialistisk Venstreparti)	1
Cooperation list (Samlingslista)	6
Total number of members:	21

Sørreisa kommunestyre 2003–2007
Party name (in Norwegian)	Number of representatives
Labour Party (Arbeiderpartiet)	10
Progress Party (Fremskrittspartiet)	3
Conservative Party (Høyre)	3
Christian Democratic Party (Kristelig Folkeparti)	2
Centre Party (Senterpartiet)	1
Socialist Left Party (Sosialistisk Venstreparti)	2
Total number of members:	21

Sørreisa kommunestyre 1999–2003
Party name (in Norwegian)	Number of representatives
Labour Party (Arbeiderpartiet)	10
Conservative Party (Høyre)	5
Christian Democratic Party (Kristelig Folkeparti)	2
Centre Party (Senterpartiet)	2
Socialist Left Party (Sosialistisk Venstreparti)	2
Total number of members:	21

Sørreisa kommunestyre 1995–1999
Party name (in Norwegian)	Number of representatives
Labour Party (Arbeiderpartiet)	11
Conservative Party (Høyre)	3
Christian Democratic Party (Kristelig Folkeparti)	2
Centre Party (Senterpartiet)	4
Socialist Left Party (Sosialistisk Venstreparti)	1
Total number of members:	21

Sørreisa kommunestyre 1991–1995
Party name (in Norwegian)	Number of representatives
Labour Party (Arbeiderpartiet)	12
Conservative Party (Høyre)	3
Christian Democratic Party (Kristelig Folkeparti)	1
Centre Party (Senterpartiet)	3
Socialist Left Party (Sosialistisk Venstreparti)	2
Total number of members:	21

Sørreisa kommunestyre 1987–1991
Party name (in Norwegian)	Number of representatives
Labour Party (Arbeiderpartiet)	13
Conservative Party (Høyre)	4
Christian Democratic Party (Kristelig Folkeparti)	2
Centre Party (Senterpartiet)	1
Socialist Left Party (Sosialistisk Venstreparti)	1
Total number of members:	21

Sørreisa kommunestyre 1983–1987
Party name (in Norwegian)	Number of representatives
Labour Party (Arbeiderpartiet)	15
Conservative Party (Høyre)	4
Christian Democratic Party (Kristelig Folkeparti)	1
Centre Party (Senterpartiet)	1
Total number of members:	21

Sørreisa kommunestyre 1979–1983
Party name (in Norwegian)	Number of representatives
Labour Party (Arbeiderpartiet)	14
Conservative Party (Høyre)	4
Christian Democratic Party (Kristelig Folkeparti)	2
Centre Party (Senterpartiet)	1
Total number of members:	21

Sørreisa kommunestyre 1975–1979
Party name (in Norwegian)	Number of representatives
Labour Party (Arbeiderpartiet)	13
Conservative Party (Høyre)	2
Christian Democratic Party (Kristelig Folkeparti)	2
Centre Party (Senterpartiet)	3
Socialist Left Party (Sosialistisk Venstreparti)	1
Total number of members:	21

Sørreisa kommunestyre 1971–1975
Party name (in Norwegian)	Number of representatives
Labour Party (Arbeiderpartiet)	13
Christian Democratic Party (Kristelig Folkeparti)	2
Centre Party (Senterpartiet)	3
Local List(s) (Lokale lister)	3
Total number of members:	21

Sørreisa kommunestyre 1967–1971
Party name (in Norwegian)	Number of representatives
Labour Party (Arbeiderpartiet)	12
Christian Democratic Party (Kristelig Folkeparti)	1
Centre Party (Senterpartiet)	2
Local List(s) (Lokale lister)	6
Total number of members:	21

Sørreisa kommunestyre 1963–1967
Party name (in Norwegian)	Number of representatives
Labour Party (Arbeiderpartiet)	12
Christian Democratic Party (Kristelig Folkeparti)	2
Centre Party (Senterpartiet)	2
Local List(s) (Lokale lister)	5
Total number of members:	21

Sørreisa herredsstyre 1959–1963
Party name (in Norwegian)	Number of representatives
Labour Party (Arbeiderpartiet)	14
Christian Democratic Party (Kristelig Folkeparti)	3
Centre Party (Senterpartiet)	3
Local List(s) (Lokale lister)	1
Total number of members:	21

Sørreisa herredsstyre 1955–1959
Party name (in Norwegian)	Number of representatives
Labour Party (Arbeiderpartiet)	14
Communist Party (Kommunistiske Parti)	1
Christian Democratic Party (Kristelig Folkeparti)	4
List of workers, fishermen, and small farmholders (Arbeidere, fiskere, småbrukere liste)	2
Total number of members:	21

Sørreisa herredsstyre 1951–1955
Party name (in Norwegian)	Number of representatives
Labour Party (Arbeiderpartiet)	10
Christian Democratic Party (Kristelig Folkeparti)	5
List of workers, fishermen, and small farmholders (Arbeidere, fiskere, småbrukere liste)	1
Total number of members:	16

Sørreisa herredsstyre 1947–1951
Party name (in Norwegian)	Number of representatives
Labour Party (Arbeiderpartiet)	9
Christian Democratic Party (Kristelig Folkeparti)	3
Local List(s) (Lokale lister)	4
Total number of members:	16

Sørreisa herredsstyre 1945–1947
Party name (in Norwegian)	Number of representatives
Labour Party (Arbeiderpartiet)	11
Local List(s) (Lokale lister)	5
Total number of members:	16

Sørreisa herredsstyre 1937–1941*
Party name (in Norwegian)	Number of representatives
Labour Party (Arbeiderpartiet)	12
List of workers, fishermen, and small farmholders (Arbeidere, fiskere, småbrukere liste)	4
Total number of members:	16
Note: Due to the German occupation of Norway during World War II, no elections were held for new municipal councils until after the war ended in 1945.

=== Mayors ===
The mayor (Norwegian: ordfører) of Sørreisa Municipality is the political leader of the municipality and the chairperson of the municipal council. Here is a list of people who have held this position:

- 1886–1888: Jacob Moe
- 1889–1907: Johan Jørgensen
- 1908–1925: Ingvald Andersen (V)
- 1926–1928: Hans Nordgård
- 1929–1940: Kristian Simonsen (Ap)
- 1942–1945: Oliver Krogstad (NS)
- 1945–1952: Kristian Simonsen (Ap)
- 1953–1969: Thoralf Dalseth (Ap)
- 1970–1982: Arnold W. Johansen (Ap)
- 1982–1991: Kjell Bakkland (Ap)
- 1992–1999: Paul Dahlø (Ap)
- 1999–2007: Magnor Olsen (Ap)
- 2007–2011: Knut H. Olsen (H)
- 2011–2015: Paul Dahlø (Ap)
- 2015–present: Jan-Eirik Nordahl (Ap)

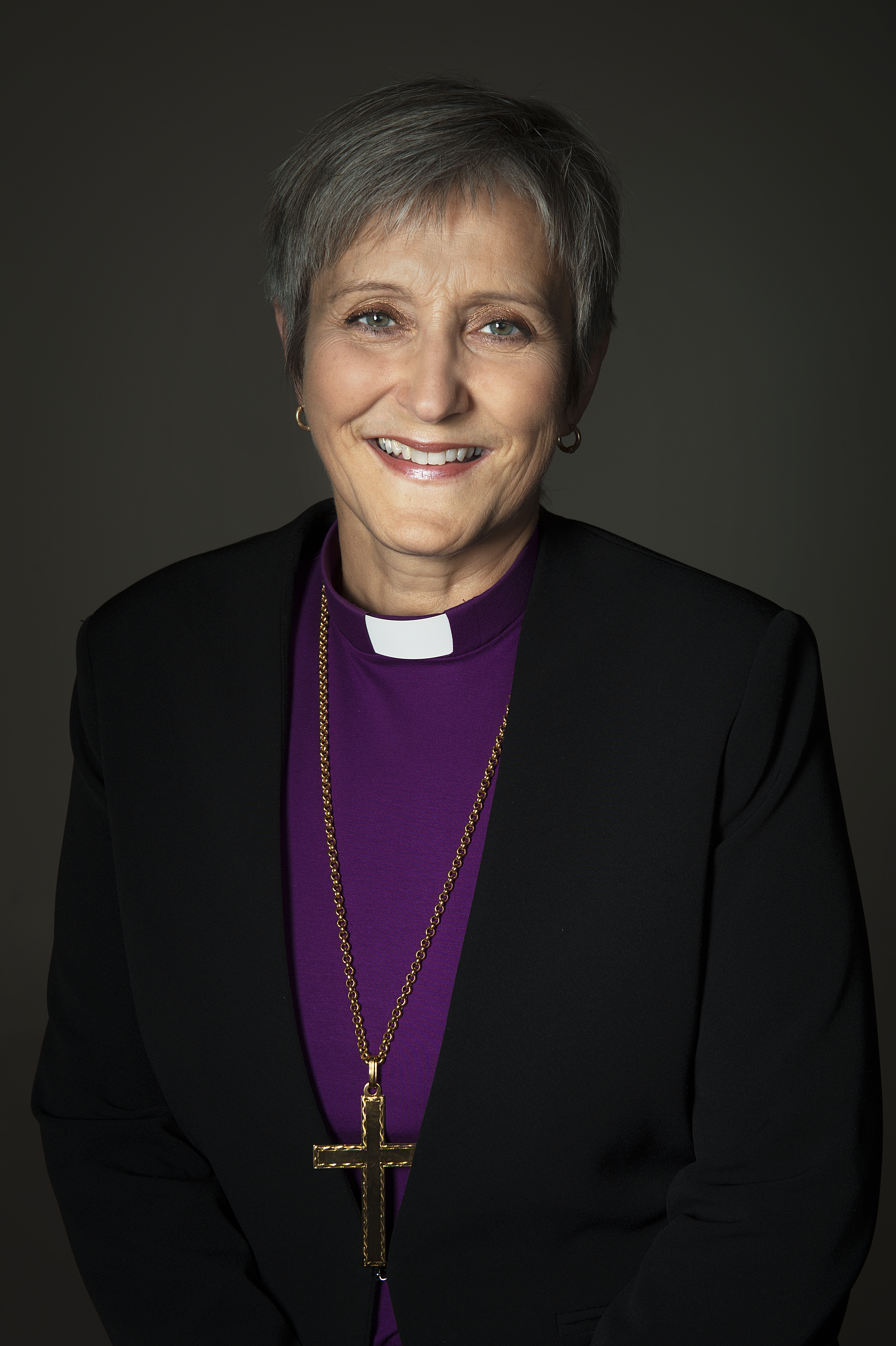
Herborg Finnset, 2017

== Notable people ==
- Amalie Øvergaard (1874 in Sørreisa – 1960), a women's leader in Norway
- Berger Torrissen (1901 in Sørreisa – 1991), an American skier, competed in the 1936 Winter Olympics for the USA
- Willy Ovesen (1924 in Sørreisa – 2015), a civil servant, director of the Norwegian Tax Administration from 1982 to 1994
- Herborg Finnset (born 1961 in Sørreisa), a prelate of the Church of Norway and the Bishop of Nidaros from 2018
- Tore Rismo (born 1961 in Sørreisa), a retired football midfielder
- Siri Pettersen (born 1971), a writer and comics creator, brought up in Sørreisa
- Erik Valnes (born 1994), a cross-country skier

== Gallery ==
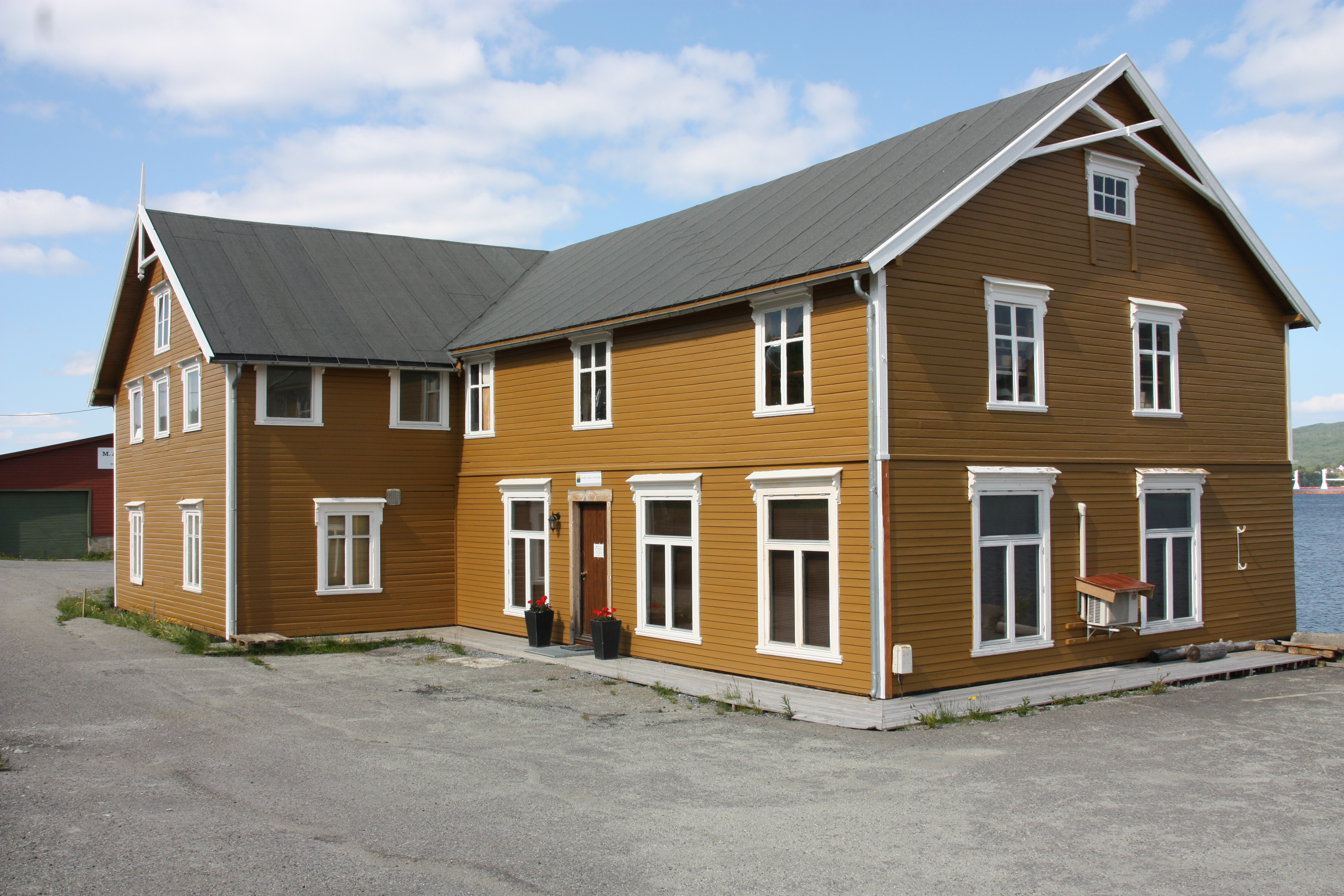
Kramvigbrygga, part of Midt-Troms museum

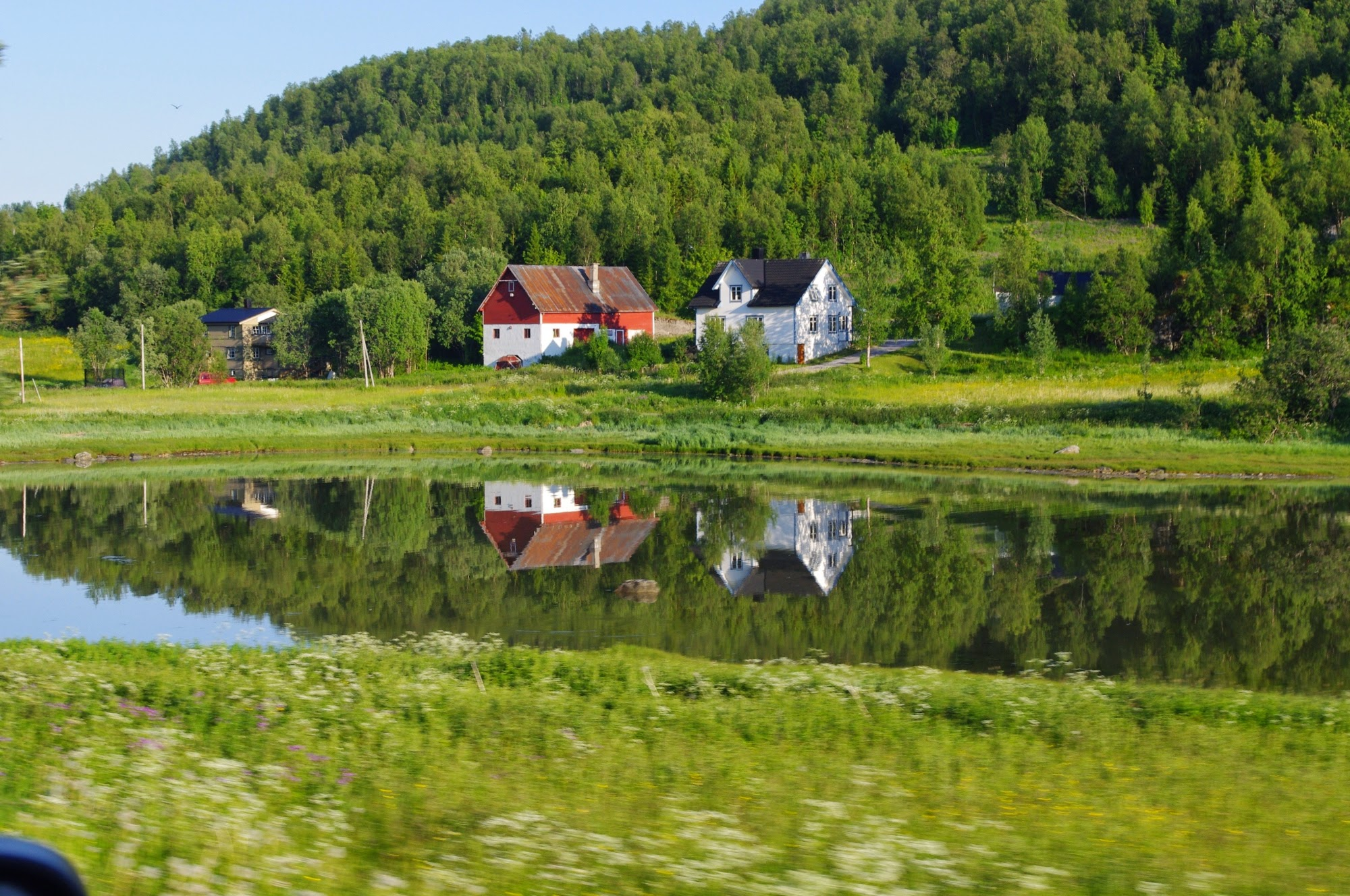
Sørreisa, Norway

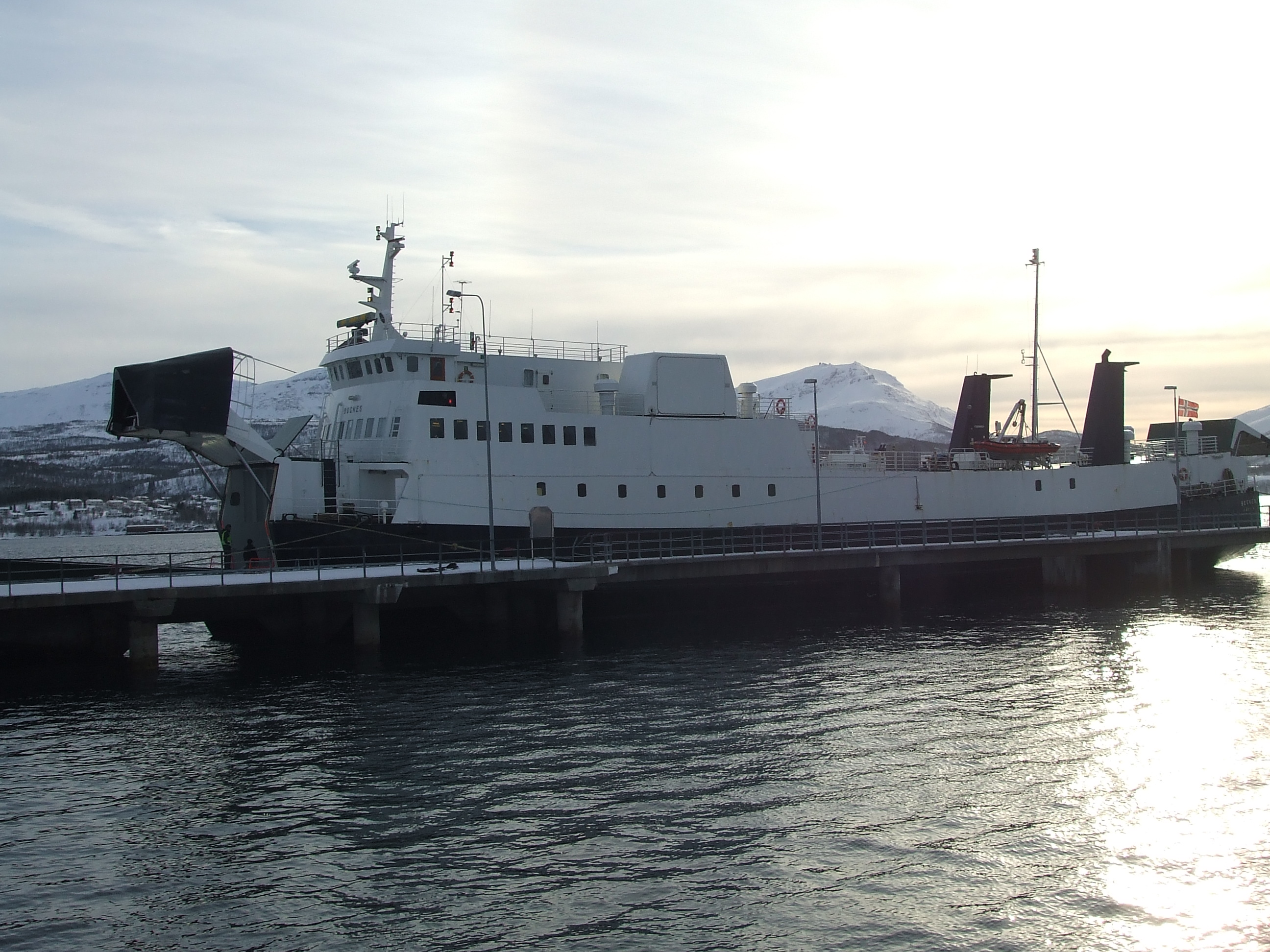
M/S Bognes, Soerreisa 2007

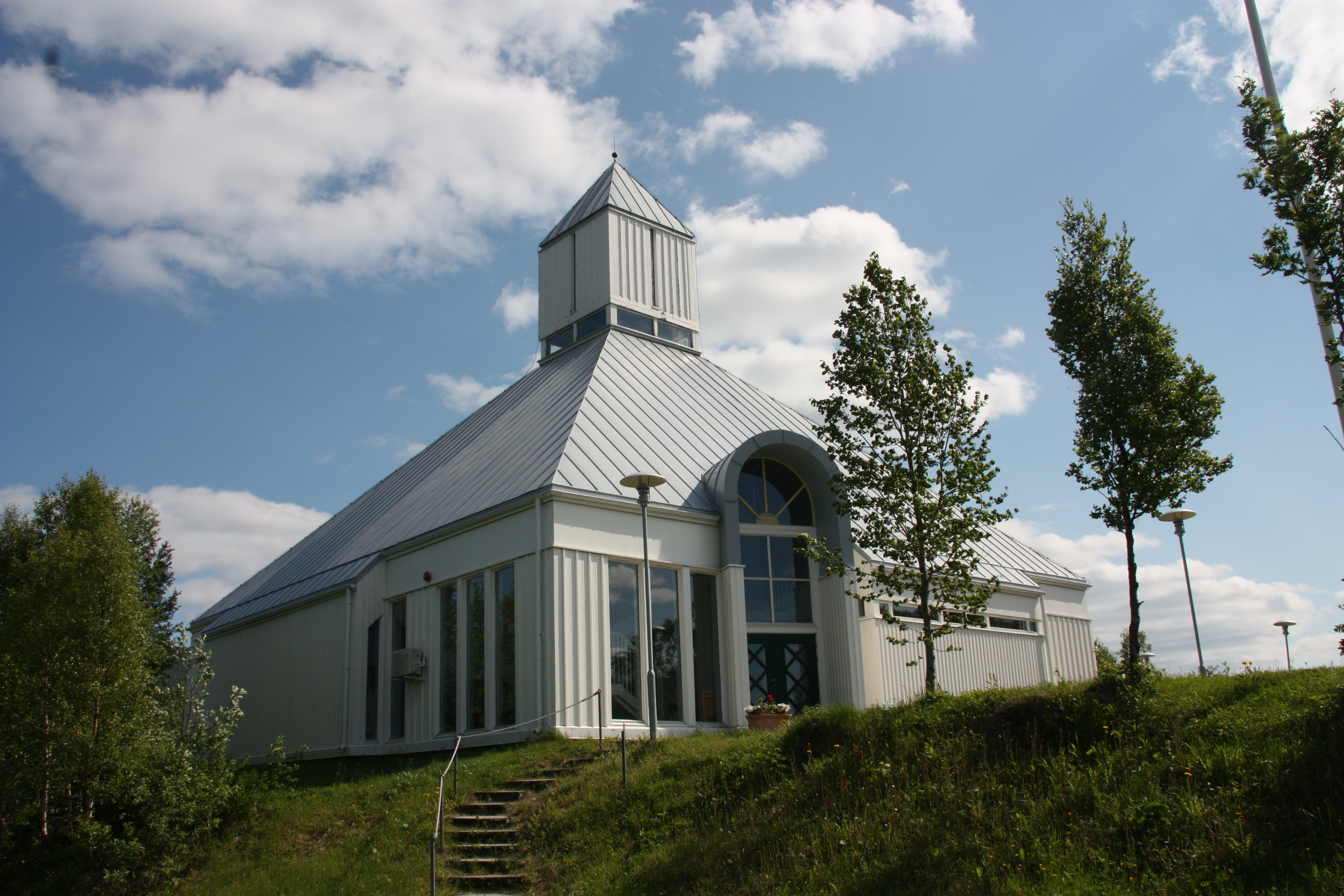
Sørreisa church
