= Julius Christensen =

Norwegian politician (1840–1923)

Mayor of Sandefjord
- In office 1894–1897

Mayor of Sandefjord
- In office 1907–1910

Deputy representative to the Parliament of Norway
- In office 1906–1909
- In office 1913–1915

Personal details
- Born: 12 June 1840 Sandefjord, Norway
- Died: October 19, 1923 (aged 82)
- Occupation: Doctor, politician

Julius Christensen (6 December 1840 – 19 October 1923) was a Norwegian doctor and politician for the Conservative Party.

He was born in Sandefjord as a son of ship-owner and merchant Søren Lorents Christensen (1810–1862) and Othilie Juliane Kruge (1820–1903). He was the elder brother of military officer Sophus Christensen and whaler Christen Christensen, and through the latter an uncle of Lars Christensen.

He started his working career at sea, and took the shipmate examination. In 1862 he returned to land, finishing his secondary education in 1864. He enrolled at the Royal Frederick University where he graduated from with the cand.med. degree in 1871. He studied abroad for one year, mostly in Vienna. In September 1871 he married governess and later cookbook pioneer Dorothea von der Lippe Frost, settling in Sandefjord as a private doctor. He remained here for the rest of his career, he was also a doctor during the Jarlsberg Line construction (1878–1882) as well as savings bank director from 1880.

He was a member of the municipal council of Sandeherred Municipality from 1880 to 1884, then mayor of Sandefjord Municipality from 1894 to 1897. In the 1906 Norwegian parliamentary election he was elected as a deputy representative to the Parliament of Norway from the constituency Larvik og Sandefjord. In the 1907 Norwegian local elections he again became mayor of Sandefjord, this time serving until 1910. He was elected to another term as deputy representative to Parliament for the term 1913–1915.

He was the father of the doctor Reidar Gording and paternal grandfather of Elisabeth Gording. He died in October 1923.
