= Amalie Øvergaard =

Norwegian activist

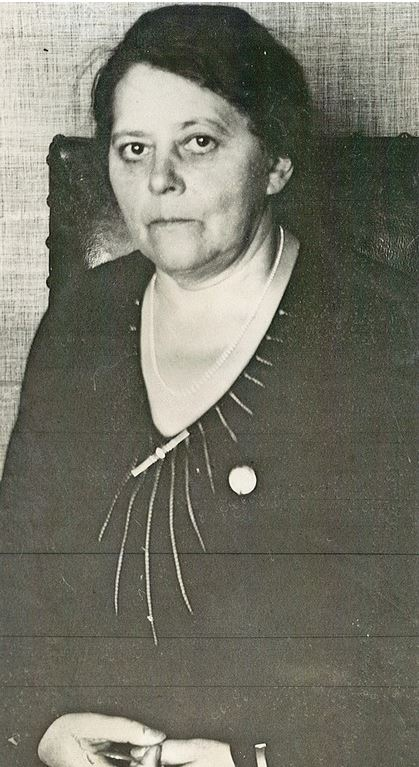

Amalie Constance Øvergaard, née Angell (3 March 1874 – 19 November 1960) was a Norwegian women's leader.

She was born in Sørreisa Municipality as a daughter of businessman Ingebrigt Angell and Severine Johansen. From 1899 she was married to ship-owner Ragnvald Øvergaard (1866–1923).

She had middle school and commerce school. After marrying she was a housewife, but became active in the Norwegian Housewives' Association, and was for many years the organization's informal financial leader. In 1934 she became the second president of the association. After withdrawing in 1946 she became honorary president. She also chaired the Nordic Housewives' Association from 1945.

Øvergaard especially emphasized the housewives' economic role, urging her members to familiarize themselves with both state and home economics. The organization also cooperated more with the banking and insurance industry during her time as leader. She died in November 1960 and was buried at Vestre gravlund.

Non-profit organization positions
Preceded by Marie Michelet	Chair of the Norwegian Housewives' Association; 1934–1946 (intermittently replaced by Elisabeth Falch-Svenøe and Betty Thorsen during the occupation)	Succeeded by Alette Engelhart
