= Skøelva =

Village in Sørreisa Municipality, Norway

Skøelva Skøelv
- Village
- Interactive map of Skøelva
- Location within Troms Location within Norway
- Coordinates: 69°07′54″N 18°03′01″E
- Country: Norway
- Region: Northern Norway
- County: Troms
- District: Midt-Troms
- Municipality: Sørreisa Municipality

Area
  - Total: 0.44 km^{2} (0.17 sq mi)
- Elevation: 6 m (20 ft)

Population (2023)
  - Total: 305
  - Density: 693/km^{2} (1,790/sq mi)
- Time zone: UTC+01:00 (CET)
  - Summer (DST): UTC+02:00 (CEST)
- Post Code: 9310 Sørreisa

Skøelva or Skøelv is the second largest village in Sørreisa Municipality in Troms county, Norway. The village is located along the Reisafjorden, about 5 kilometres (3.1 mi) west of the municipal centre of Sørreisa. The village is located along the mouth of the river Skøelva. Skøelv Chapel is located in the village.

The 0.44-square-kilometre (110-acre) village has a population (2023) of 305 and a population density of 693 inhabitants per square kilometre (1,790/sq mi).
