= Synnøve Brenden Klemetrud =

Norwegian politician (born 1959)

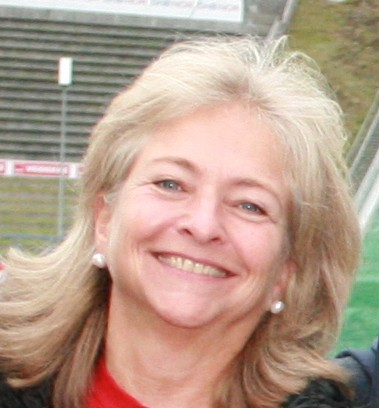
Synnøve Brenden

Synnøve Brenden (born 5 July 1959) is a Norwegian politician for the Labour Party.

During the cabinet Jagland, she was appointed political advisor in the Ministry of Agriculture. She has later served as a deputy representative to the Norwegian Parliament from Oppland during the terms 2001–2005 and 2005–2009.

She is the former mayor of Lillehammer, having assumed the position in the period from 1999 to 2011.

She is also a board member of Film & Kino.
