= Elisabeth Gording =

Norwegian actress (1907–2001)

Elisabeth Jeremiassen Gording (2 October 1907 – 29 October 2001) was a Norwegian actress.

== Personal life ==
Gording was born in Kristiania as a daughter of physician Reidar Gording (1873–1952) and Borghild Jeremiassen (1872–1965). The family resided at Slemdal. She was a paternal granddaughter of Julius and Dorothea Christensen, and a maternal granddaughter of Johan Jeremiassen. From 1932 to 1940 she was married to psychiatrist Odd Havrevold, during which time she was a sister-in-law of Olafr Havrevold, Alf Ihlen and Finn Havrevold.

== Career ==
Gording studied acting, dance and mime in Vienna under Max Huber, later Joseph Fraenzel. She was employed at Nationaltheatret between 1933 and 1954. The exception was during the occupation of Norway by Nazi Germany, when she in 1941 was summoned to the police headquarters at Victoria Terrasse. She had rejected an order to play in Nazi-controlled radio, and was revoked of her working permit as actress, along with five other actors. This incident sparked a theatre strike which lasted for five weeks, and affected the theatres in Norway for the rest of the war.

Her stage debut was as the character "Milja" in Oskar Braaten's play Ungen, in October 1932. In the fall of 1933 she played in Strindberg's Till Damaskus, and in an adaptation of O'Neill's The Hairy Ape. In November 1935 she played in Friedrich Wolff's play Professor Mamlocks utvei, staged by Gerda Ring; a contribution against the prosecution of Jews in Germany. In Borgen's first play, Kontorsjef Lie, she played a child's character. She also played one of the children in an adaptation of Caldwell's Tobacco Road in 1936. Nordahl Grieg's play Nederlaget premiered in March 1937, staged by Agnes Mowinckel, and Gording played the character of a working class woman.

After returning to studies in the mid-1950s, she founded the children's theatre academy Barnas Teater. It changed its name to Barne- og Ungdomsteatret Elisabeth Gording in 1963. In 1985 she herself penned the history on the academy's first 25 years. The academy went defunct in its first incarnation in 1999. A new Oslo Barne- og Ungdomsteater was founded in 2000, but Gording died in October 2001. She had been decorated as a Knight, First Class of the Order of St. Olav in 1982, and received the Fritt Ord Honorary Award in 1990.
