= SK Skuld =

Norwegian skiing club

Skuld Ski Club (Skiklubben Skuld) is a Norwegian skiing club, based in Oslo.

The club was founded by Claus Frimann-Dahl, Andreas Moestue, Finn Moestue, Haavard Holter and Henning Brodtkorp on 9 January 1886, and is named after Skuld, one of the norns of Norse mythology.

The club rented cabins at Ullevålseter from 1889 to 1891 and Aamot in Sørkedalen from 1892 to 1893. In 1894 their own cabin was built at Ullevålseter, Skuldstua. It thereby became one of the exclusive "ski cabin clubs" in Oslo.

Skuld was active in skiing from 1892, and had several able competitors. Founder Claus Frimann-Dahl won the Ladies' Cup and finished second in the Nordic combined at the Holmenkollen Ski Festival in 1896. Eivind Roll won the Ladies' Cup in 1897, and also achieved a hill record in Holmenkollbakken. W. B. Samson won the first ski competition in Austria in 1893. The club's foremost administrator was Hassa Horn, Jr., who chaired the Association for the Promotion of Skiing and the Norwegian Ski Federation.

Skuld has today 21 members who meet at Skuldstua for traditional club evenings also sometimes with lectures.

Presidents in Skuld: Period 1886-1952: Finn Moestue, Olaf Lilleboe, Andreas Ringnes, Nils Backer-Grøndahl. 1952-1961: L.J. Moltke-Hansen, 1961-1983: Henning Astrup, 1983-1985: Ferdinand Juell, 1985-1987: Edvard Heiberg, 1987-2007: Arvid Heiberg, 2007-2020: Thor Furuholmen, 2020 - : Knut M. Ore.
