= Alette Engelhart =

Norwegian housewives' leader

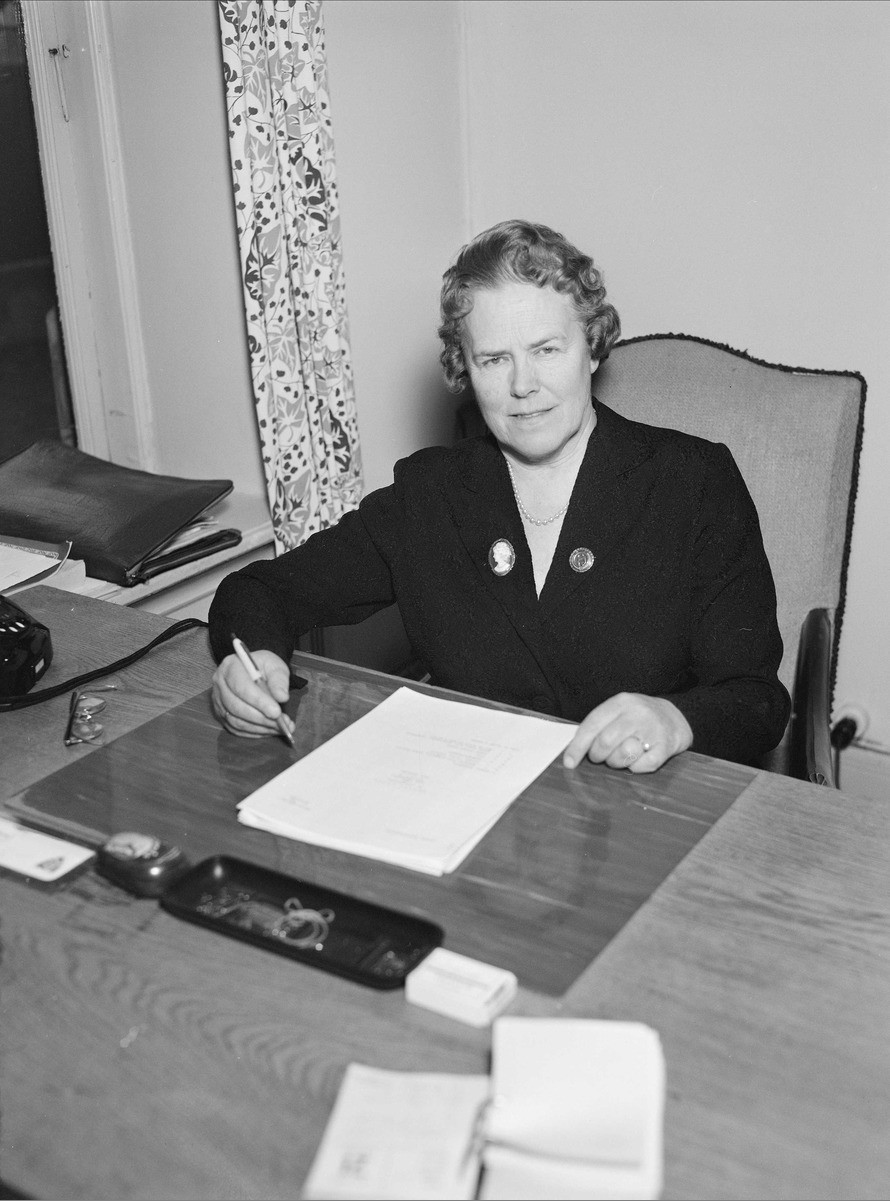
Alette Engelhart, 1958.

Alette Marie Engelhart, née Nicolaysen (7 May 1896 – 13 August 1984) was a Norwegian housewives' leader.

== Biography ==
Alette was born in Kristiania as a daughter of captain and engineer Anton Martin Schweigaard Nicolaysen (1870–1907) and Dorothea Jeanette Horn (1870–1943). She was a niece of Hassa Horn and a grandniece of Hassa Horn, Sr. She finished her secondary education at Frogner School in 1915, and graduated as a teacher from Nissen School in 1916. After four years as a teacher at Frogner School, in 1920 she married veterinarian Bernt Engelhart (1889–1961), a son of politician Thomas von Westen Engelhart. The family moved around in Norway a lot, among others to Harstad and Eidsvoll.

Mrs. Engelhart became active in the Norwegian Housewives' Association (from 1997: the Norwegian Women and Family Association), and after the occupation of Norway by Nazi Germany when her housewife association work had largely been abandoned, she took the helm of the whole organization in 1946, chairing it until 1959. She was also a member of several committees and councils to improve housework and home economics, and she was a board member of the Norwegian National Women's Council. From 1956 to 1960 she chaired the Nordic Housewives' Association. She chaired the United Nations Association of Norway from 1948 to 1952, and was active in Foreningen Norden and Landsforeningen Norsk Arbeide. She was decorated as a Knight, First Class of the Order of St. Olav in 1955.

Dame Engelhardt died in August 1984 in Oslo.

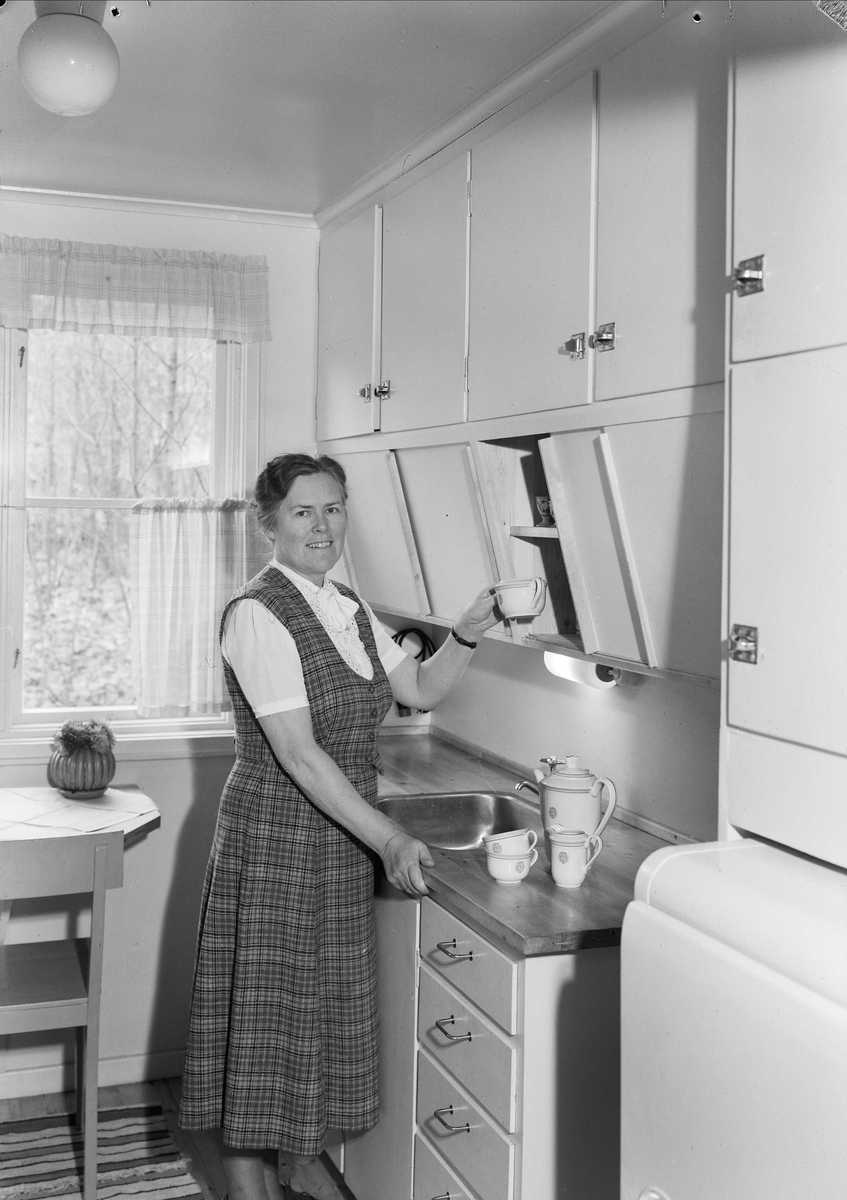
Alette Engelhart, 1950.

Preceded by Amalie Øvergaard	Chair of the Norwegian Housewives' Association; 1946–1959	Succeeded by Else Germeten
