= Sophus Christensen =

Norwegian military officer

Sophus Christensen (22 January 1848 – 24 January 1920) was a Norwegian military officer.

== Personal life ==
He was born in Sandefjord as a son of ship-owner and merchant Søren Lorents Christensen (1810–1862) and Othilie Juliane Kruge (1820–1903). He was a younger brother of physician and politician Julius Christensen and whaler Christen Christensen. Through the former he was a brother-in-law of Dorothea Christensen, and through the latter an uncle of Lars Christensen.

In 1894 he married physician's daughter Margrethe Castberg Ebbesen from Sandefjord. She was a daughter of mayor Jørgen Tandberg Ebbesen. The couple settled in Langesund.

== Career ==
Christensen became an officer in 1870, and after attending the Central School in Kristiania and Stockholm in 1874–1875 he reached the rank of Premier Lieutenant. He notably participated in the Russo-Turkish War of 1877–1878. His main career was in Norway, though, and via Captain in 1889 he reached the rank of lieutenant colonel in 1902. He belonged to the Sixth Brigade, then the First Brigade from 1906. He retired from active service in 1908.

He was among the founders of the interest organization Norges Forsvarsforening in 1886, was active here, and wrote prolifically for the reconstruction and expansion of Norway's armed forces. Pieces include Om den norske Hærs Krigsdygtighed (1880), Nationen og Armeen (1898), Infanteriets øvelser og sagkyndigheden (1898), Legemsøvelser i folkeskolen (1900) and Forsvarets Genrejsning (1901). In Nationen og Armeen, he argued that war in itself was a necessary baptism by fire, and that war contributed to the evolution of mankind. He became often referred to by the Norwegian labour movement, since he proposed budget increases that the labour movement thought too high.

He was decorated as a Commander of the Order of St. Olav and a Knight, Second Class of the Russian Order of St. Anna and the Order of Saint Stanislaus.

Christensen died in January 1920 and was buried in Sandar Municipality. A memorial stone was raised at his grave by "Friends of the Norwegian Defence".
