= Hassa Horn Sr. =

Norwegian civil servant

Hassa Horn Sr. (16 March 1837 – 11 December 1921) was a Norwegian civil servant.

He was born in Frederiksvern of customs inspector Hans Jokum Horn and Anna Grønbech Aas. Together with Alette Gram (1844–1933), whom he married in 1869, he had the son Hassa Horn Jr. who was a notable industrialist and married twice; to daughters of Peter Birch-Reichenwald and Johan Steen. Their daughter Dorothea was the mother of national housewives' leader Alette Nicolaysen.

He finished his secondary education in 1855 and graduated from the Royal Frederick University with the cand.jur. degree in 1860. After some years as an attorney, he became clerk in the Ministry of Church Affairs in 1864. He advanced to assistant secretary in 1873 and deputy under-secretary in 1879. In 1886 reached the pinnacle of his career as he was appointed as chief administrative officer of the third magistrate department in Kristiania Municipality, the capital city of Norway. He held the position from late 1886 to 1909 with the title burgomaster. He was the capital's highest-ranking civil servant responsible for education, libraries and church affairs.

He was decorated as a Commander, Second Class of the Order of St. Olav and the Order of the Dannebrog. He died in December 1921.
