= Hjemmenes Vel =

Norwegian women's organization

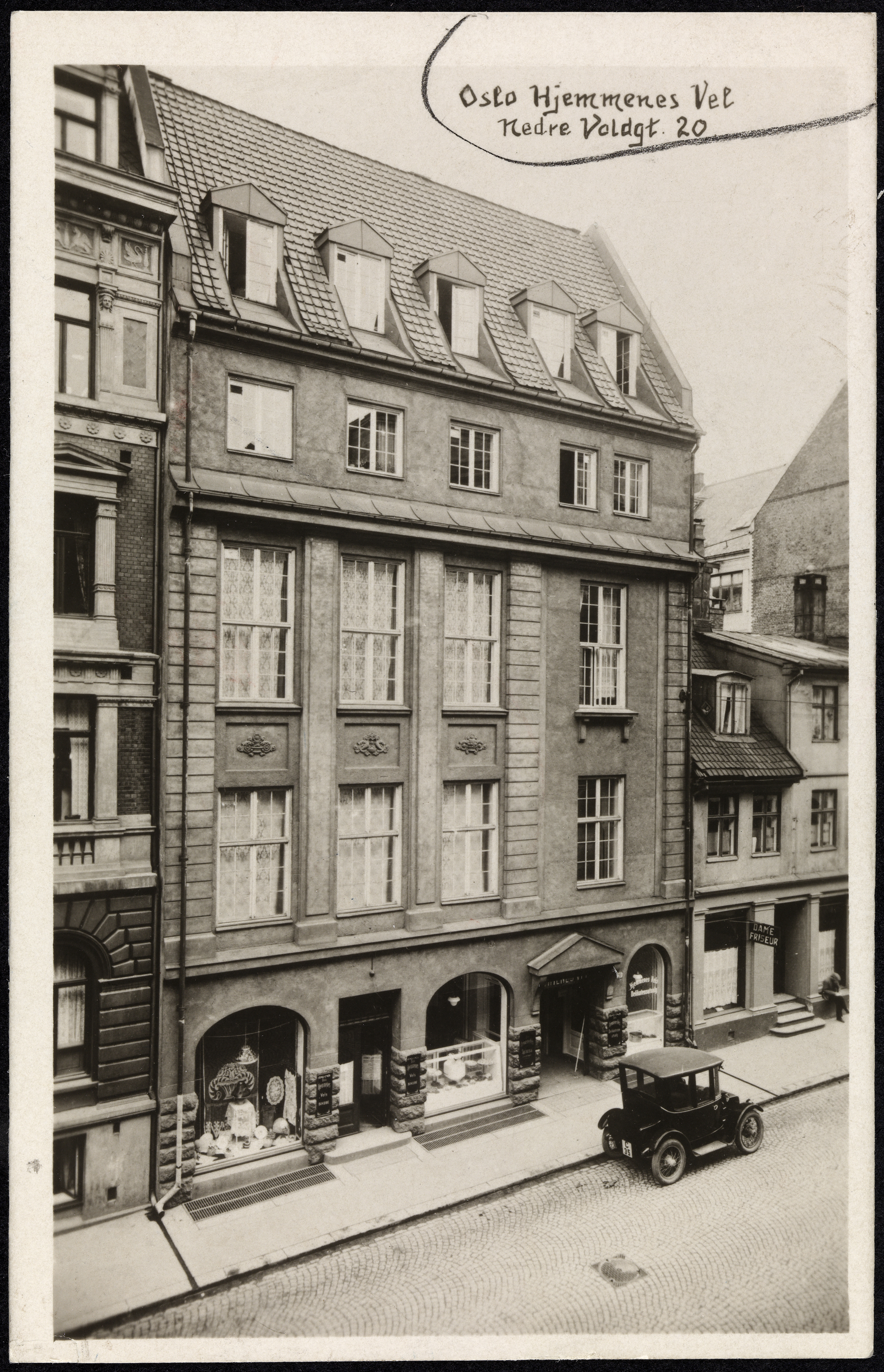
Hjemmenes Vel in Oslo's Nedre Voldgate

Hjemmenes Vel (Welfare in the Home), later Norges Husmorforbund (Norwegian Housewives' Association), was Norway's first association for housewives. Founded in Oslo (then Christiania) by Dorothea Christensen in 1898, it was also the first organization for housewives in Europe. The association functioned until the late 1970s.

In 1897, Christensen had published an article in Husmoderen (The Housewife) titled "Vi husmødre slutter os sammen" (We housewives should stick together) which paved the way for the establishment of Hjemmenes Vel on 10 March 1898.

Based on the success of the Oslo organization, local Hjemmenes Vel branches were established throughout the country. As a result, in 1915 Hjemmenes Vels Landsforbund or national headquarters was founded by Marie Michelet who chaired it until 1934. By 1924, there were some 50 local organizations in Norway. From the start, Hjemmenes Vels Landsforbund was associated with the Norwegian National Women's Council. In 1933, the organization changed its name to Norges Husmorforbund or Norwegian Housewives' Association. It became a large, influential organization with 30,000 members by 1940, providing advice on nutrition, housekeeping, childcare and economics. Husmorbladet (Housewives Magazine) was published from 1952.

The association was particularly successful in the years up to 1960 when there were 70,000 members. Thereafter, as women began to take up employment, interest in the organization gradually faded until it was no longer viable.

== Leaders of the organization ==
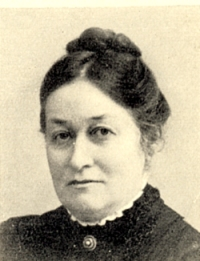
Dorothea Christensen

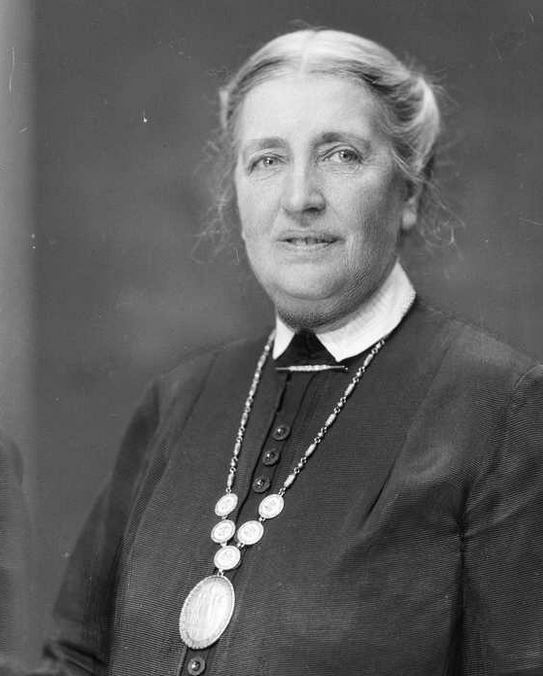
Marie Michelet

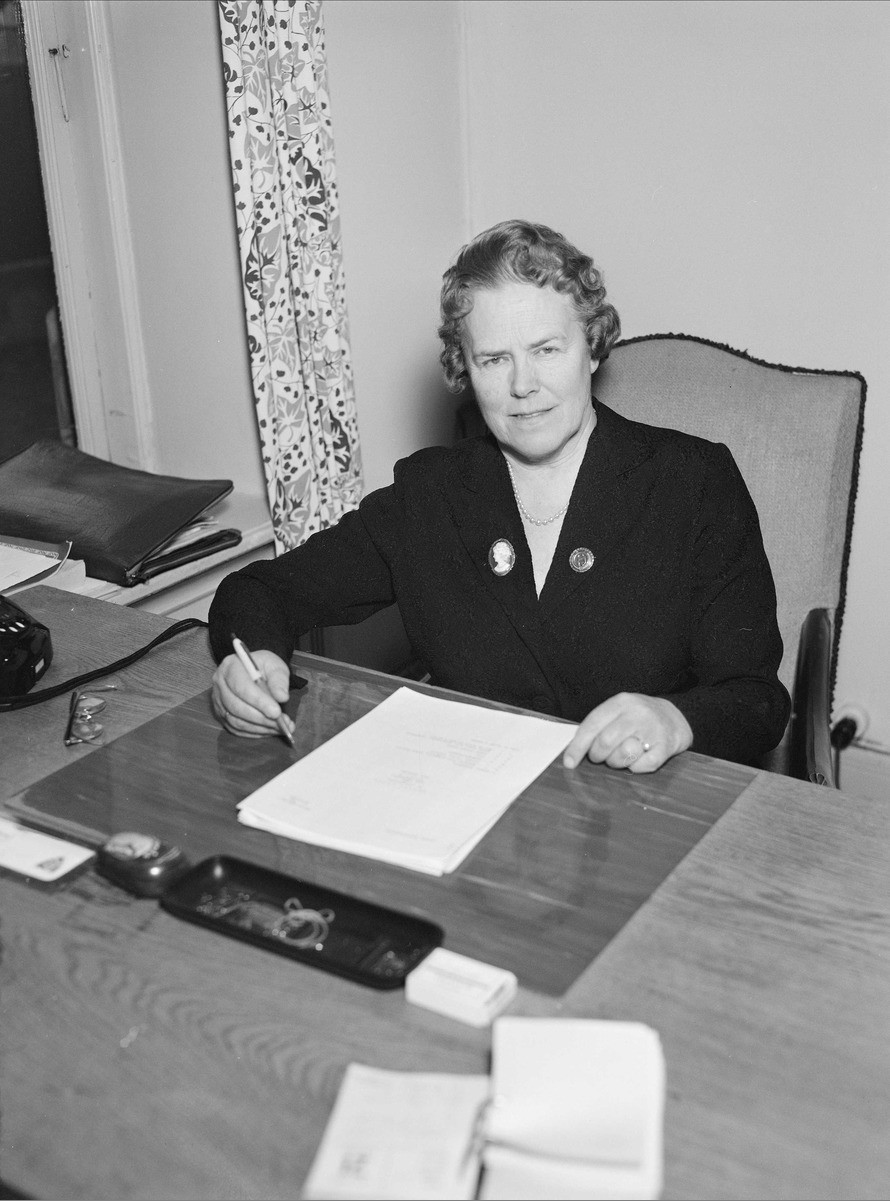
Alette Engelhart

The organization was founded as Hjemmenes Vel in 1898, was renamed Norges Husmorforbund in 1933 and finally became Norges Kvinne- og familieforbund in 1997.

=== Hjemmenes Vel ===
- Dorothea Christensen, 1898–1908

=== Norges Husmorforbund ===
- Marie Michelet, 1915–1934
- Amalie Øvergaard 1934–1946
- Alette Engelhart 1946–1959
- Else Germeten 1959–1969
- Elin Wedege 1969–1977
- Dagmar Storås 1977–1981
- Karin Gullichsen 1981–1985
- Ingunn Birkeland 1985–1993
- Anne Marit Hovstad 1993–1997

=== Norges Kvinne- og familieforbund ===
- Elisabeth Rusdal, 1997–2001
- Bjarnhild Hodneland, 2001–2006
- Ann-Louis Nordstrand, 2006–2008
- Toril Sonja Gravdal, 2008–2009
- Grete Nordbæk fungerende forbundsleder, 2009–2010
- Elisabeth Rusdal, 2010-
