= Sørreisa (village) =

Village in Sørreisa Municipality, Norway

Sørreisa: Sørreisa (Norwegian); Orjješ-Ráisa (Northern Sami)
- Village
- Interactive map of Sørreisa
- Location within Troms Location within Norway
- Coordinates: 69.14526°N 18.15292°E
- Country: Norway
- Region: Northern Norway
- County: Troms
- District: Midt-Troms
- Municipality: Sørreisa Municipality

Area
  - Total: 1.38 km^{2} (0.53 sq mi)
- Elevation: 8 m (26 ft)

Population (2023)
  - Total: 1,271
  - Density: 921/km^{2} (2,390/sq mi)
- Time zone: UTC+01:00 (CET)
  - Summer (DST): UTC+02:00 (CEST)
- Post Code: 9310 Sørreisa

Sørreisa (Norwegian) or Orjješ-Ráisa (Northern Sami) is the administrative centre of Sørreisa Municipality in Troms county, Norway. The village (also known as Straumen) is located at the eastern end of the Reisafjorden, an arm off of the main Solbergfjorden, and north of the lake Reisvatnet. The village of Skøelva is located about 5 kilometres (3.1 mi) southwest of Sørreisa.

Sørreisa is the location of the intersection of Norwegian County Road 86 and Norwegian County Road 84. Straumen Chapel is the main church for the village. The 1.38-square-kilometre (340-acre) village has a population (2023) of 1,271 and a population density of 921 inhabitants per square kilometre (2,390/sq mi).
