= Gunnar Germeten =

Norwegian civil servant

Gunnar Germeten (1918–1995) was a Norwegian civil servant.

He was born in Stavanger, and held the cand.jur. degree in law. He was a subdirector in the Norwegian Directorate of Rationalisation from 1955 to 1965 and then in the Ministry of Local Government and Labour from 1965 to 1972. From 1972 to 1987 he was deputy under-secretary of state in the Ministry of the Environment. He was also board chairman of Kommunale Kinematografers Landsforbund from 1961 to 1976.
