= Hassa Horn Jr. =

Norwegian politician (1873–1968)

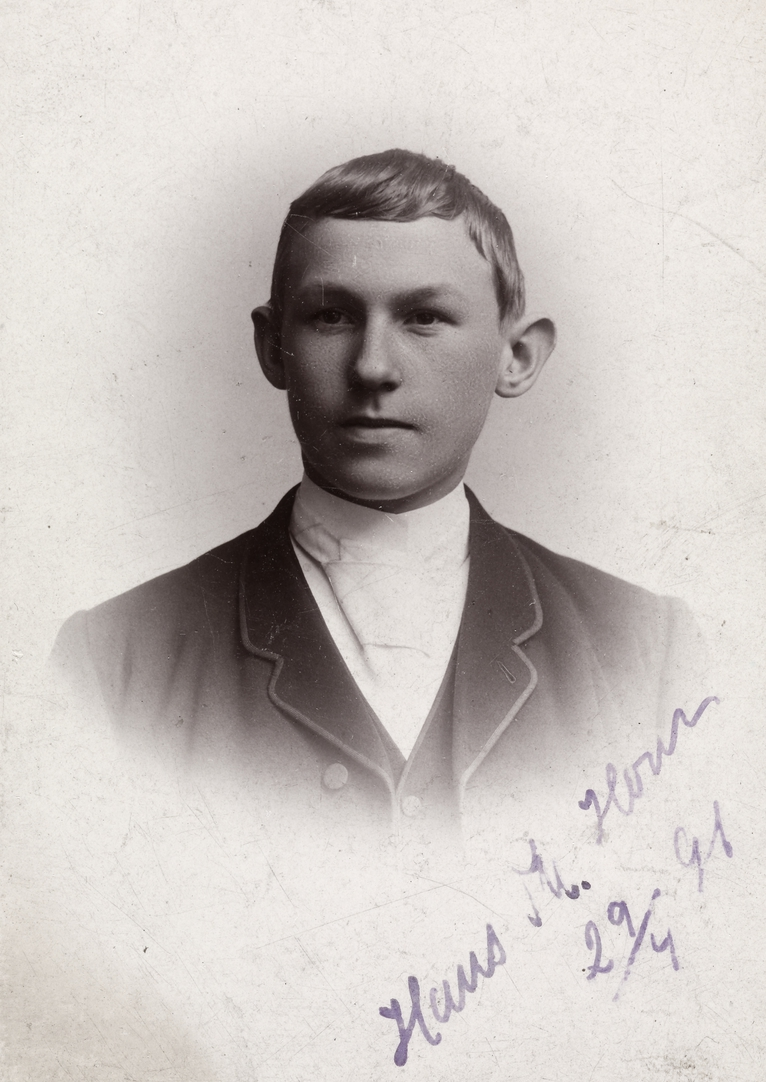
Hans Thomas Portrait

Hans Thomas "Hassa" Horn (2 October 1873 – 21 April 1968) was a Norwegian road engineer, industrialist, sports official and politician for the Conservative Party.

== Personal life ==
He was born in Christiania as a son of civil servant Hassa Horn Sr. (1837–1921) and Alette Gram (1844–1933). In 1905 he married Helga Birch-Reichenwald (1882–1909), a daughter of Peter Birch-Reichenwald. After her death he married anew, in 1910 to Sigrid Steen (1883–1956), a daughter of Johan Steen and sister of Erling Steen. Through his older sister Dorothea, Hassa Horn was an uncle of national housewives' leader Alette Nicolaysen.

== Career ==
He graduated in engineering from Kristiania Technical School in 1893, and studied at the Dresden College of Engineering from 1895 to 1897. He was then hired in the Norwegian Public Roads Administration in Nordland, with transfers to the Norwegian Directorate of Public Roads in 1901 and road planning in the Faroe Islands in 1903. He was hired as chief of the Public Roads Directorate executive office in 1905, and remained so until 1918. He then had a stint as construction chief for Electric Furnace Prod. Co. in Sauda until 1921.

Horn was a Nordic combined skier in his youth, with a specialty in ski jumping. He represented the club SK Skuld. He became chairman of the Association for the Promotion of Skiing from 1908, and remained so until 1912. In 1910 he was a participant in the splintering of Norwegian sports organizations, as the new Norges Riksforbund for Idræt (Confederation of Sports), which favored modern competitive sports, broke away from Centralforeningen which favored military sports and exercise. Horn also chaired the Norwegian Ski Federation (1914–1918) and the Norwegian Lawn Tennis Federation, and from 1908 to 1918 he also served as secretary of the Norwegian Trekking Association from 1908 to 1918, and edited its yearbook. He shared the Holmenkollen medal in 1918 with Jørgen Hansen.

Together with the editor of the yearbook of the Association for the Promotion of Skiing, Kristian Vilhelm Amundsen, Horn was also a Norwegian delegate to the International Ski Commission. He chaired it from 1914 to 1924, but just ahead of the 1924 Winter Olympics, where he would have led the Norwegian squad and also been present at the foundation of the International Ski Federation, he withdrew. The reason was a fallout between the skier Thoralf Strømstad and the board of the Association for the Promotion of Skiing. The Association tried to bar Strømstad's Olympic participation, but was overruled in this matter by the Confederation of Sports. Thus, Horn and Amundsen withdrew from both the Olympic preparations and from international skiing governance.

As a politician, Horn was elected as a deputy representative to the Parliament of Norway in 1912. The running mate of Nils Yngvar Ustvedt in the constituency Uranienborg, they carried 8,543 votes and won in a landslide as the closest challenger only had 1,544. In 1915 Horn was the running mate of Jens Bratlie, winning with an even larger margin; 12,960 votes against 1,888 for the closest challenger. From 1916 to 1918 Horn served one term in Kristiania city council. He was also vice president of the Norwegian Engineer Association and president from 1915 to 1919, having also co-founded the sub-group for road engineers.

From 1921 to 1929 he served as the director-general of Kristiania Gas- og Elektricitetsverker. He resigned in protest after the government disapproved of Oslo Municipality's purchase of Kykkelsrud, which Horn had orchestrated through a narrow approval in Oslo city council. From 1929 to 1943, Horn was the director-general of Norsk Zinkkompani. From 1931 Horn was a board member of the employers' association Elektrokjemisk arbeidsgiverforening, from 1934 he was a board member in the Federation of Norwegian Industries, serving as president from 1939 to 1942. Together with managing director Lorentz Vogt, he became known for a cooperative stance towards the Nazi authorities during the occupation of Norway by Nazi Germany. Among others, Horn had declared his allegiance to Nazi Minister of the Interior Albert Viljam Hagelin on 24 October 1940, and the Federation declined to sign the protest of the 43 letter in May 1941; the signatories were later subject to a crackdown. Following an internal audit in the Federation of Norwegian Industries in the post-war years, Horn withdrew from all positions in the Federation.

Horn was a board member of Tyssefaldene, Bremanger Kraftselskap og Rujernsverk and the family company Steen & Strøm, and supervisory council member of Norsk Sprængstofindustri from 1924, Holmenkolbanen from 1925 and Bergens Privatbank from 1933.

He was decorated as a Knight of the Order of the Polar Star and received the Swedish Olympia Medal. He resided in Bærum after the war. He died in April 1968 in Oslo.

Preceded by Frimann Dahl	Chairman of the Association for the Promotion of Skiing; 1908–1912	Succeeded by O. T. Klingenberg
Preceded by	President of the Norwegian Engineer Association; 1915–1919	Succeeded by
Preceded by	President of the Federation of Norwegian Industries; 1939–1942	Succeeded by
