= Jørgen Hansen (skier) =

Norwegian Nordic skier (1885–1971)

Jørgen Hansen (died 1971) was a Norwegian Nordic skier who shared the Holmenkollen medal in 1918 with Hans Horn.
