= Film & Kino =

Interest organization for municipalities that own cinemas in Norway

- Formation: 1917
- Purpose: Interest group
- Headquarters: Filmens Hus
- Location: Oslo, Norway
- Coordinates: 59.9097°N 10.74572°E
- Members: 149 municipalities
- CEO: Lene Løken
- Main organ: board of directors
- Website: www.kino.no

Film & Kino is an interest organization for municipalities that own cinemas in Norway.

== History ==
It was established in 1917 under the name Kommunale Kinematografers Landsforbund (KKL), and was a national association of municipal-owned cinema companies. In Norway, as opposed to many other countries, municipal ownership gradually superseded private ownership in this field after 1912, and the establishment of KKL helped consolidate the municipal system through horizontal integration. Municipal companies had a market share of 20% in 1917, but this had risen significantly by 1919.

Film & Kino distributes a magazine of the same name, in circulation since 1916. It was originally named Norsk Filmblad. A distribution bureau, Kommunenes Filmcentral, was created in 1919. The next step was to support the establishment of a production company, and Norsk Film opened in 1935. In 1948, Statens Filmsentral was established for the production of educational and documentary films. In that same year, the company Norwegian Mobile Cinema (Norsk Bygdekino) was founded. Its purpose was to bring culture to rural districts without a cinema, similar to the mobile theatre Riksteatret, which was established in 1947. KKL was one of many shareholders in the Mobile Cinema, together with the state, Kommunenes Filmcentral, the liberal movement's Noregs Ungdomslag, the labour movement's Arbeidernes Opplysningsforbund, and more. The Mobile Cinema faced tough competition from television in the post-World War II period, and was incorporated by Statens Filmsentral in 1969. Statens Filmsentral was merged into the Norwegian Film Institute (established in 1956 with archive purposes) in 1993, and KKL took over the Mobile Cinema.

KKL changed its name to Film & Kino (sometimes written FILM&KINO) in 1998. Tasks of today, in addition to the mobile cinema, include support for film distribution, imports, and publicity. It awards the Aamot Statuette and co-organizes the Norwegian International Film Festival in Haugesund. Its member body consists of 149 municipalities with cinemas. The CEO since 1993 is Lene Løken, and its board of directors consists of Bjørg Wallevik (chair), Geirmund Lykke (deputy chair), Synnøve Brenden Klemetrud, Knut Even Lindsjørn, Britt Skinstad Nordlund, Geir Martin Jensen, Roar Skovli, and Håkon Skogrand. The last three represent the film industry and cinemas, whereas the others are politicians.
