= Henriette Schønberg Erken =

Norwegian food writer and teacher (1866–1953)

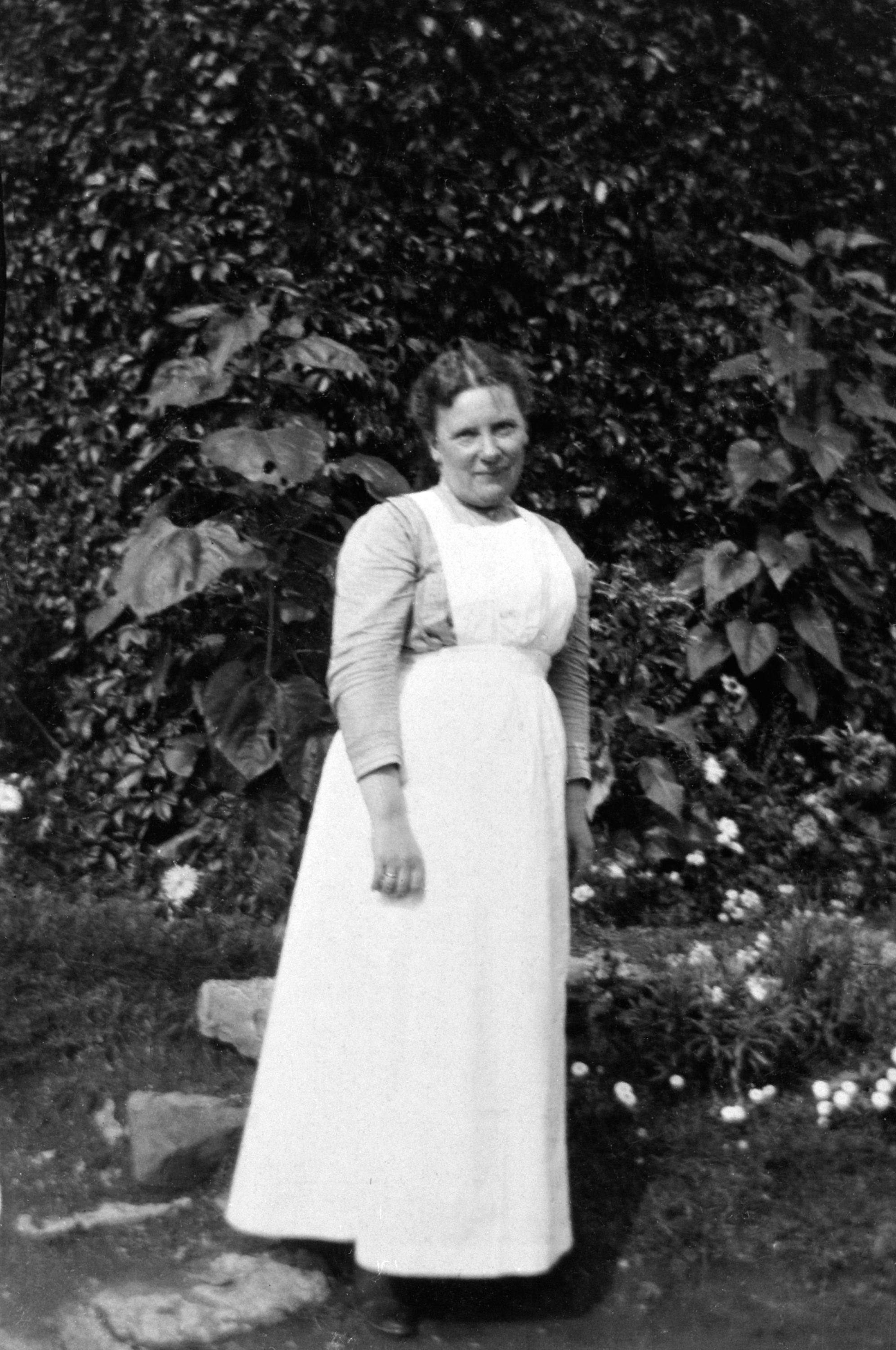

Maren Caroline Henriette Schønberg Erken (6 November 1866 – 22 October 1953) was a Norwegian cookbook writer and teacher of home economics. A Norwegian newspaper included her in its list of the 100 most important Norwegians of the last 200 years.

== Early life, education and career in home economics ==
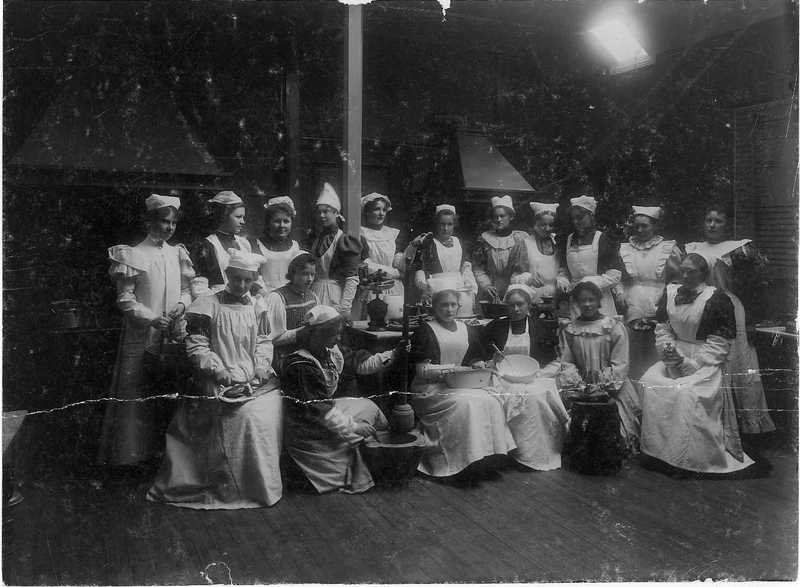
Henriette Schønberg Erken's home economics school in Homansbyen, Oslo. C. 1905

Erken was born Schønberg in Christiania (now Oslo). Her father, Edvard Schønberg, was a professor of medicine who emphasized the importance of food. Her mother was an accomplished cook from whom Henriette first learned to prepare food.

Erken obtained a teaching position at a girls' school in 1893. To improve her qualifications, she took courses in home economics in Norway and later studied cookery in Berlin and Edinburgh. Beginning in 1897, she wrote a regular column for the women's magazine Urd, which primarily reached readers of upper-class or upper middle-class backgrounds.

She married Albert Erken, an officer, in 1901. After living in Levanger in central Norway from 1904 to 1905, where Henriette organized home economics courses, they settled on a farm in Vang Municipality in eastern Norway. There, Henriette began offering home economics education. She provided courses for future housewives (Norwegian: husmorskole) and a school for aspiring home economics teachers. She also gave lectures and demonstrations across the country, which she continued after closing her educational programs in 1927. Her presentations often focused on preparing food using inexpensive Norwegian products like milk and fish. She also advocated for whale meat and horse meat, although the latter suggestion gained little traction.

== Publications ==
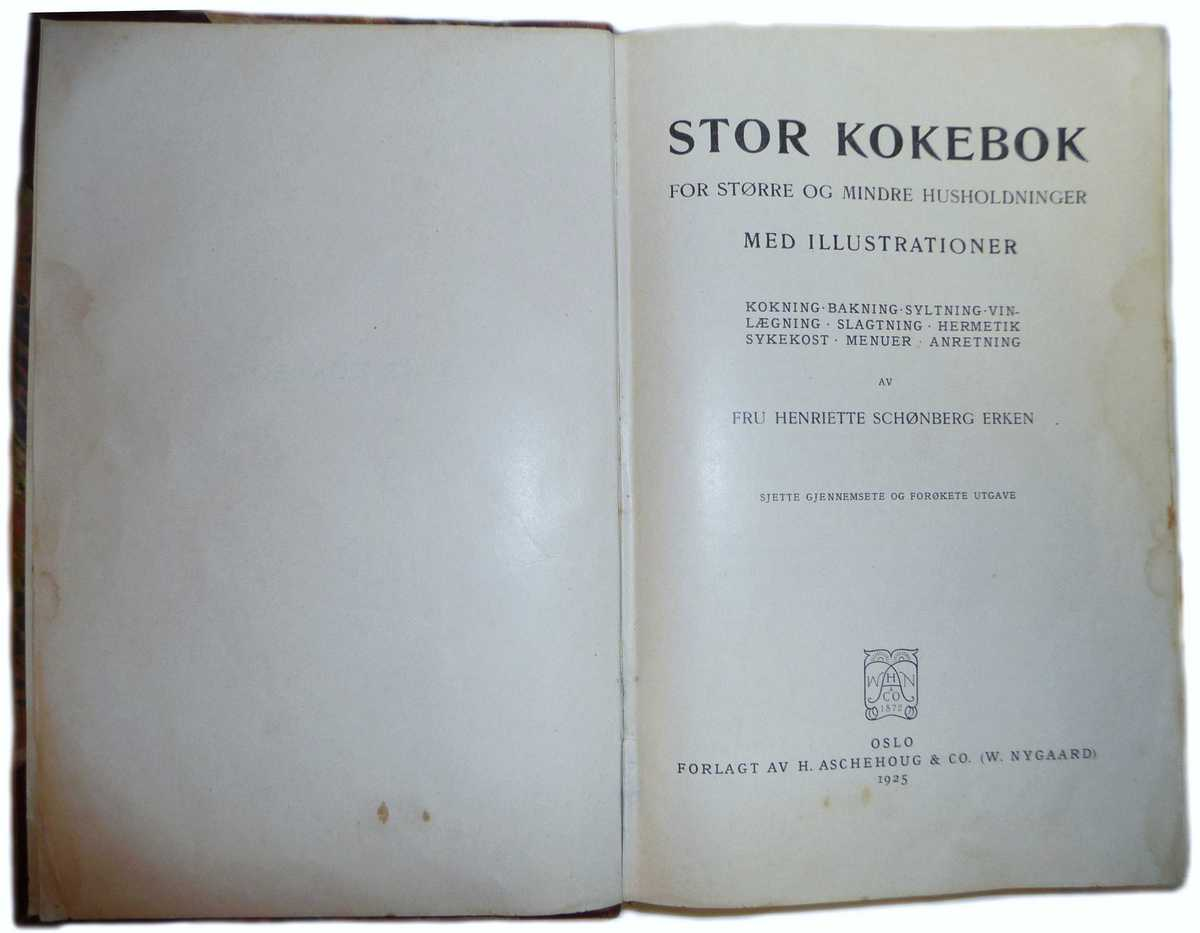
Stor Kokebok (Large Cookbook)

Her first cookbook, co-authored with Caroline Steen Kogebog for skole og hjem, was published in 1895. Steen was a physician from Denmark who was prevented from practicing medicine in her home country due to her gender. Their book went through sixteen editions. Steen later became a professor of domestic science in Denmark.

Erken's book Stor Kokebok (English: Big Cookbook) was first published in 1914. The book had 700 pages and saw 18 new editions until 1951. In total, it sold more than 200,000 copies. The same year, she published a small booklet called Billig mat (Cheap food). An abridged version of the large book, named Liten kokebok (English: Small cookbook) and first published in 1931, sold 100,000 copies.

Erken contributed recipes to physician Carl Schiøtz's 1939 book on healthy diet, Trygg kost for norske hjem, which included information about the Oslo breakfast.

== Awards and legacy ==
Erken was awarded the King's Medal of Merit in gold in 1916.

The biography Henriette Schønberg Erken. En norgeshistorie sett fra kjøkkenbenken (English: Henriette Schønberg Erken. A history of Norway seen from the kitchen table) by Maria Berg Reinertsen was published in 2013.

While her big cookbook was promoted as being based on recipes developed in Erken's kitchen, food columnist and chef Andreas Viestad has speculated that parts of her books were copied from foreign cookbooks. As an example, he cites her comprehensive instructions on how to kill and prepare a turtle for soup, questioning whether live turtles existed in Norway at that time.

In connection with the bicentenary of the Norwegian Constitution in 2014, a group of professionals assembled by the newspaper VG named Erken the 99th most important person in Norwegian history in the period 1814–2014.
