= Zavera Snowfield =

Glacier in Antarctica

- Location within Antarctica
- Location: Trinity Peninsula
- Coordinates: 64°06′30″S 58°52′00″W
- Length: 10 nmi (19 km; 12 mi)
- Thickness: unknown
- Terminus: Prince Gustav Channel
- Status: unknown

Zavera Snowfield (Bulgarian: Ледник Завера, 64°06′30″S 58°52′00″W) is the glacier extending 18 kilometres (11 mi) in a north-south direction and 16 kilometres (9.9 mi) in an east-west direction on southern Trinity Peninsula in Graham Land, Antarctica. It is located in the northeast foothills of Detroit Plateau, south of Diplock Glacier, north of Mount Wild and northeast of Kopito Ridge. It drains into Prince Gustav Channel in Weddell Sea. The glacier is named after the Bulgarian liberation uprising of ‘Velchova Zavera’ in 1835.

== Features ==
Features and nearby features include, from west to east:

=== Kopito Ridge ===
64°08′14″S 59°05′07″W. A mostly ice-free ridge in the southeast foothills of Detroit Plateau, which is bounded by Boydell Glacier to the west and Zavera Snowfield to the east. Extending 6 kilometres (3.7 mi) in northwest–southeast direction and 2.7 kilometres (1.7 mi) wide. The ridge rises to 1,014 metres (3,327 ft) high in its northwest part which is linked to Detroit Plateau east of Lobosh Peak. Named after the peaks of Golyamo (Great) Kopito and Malko (Little) Kopito in Vitosha Mountain, Western Bulgaria.

=== Huma Nunatak ===
64°06′48″S 59°00′19″W. A rocky hill rising to 776 metres (2,546 ft) high in the northeast foothills of Detroit Plateau. Situated in the west part of Zavera Snowfield, 2.73 kilometres (1.70 mi) south of Petkov Nunatak, 13.18 kilometres (8.19 mi) northwest of Mount Wild, 4.64 kilometres (2.88 mi) east-northeast of the summit of Kopito Ridge and 6.69 kilometres (4.16 mi) east-southeast of Lobosh Peak. Named after the settlement of Huma in Northeastern Bulgaria.

=== Petkov Nunatak ===
64°05′21″S 58°59′43″W. A rocky hill rising to 905 metres (2,969 ft) high in the northeast foothills of Detroit Plateau. Situated in the west part of Zavera Snowfield, 6.9 kilometres (4.3 mi) southwest of Rayko Nunatak, 15.32 kilometres (9.52 mi) north-northwest of Mount Wild, 2.73 kilometres (1.70 mi) north of Huma Nunatak and 7.11 kilometres (4.42 mi) east by north of Lobosh Peak. Named after Nikola Petkov (b. 1951), geologist at St. Kliment Ohridski base in 1995/96 and subsequent seasons, and program organizer of the Bulgarian Antarctic Institute.

=== Rayko Nunatak ===
64°02′15″S 58°55′02″W. A rocky hill rising to 783 metres (2,569 ft) high in the northeast foothills of Detroit Plateau. Situated on the south side of Diplock Glacier, 6.67 kilometres (4.14 mi) south-southeast of Povien Peak, 2.3 kilometres (1.4 mi) south of Bezenšek Spur, 6.04 kilometres (3.75 mi) southwest of Mount Roberts and 6.9 kilometres (4.3 mi) northeast of Petkov Nunatak. Surmounting Diplock Glacier to the north and Zavera Snowfield to the southeast. Named after the Bulgarian poet Rayko Zhinzifov (1839-1877).

=== Gredaro Point ===
64°06′00″S 58°42′03″W. A round and low, mostly ice-covered point on the southeast coast of Trinity Peninsula projecting into Prince Gustav Channel in Weddell Sea. Situated at the east extremity of Zavera Snowfield, 21.6 kilometres (13.4 mi) south-southwest of Marmais Point, 12.4 kilometres (7.7 mi) west-northwest of Cape Obelisk on James Ross Island, and 14.3 kilometres (8.9 mi) north-northeast of Mount Wild. British mapping in 1974. Named after Gredaro Peak in Pirin Mountain, Bulgaria.

=== Diplock Glacier ===
64°03′S 58°50′W. A narrow straight glacier, 10 nautical miles (19 km; 12 mi) long, flowing eastward from Detroit Plateau into Prince Gustav Channel 5 nautical miles (9.3 km; 5.8 mi) south of Alectoria Island. Mapped from surveys by th Falkland Islands Dependencies Survey (FIDS) (1960-61). Named by the UK Antarctic Place-Names Committee (UK-APC) for Bramah Joseph Diplock, British engineer who made considerable advances in the design of chain-track tractors (1885-1913).

== Sources ==
- Alberts, Fred G., ed. (1995), Geographic Names of the Antarctic (PDF) (2 ed.), United States Board on Geographic Names This article incorporates public domain material from websites or documents of the United States Board on Geographic Names.

REMA Explorer
The Reference Elevation Model of Antarctica (REMA) gives ice surface measurements of most of the continent. When a feature is ice-covered, the ice surface will differ from the underlying rock surface and will change over time. To see ice surface contours and elevation of a feature as of the last REMA update,
- Open the Antarctic REMA Explorer
- Enter the feature's coordinates in the box at the top left that says "Find address or place", then press enter
  The coordinates should be in DMS format, e.g. 65°05'03"S 64°01'02"W. If you only have degrees and minutes, you may not be able to locate the feature.
- Hover over the icons at the left of the screen
- Find "Hillshade" and click on that
  In the bottom right of the screen, set "Shading Factor" to 0 to get a clearer image
- Find "Contour" and click on that
  In the "Contour properties" box, select Contour Interval = 1m
  You can zoom in and out to see the ice surface contours of the feature and nearby features
- Find "Identify" and click on that
  Click the point where the contour lines seem to indicate the top of the feature
  The "Identify" box will appear to the top left. The Orthometric height is the elevation of the ice surface of the feature at this point.

- Antarctic REMA Explorer (Digital Elevation Models created by the Polar Geospatial Center from Maxar imagery), Polar Geospatial Center, University of Minnesota, 2019
- "Gredaro Point", Composite Gazetteer of Antarctica, Scientific Committee on Antarctic Research
- "Huma Nunatak", Composite Gazetteer of Antarctica, Scientific Committee on Antarctic Research
- "Kopito Ridge", Composite Gazetteer of Antarctica, Scientific Committee on Antarctic Research
- "Petkov Nunatak", Composite Gazetteer of Antarctica, Scientific Committee on Antarctic Research
- "Rayko Nunatak", Composite Gazetteer of Antarctica, Scientific Committee on Antarctic Research
- "Zavera Snowfield", Composite Gazetteer of Antarctica, Scientific Committee on Antarctic Research

This article includes information from the Antarctic Place-names Commission of Bulgaria which is used with permission.
