= Kondofrey Heights =

Mountains in Antarctica

- Massif
- Location within Antarctica
- Coordinates: 63°50′00″S 58°34′00″W
- Location: Trinity Peninsula, Graham Land

The Kondofrey Heights (63°50′00″S 58°34′00″W) are heights that rise to 1,115 metres (3,658 ft) at Skakavitsa Peak, on the southeast side of the Trinity Peninsula, Antarctic Peninsula.

== Location ==
Trinity Peninsula, Antarctic Peninsula. Kondofrey Heights in center of southeast coast

The Kondofrey Heights are in Graham Land on the southeast coast of the Trinity Peninsula, which forms the tip of the Antarctic Peninsula. They are situated east of Detroit Plateau, south of Victory Glacier and west of Prince Gustav Channel, Weddell Sea. They are linked to Detroit Plateau by Podgumer Col. They extend 9.2 kilometres (5.7 mi) from east to west 7.5 kilometres (4.7 mi) from north to south.

For an adjusted Copernix satellite image, see Kondofrey Heights.

== Name ==
The Kondofrey Heights are named after the settlement of Kondofrey in western Bulgaria.

== Nearby features ==
Nearby features include, from west to east:

=== Podgumer Col ===
63°49′32″S 58°38′34″W. A mostly ice-free col of elevation over 800 metres (2,600 ft) high linking Kondofrey Heights to the east to Detroit Plateau to the west. Situated 1.03 kilometres (0.64 mi) west-northwest of Gurgulyat Peak, 6.6 kilometres (4.1 mi) north by west of Mount Bradley and 10 kilometres (6.2 mi) south by west of Zlidol Gate. Surmounting the upper course of Victory Glacier to the N, and a tributary to Znepole Ice Piedmont to the south. Named after the settlement of Podgumer in Western Bulgaria.

=== Gurgulyat Peak ===
63°49′42″S 58°37′22″W. A peak rising to 1,050 metres (3,440 ft) high in Kondofrey Heights. Situated 2.08 kilometres (1.29 mi) southwest of Skakavitsa Peak, 4 kilometres (2.5 mi) west by north of Mount Reece, and 10.6 kilometres (6.6 mi) south of Mount Schuyler. Surmounting Victory Glacier to the north. Named after the settlement of Gurgulyat in Western Bulgaria.

=== Vinogradi Peak ===
63°50′12″S 58°36′54″W. A peak rising to 1,033 metres (3,389 ft) high in Kondofrey Heights. Situated 1 kilometre (0.62 mi) south of Gurgulyat Peak, 3.65 kilometres (2.27 mi) west-southwest of Mount Reece and 5.2 kilometres (3.2 mi) north of Mount Bradley. Named after the settlement of Vinogradi in Southwestern Bulgaria.

=== Yoglav Crag ===
63°51′21″S 58°35′52″W. A rocky peak rising to 861 metres (2,825 ft) high in the south extremity of Kondofrey Heights. Situated 2.3 kilometres (1.4 mi) south-southeast of Vinogradi Peak, 3.75 kilometres (2.33 mi) southwest of Mount Reece, 8.48 kilometres (5.27 mi) west-northwest of Kiten Point and 3.5 kilometres (2.2 mi) north-northeast of Mount Bradley. Surmounting Znepole Ice Piedmont to the southeast. Named after the settlement of Yoglav in Northern Bulgaria.

=== Skakavitsa Peak ===
63°48′58″S 58°35′27″W. A peak rising to 1,115 metres (3,658 ft) high in Kondofrey Heights. Situated 9.93 kilometres (6.17 mi) south-southeast of Mount Schuyler, 8.94 kilometres (5.56 mi) southwest of Mount Daimler and 3 kilometres (1.9 mi) northwest of Mount Reece. Surmounting Victory Glacier to the north and east. Named after Skakavitsa Nature Reserve in Rila Mountain, Bulgaria.

=== Bezbog Peak ===
63°48′35″S 58°34′08″W. A rocky peak rising to 963 metres (3,159 ft) high in the north extremity of Kondofrey Heights. Situated 2.88 kilometres (1.79 mi) north-northwest of Mount Reece, 1.29 kilometres (0.80 mi) northeast of Skakavitsa Peak, 6.89 kilometres (4.28 mi) southeast of Skoparnik Bluff and 5.39 kilometres (3.35 mi) south-southwest of Bozveli Peak. Surmounting Victory Glacier to the north and east. Named after Bezbog Peak in Pirin mountain, Southwestern Bulgaria.

=== Mount Reece ===
63°50′S 58°32′W. Sharp, ice-free peak, 1,085 metres (3,560 ft) high, standing 4 nautical miles (7.4 km; 4.6 mi) west of Pitt Point. It is the highest point of a ridge forming the south wall of Victory Glacier on the south side of Trinity Peninsula. Charted in 1945 by the Falkland Islands Dependencies Survey (FIDS) and named for Alan Reece, leader of the FIDS Deception Island base in 1945, and meteorologist and geologist at the Hope Bay base in 1946. Reece, a member of the NBSAE, 1949-52, was killed in an airplane accident in the Canadian Arctic in 1960.

=== Negovan Crag ===
63°49′56″S 58°29′40″W. A peak rising to 746 metres (2,448 ft) high in Kondofrey Heights on Trinity Peninsula, Antarctic Peninsula. Situated 2.3 kilometres (1.4 mi) east of Mount Reece, 9.48 kilometres (5.89 mi) south of Mount Daimler, 8.6 kilometres (5.3 mi) northeast of Mount Bradley and 5.55 kilometres (3.45 mi) west-northwest of Pitt Point. Surmounting Victory Glacier to the north and Chudomir Cove to the SE. Named after the settlement of Negovan in Western Bulgaria.

== Sources ==
- Alberts, Fred G., ed. (1995), Geographic Names of the Antarctic (PDF) (2 ed.), United States Board on Geographic Names This article incorporates public domain material from websites or documents of the United States Board on Geographic Names.

REMA Explorer
The Reference Elevation Model of Antarctica (REMA) gives ice surface measurements of most of the continent. When a feature is ice-covered, the ice surface will differ from the underlying rock surface and will change over time. To see ice surface contours and elevation of a feature as of the last REMA update,
- Open the Antarctic REMA Explorer
- Enter the feature's coordinates in the box at the top left that says "Find address or place", then press enter
  The coordinates should be in DMS format, e.g. 65°05'03"S 64°01'02"W. If you only have degrees and minutes, you may not be able to locate the feature.
- Hover over the icons at the left of the screen
- Find "Hillshade" and click on that
  In the bottom right of the screen, set "Shading Factor" to 0 to get a clearer image
- Find "Contour" and click on that
  In the "Contour properties" box, select Contour Interval = 1m
  You can zoom in and out to see the ice surface contours of the feature and nearby features
- Find "Identify" and click on that
  Click the point where the contour lines seem to indicate the top of the feature
  The "Identify" box will appear to the top left. The Orthometric height is the elevation of the ice surface of the feature at this point.

- Antarctic REMA Explorer (Digital Elevation Models created by the Polar Geospatial Center from Maxar imagery), Polar Geospatial Center. University of Minnesota, 2019
- "Bezbog Peak", Composite Gazetteer of Antarctica, Scientific Committee on Antarctic Research
- Graham Land and South Shetland Islands, BAS: British Antarctic Survey, 2005
- "Gurgulyat Peak", Composite Gazetteer of Antarctica, Scientific Committee on Antarctic Research
- "Kondofrey Heights", Composite Gazetteer of Antarctica, Scientific Committee on Antarctic Research
- "Negovan Crag", Composite Gazetteer of Antarctica, Scientific Committee on Antarctic Research
- "Podgumer Col", Composite Gazetteer of Antarctica, Scientific Committee on Antarctic Research
- "Skakavitsa Peak", Composite Gazetteer of Antarctica, Scientific Committee on Antarctic Research
- Trinity Peninsula (PDF) (Scale 1:250000 topographic map No. 5697), Institut für Angewandte Geodäsie and British Antarctic Survey, 1996, archived from the original (PDF) on 23 September 2015
- "Vinogradi Peak", Composite Gazetteer of Antarctica, Scientific Committee on Antarctic Research
- "Yoglav Crag", Composite Gazetteer of Antarctica, Scientific Committee on Antarctic Research

This article incorporates public domain material from websites or documents of the United States Geological Survey.

This article includes information from the Antarctic Place-names Commission of Bulgaria which is used with permission.
