= Znepole Ice Piedmont =

Glacier on Trinity Peninsula, Antarctica

- Location within Antarctica
- Location: Trinity Peninsula
- Coordinates: 63°52′30″S 58°33′20″W
- Terminus: Prince Gustav Channel

Znepole Ice Piedmont (63°52′30″S 58°33′20″W) is the glacier extending 13 kilometres (8.1 mi) in northwest-southeast direction and 7.5 kilometres (4.7 mi) wide on Trinity Peninsula in Graham Land, Antarctica.

== Location ==
Trinity Peninsula, Antarctic Peninsula. Victory Glacier in center of southeast coast

Znepole Ice Piedmont is in Graham Land on the southeast coast of the Trinity Peninsula, which forms the tip of the Antarctic Peninsula. It lies south of Victory Glacier and northeast of Dreatin Glacier, and is bounded by Kondofrey Heights to the north and the 5.2 kilometres (3.2 mi) long narrow rocky ridge featuring Mount Bradley to the west, flowing southeastwards into Prince Gustav Channel, Weddell Sea.

== Name ==
Znepole Ice Piedmont is named after the Znepole region in Western Bulgaria.

== Nearby features ==
=== Kiten Point ===
63°52′55″S 58°26′08″W A point forming the south side of the entrance to Chudomir Cove on the coast of Prince Gustav Channel. Situated 4.3 kilometres (2.7 mi) southwest of Pitt Point and7.56 kilometres (4.70 mi) southeast of Mount Reece. Named after the town of Kiten in Southeastern Bulgaria, and in connection with the freezer vessel Kiten of the Bulgarian company Ocean Fisheries – Burgas whose ships operated in the waters of South Georgia, Kerguelen, the South Orkney Islands, South Shetland Islands and Antarctic Peninsula from 1970 to the early 1990s. The Bulgarian fishermen, along with those of the Soviet Union, Poland and East Germany are the pioneers of modern Antarctic fishing industry.

=== Marmais Point ===
63°55′22″S 58°31′25″W The ice-covered point on the southeast coast of Trinity Peninsula projecting into Prince Gustav Channel. Situated 6.3 kilometres (3.9 mi) southwest of Kiten Point, 21.6 kilometres (13.4 mi) north-northeast of Gredaro Point, and 6.65 kilometres (4.13 mi) southeast of Mount Bradley. German-British mapping in 1996. Named after the Bulgarian duke and military commander Marmais (9th-10th century).

=== Mount Bradley ===
63°53′S 58°37′W. A pyramidal peak 835 metres (2,740 ft) high at the southeast end of a ridge descending from Detroit Plateau. The peak is 4 nautical miles (7.4 km; 4.6 mi) southwest of Mount Reece . Charted in 1945 by the Falkland Islands Dependencies Survey (FIDS), who named it for Kenneth Granville Bradley, Colonial Secretary in the Falkland Islands at the time.

=== Senokos Nunatak ===
63°53′08″S 58°41′41″W The rocky hill rising to 624 metres (2,047 ft) high in Dreatin Glacier. Situated in the northeast foothills of Detroit Plateau, 3.27 kilometres (2.03 mi) west of Mount Bradley and 4.6 kilometres (2.9 mi) north of Tufft Nunatak. Named after the settlements of Senokos, Dobrich Province and Senokos, Blagoevgrad Province in Northeastern and Southwestern Bulgaria.

=== Dreatin Glacier ===
63°54′00″S 58°41′00″W A 12 kilometres (7.5 mi) long and 7.5 kilometres (4.7 mi) wide glacier on the northeast side of Detroit Plateau. Situated southwest of Znepole Ice Piedmont and north of Aitkenhead Glacier. Draining the area southwest of Mount Bradley and north of Tufft Nunatak, and flowing southeastwards into Prince Gustav Channel. Named after the settlement of Dreatin in Western Bulgaria.

== Sources ==
- Alberts, Fred G., ed. (1995), Geographic Names of the Antarctic (PDF) (2 ed.), United States Board on Geographic Names This article incorporates public domain material from websites or documents of the United States Board on Geographic Names.

REMA Explorer
The Reference Elevation Model of Antarctica (REMA) gives ice surface measurements of most of the continent. When a feature is ice-covered, the ice surface will differ from the underlying rock surface and will change over time. To see ice surface contours and elevation of a feature as of the last REMA update,
- Open the Antarctic REMA Explorer
- Enter the feature's coordinates in the box at the top left that says "Find address or place", then press enter
  The coordinates should be in DMS format, e.g. 65°05'03"S 64°01'02"W. If you only have degrees and minutes, you may not be able to locate the feature.
- Hover over the icons at the left of the screen
- Find "Hillshade" and click on that
  In the bottom right of the screen, set "Shading Factor" to 0 to get a clearer image
- Find "Contour" and click on that
  In the "Contour properties" box, select Contour Interval = 1m
  You can zoom in and out to see the ice surface contours of the feature and nearby features
- Find "Identify" and click on that
  Click the point where the contour lines seem to indicate the top of the feature
  The "Identify" box will appear to the top left. The Orthometric height is the elevation of the ice surface of the feature at this point.

- Antarctic REMA Explorer (Digital Elevation Models created by the Polar Geospatial Center from Maxar imagery), Polar Geospatial Center, University of Minnesota, 2019
- "Dreatin Glacier", Composite Gazetteer of Antarctica, Scientific Committee on Antarctic Research
- Graham Land and South Shetland Islands, BAS: British Antarctic Survey, 2005
- "Kiten Point", Composite Gazetteer of Antarctica, Scientific Committee on Antarctic Research
- "Marmais Point", Composite Gazetteer of Antarctica, Scientific Committee on Antarctic Research
- "Senokos Nunatak", Composite Gazetteer of Antarctica, Scientific Committee on Antarctic Research
- Trinity Peninsula (PDF) (Scale 1:250000 topographic map No. 5697), Institut für Angewandte Geodäsie and British Antarctic Survey, 1996, archived from the original (PDF) on 23 September 2015
- "Znepole Ice Piedmont", Composite Gazetteer of Antarctica, Scientific Committee on Antarctic Research

This article incorporates public domain material from websites or documents of the United States Geological Survey.

This article includes information from the Antarctic Place-names Commission of Bulgaria which is used with permission.
