= Victory Glacier =

Glacier in Antarctica

- Location within Antarctica
- Location: Trinity Peninsula
- Coordinates: 63°49′S 58°25′W
- Length: 8 nautical miles (15 km; 9.2 mi)
- Terminus: Prince Gustav Channel

Victory Glacier (63°49′S 58°25′W) is a gently sloping glacier, 8 nautical miles (15 km; 9.2 mi) long, flowing east-southeast from the north end of Detroit Plateau on Trinity Peninsula to Prince Gustav Channel immediately north of Pitt Point. It is bounded by Trakiya Heights to the north and Kondofrey Heights to the south.

== Location ==
Trinity Peninsula, Antarctic Peninsula. Victory Glacier in center of southeast coast

Victory Glacier is in Graham Land on the southeast coast of the Trinity Peninsula, which forms the tip of the Antarctic Peninsula. The north end of the Detroit Plateau rises above the head of the glacier. It flows east and terminates in Prince Gustav Channel. It is southwest of Russell East Glacier and northeast of Aitkenhead Glacier. Nearby features include Mount Daimler to the north, Mount Reece to the south and Pitt Point at the south end of the glacier's mouth.

== Mapping and name ==
Victory Glacier was surveyed by the Falkland Islands Dependencies Survey (FIDS), and so named because the glacier was sighted in the week following the surrender of Japan in World War II, in August 1945.

== Nearby features ==
Nearby features include, from northwest to southeast:

=== Mount Schuyler ===
63°44′14″S 58°41′05″W. A peak rising to 1,475 metres (4,839 ft) high off the northeast extremity of Detroit Plateau. Situated 2.28 kilometres (1.42 mi) south-southwest of Sirius Knoll, 4.45 kilometres (2.77 mi) west of Antonov Peak, 9.35 kilometres (5.81 mi) west by north of Mount Daimler and 12.75 kilometres (7.92 mi) north-northwest of Mount Reece. Surmounting Russell West Glacier to the north and Victory Glacier to the south. Named after the American diplomat Eugene Schuyler (1840-1890) who investigated the crushing of the Bulgarian Uprising of 1876 and co-authored the draft decisions of the subsequent 1876 Constantinople Conference.

=== Lepitsa Peak ===
63°44′30″S 58°38′29″W. An ice-covered peak rising to 1,110 metres (3,640 ft) high in the northeast foothills of Detroit Plateau. Situated on the west side of Zlidol Gate, 2.19 kilometres (1.36 mi) east-southeast of Mount Schuyler, 2.88 kilometres (1.79 mi) south-southeast of Sirius Knoll, 1.49 kilometres (0.93 mi) west-southwest of Belgun Peak and 5.75 kilometres (3.57 mi) northwest of Bozveli Peak in Trakiya Heights, and 3.42 kilometres (2.13 mi) north-northeast of Skoparnik Bluff. Surmounting the head of Russell West Glacier to the north and Victory Glacier to the SE. Named after the settlement of Lepitsa in Northern Bulgaria.

=== Skoparnik Bluff ===
63°46′08″S 58°40′26″W. A partly ice-free bluff rising to 882 metres (2,894 ft). Situated in the northeast foothills of Detroit Plateau, 3.56 kilometres (2.21 mi) south of Mount Schuyler, 4.88 kilometres (3.03 mi) southwest of Antonov Peak and 6.83 kilometres (4.24 mi) west of Bozveli Peak in Trakiya Heights, and 6.89 kilometres (4.28 mi) northwest of Bezbog Peak and 7.08 kilometres (4.40 mi) north-northwest of Gurgulyat Peak in Kondofrey Heights, and 11.52 kilometres (7.16 mi) east-northeast of Bendida Peak. Surmounting Victory Glacier to the southeast. Named after Skoparnik Peak on Vitosha Mountain in Western Bulgaria.

=== Kondofrey Heights ===
63°50′00″S 58°34′00″W. Heights rising to 1,119 metres (3,671 ft) high. Situated east of Detroit Plateau, south of Victory Glacier and west of Prince Gustav Channel. Extending 9.2 kilometres (5.7 mi) in an east–west direction and 7.5 kilometres (4.7 mi) in a north–south direction. Named after the settlement of Kondofrey in Western Bulgaria.

=== Pitt Point ===
63°51′S 58°22′W. A promontory, 90 metres (300 ft) high, at the south side of the mouth of Victory Glacier. Charted by the Falkland Islands Dependencies Survey (FIDS) in 1945, and named for K.A.J. Pitt, master of the Fitzroy, who assisted in establishing FIDS bases in 1944-45.

=== Chudomir Cove ===
63°51′30″S 58°26′00″W. A 4.3 kilometres (2.7 mi) wide cove indenting for 3.4 kilometres (2.1 mi) the southeast coast of Trinity Peninsula, south of Pitt Point and north of Kiten Point. Named after the Bulgarian writer Chudomir (Dimitar Chorbadzhiyski, 1890-1967).

== Sources ==
- Alberts, Fred G., ed. (1995), Geographic Names of the Antarctic (PDF) (2 ed.), United States Board on Geographic Names This article incorporates public domain material from websites or documents of the United States Board on Geographic Names.

REMA Explorer
The Reference Elevation Model of Antarctica (REMA) gives ice surface measurements of most of the continent. When a feature is ice-covered, the ice surface will differ from the underlying rock surface and will change over time. To see ice surface contours and elevation of a feature as of the last REMA update,
- Open the Antarctic REMA Explorer
- Enter the feature's coordinates in the box at the top left that says "Find address or place", then press enter
  The coordinates should be in DMS format, e.g. 65°05'03"S 64°01'02"W. If you only have degrees and minutes, you may not be able to locate the feature.
- Hover over the icons at the left of the screen
- Find "Hillshade" and click on that
  In the bottom right of the screen, set "Shading Factor" to 0 to get a clearer image
- Find "Contour" and click on that
  In the "Contour properties" box, select Contour Interval = 1m
  You can zoom in and out to see the ice surface contours of the feature and nearby features
- Find "Identify" and click on that
  Click the point where the contour lines seem to indicate the top of the feature
  The "Identify" box will appear to the top left. The Orthometric height is the elevation of the ice surface of the feature at this point.

- Antarctic REMA Explorer (Digital Elevation Models created by the Polar Geospatial Center from Maxar imagery), Polar Geospatial Center, University of Minnesota, 2019
- "Chudomir Cove", Composite Gazetteer of Antarctica, Scientific Committee on Antarctic Research
- Graham Land and South Shetland Islands, BAS: British Antarctic Survey, 2005
- "Kondofrey Heights", Composite Gazetteer of Antarctica, Scientific Committee on Antarctic Research
- "Lepitsa Peak", Composite Gazetteer of Antarctica, Scientific Committee on Antarctic Research
- "Mount Schuyler", Composite Gazetteer of Antarctica, Scientific Committee on Antarctic Research
- "Skoparnik Bluff", Composite Gazetteer of Antarctica, Scientific Committee on Antarctic Research
- Trinity Peninsula (PDF) (Scale 1:250000 topographic map No. 5697), Institut für Angewandte Geodäsie and British Antarctic Survey, 1996, archived from the original (PDF) on 23 September 2015

This article incorporates public domain material from websites or documents of the United States Geological Survey.
