= Trakiya Heights =

Mountains in Antarctica

- Massif
- Location within Antarctica
- Coordinates: 63°45′07″S 58°31′10″W
- Location: Trinity Peninsula, Graham Land

The Trakiya Heights (63°45′07″S 58°31′10″W) are heights that rise to 1,350 metres (4,430 ft) on Trinity Peninsula, Antarctic Peninsula, Antarctica.

== Location ==
Trinity Peninsula, Antarctic Peninsula. Trakiya Heights towards the west of the southeast coast

The Trakiya Heights are in Graham Land towards the west of the south coast of the Trinity Peninsula, which forms the tip of the Antarctic Peninsula. They are bounded by Russell West Glacier to the north, Russell East Glacier to the northeast, Victory Glacier to the southwest and Zlidol Gate to the northwest. They surmount Prince Gustav Channel, Weddell Sea to the southeast. The heights extend 10 kilometres (6.2 mi) in a northwest–southeast direction and 5.9 kilometres (3.7 mi) in a northeast–southwest direction.

== Mapping and name ==
A German-British mapping was undertaken in 1996. The Trakiya Heights are named after the historical region of Trakiya (Thrace).

== Features ==
Features, from west to east, include:

=== Belgun Peak ===
63°44′16″S 58°36′45″W. An ice-covered peak rising to 1,205 metres (3,953 ft) high in the northwest extremity of Trakiya Heights. Situated on the east side of Zlidol Gate, 890 metres (2,920 ft) northwest of Antonov Peak, 4.6 kilometres (2.9 mi) northeast of Skoparnik Bluff, 1.49 kilometres (0.93 mi) east-northeast of Lepitsa Peak, 3.56 kilometres (2.21 mi) east of Mount Schuyler on Detroit Plateau, 3.41 kilometres (2.12 mi) southeast of Sirius Knoll and 5.2 kilometres (3.2 mi) west-southwest of Mount Canicula. Precipitous, partly ice-free west slopes. Surmounting the head of Russell West Glacier to the north, and the upper course of Victory Glacier to the south. Named after the settlement of Belgun in Northeastern Bulgaria.

=== Antonov Peak ===
63°44′32″S 58°35′43″W. A peak rising to over 1,316 metres (4,318 ft) high in the northwest part of Trakiya Heights. Situated 4.45 kilometres (2.77 mi) east of Mount Schuyler, 4.25 kilometres (2.64 mi) southeast of Sirius Knoll, 4.9 kilometres (3.0 mi) west by north of Mount Daimler and 8.23 kilometres (5.11 mi) north of Skakavitsa Peak. Surmounting Russell West Glacier to the north and Victory Glacier to the S. Named after the Bulgarian automobile constructor Rumen Antonov (b. 1944) who invented an innovative automatic gearbox.

=== Irakli Peak ===
63°44′08″S 58°34′14″W. A peak rising to 1,350 metres (4,430 ft) high in the northwest part of Trakiya Heights. Situated 1.43 kilometres (0.89 mi) northeast of Antonov Peak, 3.24 kilometres (2.01 mi) southwest of Mount Canicula, 3.87 kilometres (2.40 mi) west-northwest of Mount Daimler and 3.56 kilometres (2.21 mi) north-northwest of Bozveli Peak. Surmounting Russell West Glacier to the north and Russell East Glacier to the east. Named after the nature site of Irakli on the Bulgarian Black Sea Coast.

=== Bozveli Peak ===
63°45′49″S 58°32′09″W. A peak rising to 1,251 metres (4,104 ft) high in Trakiya Heights on Trinity Peninsula, Antarctic Peninsula. Situated 3.78 kilometres (2.35 mi) southeast of Antonov Peak, 2.7 kilometres (1.7 mi) southwest of Mount Daimler and 6.45 kilometres (4.01 mi) north-northeast of Skakavitsa Peak. Surmounting Victory Glacier to the southwest. Named after the Bulgarian enlightener Neofit Bozveli (1785-1848), a leader in the struggle for the restoration of the autocephalous Bulgarian Church.

=== Utus Peak ===
63°45′23″S 58°29′10″W. A rocky peak rising to 1,206 metres (3,957 ft) high in Trakiya Heights. Situated 980 metres (3,220 ft) high south-southeast of Mount Daimler, 8.45 kilometres (5.25 mi) north of Negovan Crag and 2.58 kilometres (1.60 mi) east-northeast of Bozveli Peak. Named after the ancient Roman town of Utus in Northern Bulgaria.

=== Mount Daimler ===
63°45′S 58°29′W. The highest point of a rock massif between Russell East Glacier and Victory Glacier, 3 nautical miles (5.6 km; 3.5 mi) south of Mount Canicula. Mapped from surveys by FIDS (1960–61). Named by UK-APC for Gottlieb Daimler (1834–1900), German engineer who developed the light-oil medium speed internal combustion engine which made possible the first commercial production of light mechanical land transport, 1883–85.

=== Morava Peak ===
63°44′15″S 58°28′14″W. A peak rising to 953 metres (3,127 ft) high in the northeast extremity of Trakiya Heights. Situated 1.72 kilometres (1.07 mi) northeast of Mount Daimler, 4.94 kilometres (3.07 mi) east of Irakli Peak and 6.1 kilometres (3.8 mi) south-southwest of Gigen Peak. Surmounting Russell East Glacier to the north and east. Named after the settlement of Morava in Northern Bulgaria.

== Sources ==
- Alberts, Fred G., ed. (1995), Geographic Names of the Antarctic (PDF) (2 ed.), United States Board on Geographic Names This article incorporates public domain material from websites or documents of the United States Board on Geographic Names.

REMA Explorer
The Reference Elevation Model of Antarctica (REMA) gives ice surface measurements of most of the continent. When a feature is ice-covered, the ice surface will differ from the underlying rock surface and will change over time. To see ice surface contours and elevation of a feature as of the last REMA update,
- Open the Antarctic REMA Explorer
- Enter the feature's coordinates in the box at the top left that says "Find address or place", then press enter
  The coordinates should be in DMS format, e.g. 65°05'03"S 64°01'02"W. If you only have degrees and minutes, you may not be able to locate the feature.
- Hover over the icons at the left of the screen
- Find "Hillshade" and click on that
  In the bottom right of the screen, set "Shading Factor" to 0 to get a clearer image
- Find "Contour" and click on that
  In the "Contour properties" box, select Contour Interval = 1m
  You can zoom in and out to see the ice surface contours of the feature and nearby features
- Find "Identify" and click on that
  Click the point where the contour lines seem to indicate the top of the feature
  The "Identify" box will appear to the top left. The Orthometric height is the elevation of the ice surface of the feature at this point.

- Antarctic REMA Explorer (Digital Elevation Models created by the Polar Geospatial Center from Maxar imagery), Polar Geospatial Center, University of Minnesota, 2019
- "Antonov Peak", Composite Gazetteer of Antarctica, Scientific Committee on Antarctic Research
- "Belgun Peak", Composite Gazetteer of Antarctica, Scientific Committee on Antarctic Research
- "Bozveli Peak", Composite Gazetteer of Antarctica, Scientific Committee on Antarctic Research
- Graham Land and South Shetland Islands, BAS: British Antarctic Survey, 2005
- "Irakli Peak", Composite Gazetteer of Antarctica, Scientific Committee on Antarctic Research
- "Morava Peak", Composite Gazetteer of Antarctica, Scientific Committee on Antarctic Research
- "Trakiya Heights", Composite Gazetteer of Antarctica, Scientific Committee on Antarctic Research
- Trinity Peninsula (PDF) (Scale 1:250000 topographic map No. 5697), Institut für Angewandte Geodäsie and British Antarctic Survey, 1996, archived from the original (PDF) on 23 September 2015
- "Utus Peak", Composite Gazetteer of Antarctica, Scientific Committee on Antarctic Research

This article incorporates public domain material from websites or documents of the United States Geological Survey.

This article includes information from the Antarctic Place-names Commission of Bulgaria which is used with permission.
