= Erul Heights =

Mountains in Antarctica

- Massif
- Coordinates: 63°42′10″S 58°21′10″W
- Location: Trinity Peninsula, Graham Land

Erul Heights (63°42′10″S 58°21′10″W) is the heights rising to 1,083 metres (3,553 ft) at Gigen Peak, located on Trinity Peninsula in Graham Land, Antarctica.

== Location ==
Trinity Peninsula, Antarctic Peninsula. Trakiya Heights towards the west of the southeast coast

The Erul Heights are in Graham Land towards the west of the south coast of the Trinity Peninsula, which forms the tip of the Antarctic Peninsula. They are bounded by Russell East Glacier to the south and Cugnot Ice Piedmont to the north, extending 8 km from Benz Pass in east-southeast direction towards Smokinya Cove, and surmounting Prince Gustav Channel, Weddell Sea to the southeast.

Erul Heights. Copernix satellite image

== Mapping and name ==
A German-British mapping of the region was undertaken in 1996. The heights are named after the settlement of Erul in Western Bulgaria.

== Features ==
Named features, from west to east, include:

=== Gigen Peak ===
63°41′19″S 58°24′53″W. A peak rising to 1,083 metres (3,553 ft) high on the south side of Benz Pass. Situated 6.67 kilometres (4.14 mi) west-northwest of Panhard Nunatak. Surmounting Russell East Glacier to the west and south, and Cugnot Ice Piedmont to the east. Named after the settlement of Gigen in Northern Bulgaria.

=== Lopyan Crag ===
63°42′11″S 58°23′29″W. A narrow rocky hill extending 1.7 kilometres (1.1 mi) in northwest–southeast direction and rising to 523 metres (1,716 ft) high. Situated 1.98 kilometres (1.23 mi) southeast of Gigen Peak, 2.27 kilometres (1.41 mi) southwest of Coburg Peak, 4.96 kilometres (3.08 mi) west by north of Panhard Nunatak, 2.64 kilometres (1.64 mi) northeast of Siniger Nunatak and 3.63 kilometres (2.26 mi) east of Roman Knoll. Surmounting Russell East Glacier to the south. Named after the settlement of Lopyan in Western Bulgaria.

=== Mogilyane Peak ===
63°41′13″S 58°23′01″W. A rocky peak rising to 950 metres (3,120 ft) high. Situated 1.92 kilometres (1.19 mi) west-northwest of Coburg Peak, 1.83 kilometres (1.14 mi) north of Lopyan Crag and 1.55 kilometres (0.96 mi) east of Gigen Peak. Surmounting Cugnot Ice Piedmont to the northeast. Named after the settlement of Mogilyane in Southern Bulgaria.

=== Coburg Peak ===
63°41′42″S 58°20′57″W. A rocky peak rising to 783 metres (2,569 ft) high. Situated 1.25 kilometres (0.78 mi) west-northwest of Obidim Peak, 4.69 kilometres (2.91 mi) northeast of Siniger Nunatak, 3.32 kilometres (2.06 mi) east-southeast of Gigen Peak and 3.34 kilometres (2.08 mi) southwest of Chochoveni Nunatak. Surmounting Cugnot Ice Piedmont to the northeast. Named after the Bulgarian royal family of Coburg (Saxe-Coburg-Gotha), 1887-1946.

=== Obidim Peak ===
63°41′54″S 58°19′30″W. A rocky peak rising to 663 metres (2,175 ft) high. Situated 2 kilometres (1.2 mi) northwest of Panhard Nunatak and 1.25 kilometres (0.78 mi) east-southeast of Coburg Peak. Surmounting Cugnot Ice Piedmont to the NE. Named after the settlement of Obidim in Southwestern Bulgaria.

== Sources ==
REMA Explorer
The Reference Elevation Model of Antarctica (REMA) gives ice surface measurements of most of the continent. When a feature is ice-covered, the ice surface will differ from the underlying rock surface and will change over time. To see ice surface contours and elevation of a feature as of the last REMA update,
- Open the Antarctic REMA Explorer
- Enter the feature's coordinates in the box at the top left that says "Find address or place", then press enter
  The coordinates should be in DMS format, e.g. 65°05'03"S 64°01'02"W. If you only have degrees and minutes, you may not be able to locate the feature.
- Hover over the icons at the left of the screen
- Find "Hillshade" and click on that
  In the bottom right of the screen, set "Shading Factor" to 0 to get a clearer image
- Find "Contour" and click on that
  In the "Contour properties" box, select Contour Interval = 1m
  You can zoom in and out to see the ice surface contours of the feature and nearby features
- Find "Identify" and click on that
  Click the point where the contour lines seem to indicate the top of the feature
  The "Identify" box will appear to the top left. The Orthometric height is the elevation of the ice surface of the feature at this point.

- Antarctic REMA Explorer (Digital Elevation Models created by the Polar Geospatial Center from Maxar imagery), Polar Geospatial Center. University of Minnesota, 2019
- "Coburg Peak", Composite Gazetteer of Antarctica, Scientific Committee on Antarctic Research
- "Erul Heights", Composite Gazetteer of Antarctica, Scientific Committee on Antarctic Research
- "Gigen Peak", Composite Gazetteer of Antarctica, Scientific Committee on Antarctic Research
- Graham Land and South Shetland Islands, BAS: British Antarctic Survey, 2005
- "Lopyan Crag", Composite Gazetteer of Antarctica, Scientific Committee on Antarctic Research
- "Mogilyane Peak", Composite Gazetteer of Antarctica, Scientific Committee on Antarctic Research
- "Obidim Peak", Composite Gazetteer of Antarctica, Scientific Committee on Antarctic Research
- Trinity Peninsula (PDF) (Scale 1:250000 topographic map No. 5697), Institut für Angewandte Geodäsie and British Antarctic Survey, 1996, archived from the original (PDF) on 23 September 2015

This article incorporates public domain material from websites or documents of the United States Geological Survey.

This article includes information from the Antarctic Place-names Commission of Bulgaria which is used with permission.
