= Russell East Glacier =

Glacier in Antarctica

- Location within Antarctica
- Location: Trinity Peninsula
- Coordinates: 63°44′S 58°20′W
- Length: 6 nmi (11 km; 7 mi)
- Width: 3 nmi (6 km; 3 mi)
- Terminus: Prince Gustav Channel

Russell East Glacier (63°44′S 58°20′W) is a glacier, 6 nautical miles (11 km; 6.9 mi) long and 3 nautical miles (5.6 km; 3.5 mi) wide, which lies at the north end of Detroit Plateau and flows from Mount Canicula eastward into Prince Gustav Channel on the south side of Trinity Peninsula, Antarctica. This glacier together with Russell West Glacier, which flows westward into Bone Bay on the north side of Trinity Peninsula, form a through glacier across the north part of Antarctic Peninsula.

== Location ==
Trinity Peninsula, Antarctic Peninsula. Russell East Glacier towards the west of the southeast coast

Russell East Glacier is in Graham Land towards the west of the south coast of the Trinity Peninsula, which forms the tip of the Antarctic Peninsula. It flows in an east-southeast direction into the Prince Gustav Channel, which it enters to the north of Long Island. It is southwest of the Cugnot Ice Piedmont, south of Louis Philippe Plateau and northeast of Victory Glacier. At its head it saddles with Russell West Glacier, which flows west to Bone Bay. Nearby features include Mount Canicula, Mount Daimler and Asimuth Hill to the southwest, and Benz Pass and Panhard Nunatak to the northeast.

== Exploration and name ==
Russell East Glacier was first surveyed in 1946 by the Falkland Islands Dependencies Survey (FIDS). It was named by the United Kingdom Antarctic Place-Names Committee (UK-APC) for V.I. Russell, surveyor and leader of the FIDS base at Hope Bay in 1946.

== Southwestern features ==
Features to the southwest of the glacier include:

=== Srem Gap ===
63°43′20″S 58°32′20″W. A flat saddle of elevation 813 metres (2,667 ft) high extending 1.35 kilometres (0.84 mi), situated between Russell West Glacier to the northwest and a tributary glacier to Russell East Glacier to the southeast. Linking Irakli Peak and Trakiya Heights to the southwest, and Mount Canicula to the northeast. German-British mapping in 1996. Named after the settlement of Srem in Southeastern Bulgaria.

=== Mount Canicula ===
63°43′S 58°30′W. A mountain formed of two rock peaks, 890 and 825 metres (2,920 and 2,707 ft) high. It stands 3 nautical miles (5.6 km; 3.5 mi) east of Sirius Knoll on the divide separating Russell East Glacier and Russell West Glacier. Charted in 1946 by FIDS, and named by them because of the association with Sirius Knoll. Canicula is a synonym of Sirius, the dog star.

=== Trakiya Heights ===
63°45′07″S 58°31′10″W. Heights that rise to 1,336 metres (4,383 ft) high on Trinity Peninsula. They are bounded by Russell West Glacier to the north, Russell East Glacier to the northeast, Victory Glacier to the southwest and Zlidol Gate to the northwest. Surmounting Prince Gustav Channel, Weddell Sea to the southeast. Extending 10 kilometres (6.2 mi) in northwest–southeast direction and 5.9 kilometres (3.7 mi) in a northeast–southwest direction. German-British mapping in 1996. Named after the historical region of Trakiya (Thrace).

=== Azimuth Hill ===
63°45′S 58°16′W. A low rocky outcrop 85 metres (279 ft) high which extends to Prince Gustav Channel just south of the mouth of Russell East Glacier. So named by FIDS following a 1946 survey because a sun azimuth was obtained from a cairn built near the east end of the outcrop.

== Central features ==
Features along the line of the glacier include:

=== Roman Knoll ===
63°42′00″S 58°27′52″W. The ice-covered hill rising to 819 metres (2,687 ft) high between Mount Canicula and Erul Heights, on the southeast side of Verdikal Gap. Situated 3.38 kilometres (2.10 mi) northeast of Mount Canicula, 12.98 kilometres (8.07 mi) southeast of Lambuh Knoll, 2.77 kilometres (1.72 mi) southwest of Gigen Peak and 3.38 kilometres (2.10 mi) northwest of Siniger Nunatak. Surmounting Russell East Glacier to the southeast. German-British mapping in 1996. Named after the town of Roman in Northwestern Bulgaria.

=== Siniger Nunatak ===
63°43′23″S 58°25′12″W. A rocky hill rising to 647 metres (2,123 ft) high in the upper course of Russell East Glacier. Situated 2.97 kilometres (1.85 mi) northeast of Morava Peak in Trakiya Heights, 4.65 kilometres (2.89 mi) east of Mount Canicula, 3.85 kilometres (2.39 mi) south of Gigen Peak and 6.54 kilometres (4.06 mi) west-southwest of Panhard Nunatak. German-British mapping in 1996. Named after the settlement of Siniger in Southern Bulgaria.

=== Smokinya Cove ===
63°44′00″S 58°15′40″W. A 3.5 kilometres (2.2 mi) wide cove on Prince Gustav Channel indenting for 2.2 kilometres (1.4 mi) the southeast coast of Trinity Peninsula. Entered north of Azimuth Hill. German-British mapping in 1996. Named after the seaside locality of Smokinya in Southeastern Bulgaria.

== Northeastern features ==
Features to the northeast of the glacier include:

=== Benz Pass ===
63°41′S 58°22′W. A narrow pass between the south cliffs of Louis Philippe Plateau and a rock nunatak 2 nautical miles (3.7 km; 2.3 mi) northeast of the head of Russell East Glacier. Mapped from surveys by FIDS (1960–61). Named by UK-APC for Carl Benz (1844-1929), German engineer who constructed the first practical gasoline motor car, in 1885.

=== Erul Heights ===
63°42′10″S 58°21′10″W. Heights rising to 1,092 metres (3,583 ft) high at Gigen Peak. Bounded by Russell East Glacier to the south and Cugnot Ice Piedmont to the north. Surmounting Prince Gustav Channel, Weddell Sea to the southeast. Extending 8 kilometres (5.0 mi) from Benz Pass in east-southeast direction towards Smokinya Cove. German-British mapping in 1996. Named after the settlement of Erul in Western Bulgaria.

=== Panhard Nunatak ===
63°42′S 58°17′W. The nearest nunatak to the coast on the north side of Russell East Glacier. Named by UK-APC for René Panhard (1841-1908), French engineer who in 1891 was jointly responsible with E. Levassor for a motor car design which originated the principles on which most subsequent developments were based.

== Sources ==
- Alberts, Fred G., ed. (1995), Geographic Names of the Antarctic (PDF) (2 ed.), United States Board on Geographic Names This article incorporates public domain material from websites or documents of the United States Board on Geographic Names.

REMA Explorer
The Reference Elevation Model of Antarctica (REMA) gives ice surface measurements of most of the continent. When a feature is ice-covered, the ice surface will differ from the underlying rock surface and will change over time. To see ice surface contours and elevation of a feature as of the last REMA update,
- Open the Antarctic REMA Explorer
- Enter the feature's coordinates in the box at the top left that says "Find address or place", then press enter
  The coordinates should be in DMS format, e.g. 65°05'03"S 64°01'02"W. If you only have degrees and minutes, you may not be able to locate the feature.
- Hover over the icons at the left of the screen
- Find "Hillshade" and click on that
  In the bottom right of the screen, set "Shading Factor" to 0 to get a clearer image
- Find "Contour" and click on that
  In the "Contour properties" box, select Contour Interval = 1m
  You can zoom in and out to see the ice surface contours of the feature and nearby features
- Find "Identify" and click on that
  Click the point where the contour lines seem to indicate the top of the feature
  The "Identify" box will appear to the top left. The Orthometric height is the elevation of the ice surface of the feature at this point.

- Antarctic REMA Explorer (Digital Elevation Models created by the Polar Geospatial Center from Maxar imagery), Polar Geospatial Center, University of Minnesota, 2019
- "Erul Heights", Composite Gazetteer of Antarctica, Scientific Committee on Antarctic Research
- Graham Land and South Shetland Islands, BAS: British Antarctic Survey, 2005
- "Roman Knoll", Composite Gazetteer of Antarctica, Scientific Committee on Antarctic Research
- "Siniger Nunatak", Composite Gazetteer of Antarctica, Scientific Committee on Antarctic Research
- "Smokinya Cove", Composite Gazetteer of Antarctica, Scientific Committee on Antarctic Research
- "Srem Gap", Composite Gazetteer of Antarctica, Scientific Committee on Antarctic Research
- "Trakiya Heights", Composite Gazetteer of Antarctica, Scientific Committee on Antarctic Research
- Trinity Peninsula (PDF) (Scale 1:250000 topographic map No. 5697), Institut für Angewandte Geodäsie and British Antarctic Survey, 1996, archived from the original (PDF) on 23 September 2015

This article incorporates public domain material from websites or documents of the United States Geological Survey.
