= Desudava Glacier =

Glacier in Antarctica

- Location within Antarctica
- Location: Nordenskjöld Coast, Graham Land, Antarctica
- Coordinates: 64°26′50″S 60°10′00″W
- Terminus: Mundraga Bay

Desudava Glacier (64°26′50″S 60°10′00″W) is the 15.5 kilometres (9.6 mi) long and 5 kilometres (3.1 mi) wide glacier on Nordenskjöld Coast in Graham Land, Antarctica situated south of Dinsmoor Glacier and east-northeast of Boryana Glacier.

== Location ==
Nordenskjöld Coast, Antarctic Peninsula. Odrin Bay in center

Desudava Glacier is on the Nordenskjöld Coast of the Antarctic Peninsula. It is southeast of the Detroit Plateau and north of the Weddell Sea. It is drains the northeast slopes of Gusla Peak and adjacent slopes of Detroit Plateau further north, the south slopes of Ivats Peak and the west slopes of Mount Elliott, and flows southwards into Mundraga Bay next east of Boryana Glacier.

== Name ==
Desudava Glacier is named after the ancient Thracian town of Desudava in southwestern Bulgaria.

== Features ==
Features and nearby features include:

=== Ivats Peak ===
64°24′39″S 60°10′54″W. A peak rising to 910 metres (2,990 ft) high in the southeast foothills of Detroit Plateau. Situated at the west extremity of a rocky ridge linked to Mount Elliott, 2.61 kilometres (1.62 mi) south-southeast of Kavlak Peak and 3.69 kilometres (2.29 mi) northeast of Gusla Peak. Surmounting Dinsmoor Glacier to the north and Desudava Glacier to the south. Named after the 10–11th century Bulgarian boyar and warrior Ivats.

=== Gusla Peak ===
64°25′56″S 60°14′25″W. A peak rising to 842 metres (2,762 ft) high in the southeast foothills of Detroit Plateau. Situated at the north-northwest extremity of a narrow 3.9 kilometres (2.4 mi) long rocky ridge, 4.88 kilometres (3.03 mi) south-southwest of Kavlak Peak. Surmounting Desudava Glacier to the north and east, and Boryana Glacier to the south. Named after the settlement of Gusla in Northeastern Bulgaria.

=== Vedrare Nunatak ===
64°25′44″S 60°07′05″W. A rocky peak rising to 798 metres (2,618 ft) high in eastern Desudava Glacier. Situated 3.67 kilometres (2.28 mi) southeast of Ivats Peak, 2.35 kilometres (1.46 mi) southwest of Mount Elliott and 1.5 kilometres (0.93 mi) north-northeast of Zgorigrad Nunatak. Named after the settlement of Vedrare in Southern Bulgaria.

=== Zgorigrad Nunatak ===
64°26′30″S 60°07′43″W. A rocky peak rising to 829 metres (2,720 ft) high in eastern Desudava Glacier. Situated 5.48 kilometres (3.41 mi) east-southeast of Gusla Peak, 1.5 kilometres (0.93 mi) south-southwest of Vedrare Nunatak and 2.8 kilometres (1.7 mi) north-northeast of Storgozia Nunatak. Named after the settlement of Zgorigrad in Northwestern Bulgaria.

=== Storgozia Nunatak ===
64°27′58″S 60°08′28″W. A rocky hill rising to 593 metres (1,946 ft) high in eastern Desudava Glacier. Situated 8.65 kilometres (5.37 mi) east of Rice Bastion, 6.1 kilometres (3.8 mi) southeast of Gusla Peak, and 2.8 kilometres (1.7 mi) south-southwest of Zgorigrad Nunatak. Named after the ancient town of Storgozia in Northern Bulgaria.

=== Rice Bastion ===
64°27′S 60°19′W. A substantial mountain mass surmounted by a small crown of exposed rock which appears slightly higher than the plateau behind it, projecting from the edge of Detroit Plateau, 8 nautical miles (15 km; 9.2 mi) southwest of Mount Elliott. Mapped from surveys by the Falkland Islands Dependencies Survey (FIDS) (1960-61). Named by the UK Antarctic Place-Names Committee (UK-APC) for Lee Rice, FIDS surveyor at Hope Bay (1957-58), who worked in this area.

=== Boryana Glacier ===
64°27′40″S 60°14′10″W, An 11 kilometres (6.8 mi) long and 3.2 kilometres (2.0 mi) wide glacier situated west-southwest of Desudava Glacier and northeast of Darvari Glacier. It drains the southeast slopes of Detroit Plateau, flowing between Rice Bastion and Gusla Peak, and turning southwards to enter Mundraga Bay between Desudava Glacier and Darvari Glacier. Named after the settlement of Boryana in Northeastern Bulgaria.

=== Darvari Glacier ===
64°29′20″S 60°17′00″W. A 9 kilometres (5.6 mi) long in NW-SE direction and 1.7 kilometres (1.1 mi) wide glacier situated southwest of Boryana Glacier and northeast of Zaychar Glacier. It drains the southeast slopes of Detroit Plateau, flowing between Rice Bastion and Grivitsa Ridge, and entering Mundraga Bay 6 kilometres (3.7 mi) north of Fothergill Point. Named after the settlement of Darvari in Northern Bulgaria.

== Sources ==
- Alberts, Fred G., ed. (1995), Geographic Names of the Antarctic (PDF) (2 ed.), United States Board on Geographic Names This article incorporates public domain material from websites or documents of the United States Board on Geographic Names.

REMA Explorer
The Reference Elevation Model of Antarctica (REMA) gives ice surface measurements of most of the continent. When a feature is ice-covered, the ice surface will differ from the underlying rock surface and will change over time. To see ice surface contours and elevation of a feature as of the last REMA update,
- Open the Antarctic REMA Explorer
- Enter the feature's coordinates in the box at the top left that says "Find address or place", then press enter
  The coordinates should be in DMS format, e.g. 65°05'03"S 64°01'02"W. If you only have degrees and minutes, you may not be able to locate the feature.
- Hover over the icons at the left of the screen
- Find "Hillshade" and click on that
  In the bottom right of the screen, set "Shading Factor" to 0 to get a clearer image
- Find "Contour" and click on that
  In the "Contour properties" box, select Contour Interval = 1m
  You can zoom in and out to see the ice surface contours of the feature and nearby features
- Find "Identify" and click on that
  Click the point where the contour lines seem to indicate the top of the feature
  The "Identify" box will appear to the top left. The Orthometric height is the elevation of the ice surface of the feature at this point.

- Antarctic REMA Explorer (Digital Elevation Models created by the Polar Geospatial Center from Maxar imagery), Polar Geospatial Center, University of Minnesota, 2019
- "Boryana Glacier", Composite Gazetteer of Antarctica, Scientific Committee on Antarctic Research
- "Darvari Glacier", Composite Gazetteer of Antarctica, Scientific Committee on Antarctic Research
- "Desudava Glacier", Composite Gazetteer of Antarctica, Scientific Committee on Antarctic Research
- Graham Land and South Shetland Islands, BAS: British Antarctic Survey, 2005
- "Gusla Peak", Composite Gazetteer of Antarctica, Scientific Committee on Antarctic Research
- "Ivats Peak", Composite Gazetteer of Antarctica, Scientific Committee on Antarctic Research
- "Storgozia Nunatak", Composite Gazetteer of Antarctica, Scientific Committee on Antarctic Research
- "Vedrare Nunatak", Composite Gazetteer of Antarctica, Scientific Committee on Antarctic Research
- "Zgorigrad Nunatak", Composite Gazetteer of Antarctica, Scientific Committee on Antarctic Research
