= Aitkenhead Glacier =

Glacier in Antarctica

- Location within Antarctica
- Location: Graham Land, Antarctica
- Coordinates: 63°57′S 58°44′W
- Length: 16 km (9.9 mi)

Aitkenhead Glacier (63°57′S 58°44′W) is a 10 nautical miles (19 km; 12 mi) long glacier flowing east-southeast from the Detroit Plateau, Graham Land, into Prince Gustav Channel (close north of Alectoria Island).

== Location ==
Trinity Peninsula, Antarctic Peninsula. Louis Philippe Plateau towards the southwest

Aitkenhead Glacier is in Graham Land on the south coast of the Trinity Peninsula, which forms the tip of the Antarctic Peninsula. It descends in a southeast direction from the Detroit Plateau to enter Prince Gustav Channel opposite Alectoria Island. Nearby features include Tufft Nunatak to the north and Simpson Nunatak and Mount Roberts to the south.

== Mapping and name ==
Aitkenhead Glacier was mapped from surveys by the Falkland Islands Dependencies Survey (FIDS) (1960–61). It was named by the UK Antarctic Place-Names Committee (UK-APC) for Neil Aitkenhead, a FIDS geologist at Hope Bay (1959–60).

== Nearby features ==
Nearby features include, from west to east:

=== Mount Roberts ===
64°00′S 58°49′W. A dark, mostly ice-free rock peak with a flat, sloping top, 955 metres (3,133 ft) high, which is isolated from the Detroit Plateau to the west and lies 3 nautical miles (5.6 km; 3.5 mi) south of Aitkenhead Glacier. First charted by the FIDS, 1945, and named for D.W. Roberts, Manager of the Falkland Islands Company in 1945, who was of assistance to the expedition.

=== Mancho Buttress ===
63°54′58″S 58°50′52″W. An ice-covered buttress rising to 1,386 metres (4,547 ft) high on the northeast side of Detroit Plateau. Situated 4.61 kilometres (2.86 mi) northwest of Baley Nunatak. Precipitous and partly ice-free southwest slopes. Surmounting Aitkenhead Glacier to the southwest and south. Named after Mancho Peak in Rila mountain, Southwestern Bulgaria.

=== Baley Nunatak ===
63°56′44″S 58°46′54″W. A rocky hill rising to 632 metres (2,073 ft) high on the north side of Aitkenhead Glacier. Situated in the southeast foothills of Mancho Buttress, 4.69 kilometres (2.91 mi) northwest of Hitar Petar Nunatak and 6.45 kilometres (4.01 mi) north-northwest of Mount Roberts. Named after the settlement of Baley in Northwestern Bulgaria.

=== Hitar Petar Nunatak ===
63°57′58″S 58°42′12″W. A rocky hill rising to 434 metres (1,424 ft) high on the coast of Prince Gustav Channel, next south of the terminus of Aitkenhead Glacier. Situated 7.35 kilometres (4.57 mi) northeast of Mount Roberts, 4.69 kilometres (2.91 mi) southeast of Baley Nunatak and 435 kilometres (270 mi) south of Tuff Nunatak. Named after the Bulgarian folkloric hero Hitar Petar ("Sly Peter").

=== Tufft Nunatak ===
63°55′S 58°42′W. A small nunatak 3 nautical miles (5.6 km; 3.5 mi) southwest of Mount Bradley. Named by the UK Antarctic Place-Names Committee (UK-APC) for Ronald W. Tufft of FIDS, a member of the reconnaissance party for the Detroit Plateau journey in February 1957.

== Sources ==
- Alberts, Fred G., ed. (1995), Geographic Names of the Antarctic (PDF) (2 ed.), United States Board on Geographic Names This article incorporates public domain material from websites or documents of the United States Board on Geographic Names.

REMA Explorer
The Reference Elevation Model of Antarctica (REMA) gives ice surface measurements of most of the continent. When a feature is ice-covered, the ice surface will differ from the underlying rock surface and will change over time. To see ice surface contours and elevation of a feature as of the last REMA update,
- Open the Antarctic REMA Explorer
- Enter the feature's coordinates in the box at the top left that says "Find address or place", then press enter
  The coordinates should be in DMS format, e.g. 65°05'03"S 64°01'02"W. If you only have degrees and minutes, you may not be able to locate the feature.
- Hover over the icons at the left of the screen
- Find "Hillshade" and click on that
  In the bottom right of the screen, set "Shading Factor" to 0 to get a clearer image
- Find "Contour" and click on that
  In the "Contour properties" box, select Contour Interval = 1m
  You can zoom in and out to see the ice surface contours of the feature and nearby features
- Find "Identify" and click on that
  Click the point where the contour lines seem to indicate the top of the feature
  The "Identify" box will appear to the top left. The Orthometric height is the elevation of the ice surface of the feature at this point.

- Antarctic REMA Explorer (Digital Elevation Models created by the Polar Geospatial Center from Maxar imagery), Polar Geospatial Center, University of Minnesota, 2019
- "Baley Nunatak", Composite Gazetteer of Antarctica, Scientific Committee on Antarctic Research
- Graham Land and South Shetland Islands, BAS: British Antarctic Survey, 2005
- "Hitar Petar Nunatak", Composite Gazetteer of Antarctica, Scientific Committee on Antarctic Research
- "Mancho Buttress", Composite Gazetteer of Antarctica, Scientific Committee on Antarctic Research
- Trinity Peninsula (PDF) (Scale 1:250000 topographic map No. 5697), Institut für Angewandte Geodäsie and British Antarctic Survey, 1996, archived from the original (PDF) on 23 September 2015

This article incorporates public domain material from websites or documents of the United States Geological Survey.
