= Russell West Glacier =

Glacier in Antarctica

- Location within Antarctica
- Location: Trinity Peninsula
- Coordinates: 63°40′S 58°50′W
- Length: 11 nmi (20 km; 13 mi)
- Width: 4 nmi (7 km; 5 mi)
- Terminus: Prince Gustav Channel

Russell West Glacier (63°40′S 58°50′W) is a glacier, 11 nautical miles (20 km; 13 mi) long and 4 nautical miles (7.4 km; 4.6 mi) wide, which lies immediately north of Detroit Plateau and flows from Mount Canicula westward into Bone Bay, on the north side of Trinity Peninsula. This glacier together with Russell East Glacier, which flows eastward into Prince Gustav Channel on the south side of Trinity Peninsula, form a through glacier across the north part of Antarctic Peninsula.

== Location ==
Russell West Glacier flows west into the northwest shore of the western end of the Trinity Peninsula, which forms the tip of the Antarctic Peninsula. Its mouth is in Bone Bay on the Bransfield Strait, northeast of Charcot Bay, east of the Orléans Strait, south of Astrolabe Island and southwest of Lafond Bay. It is bounded to the southwest by the Gavin Ice Piedmont. The head of the glacier is between Allen Knoll and Sirius Knoll. At its mouth it passes Wimple Dome to the north.

- Copernix satellite view

== Mapping and name ==
Russell West Glacier was first surveyed in 1946 by the Falkland Islands Dependencies Survey (FIDS). It was named by the UK Antarctic Place-Names Committee (UK-APC) for Victor Ian Russell, surveyor and leader of the FIDS base at Hope Bay in 1946. Russell was head of the Hope Bay station in 1946 and 1947. In April 1946 Russell led a party of four that, despite gales and snow, found a route across the northern Antarctic Peninsula via what is now called Russell East Glacier. In July and August 1946 Russel reached the west coast via what is now called Russell West Glacier.

== Glaciology ==
Russell West Glacier is in the moist climatic region of the west coast of Trinity Peninsula. In this area rime ice is deposited in huge masses on the northwest faces of nunataks, and these occasionally break off and join the glacier ice below the nunatak. In the late 1950s an ice block measuring 20 metres (66 ft) by 4 by 4 metres (13 by 13 ft) was found below a ridge on Mount Canicula that faces northwest. (Mount Canicula stands on the divide separating Russell East Glacier and Russell West Glacier.) The velocity of the glacier measured at its maximum ice thickness increased by 73% between 1993 and 2014.

== Features ==
Trinity Peninsula on Antarctic Peninsula. Russell West Glacier at northwest end

Features of the glacier include:

=== Verdikal Gap ===
63°41′00″S 58°30′30″W. A flat ice-covered saddle of elevation over 801 metres (2,628 ft), part of the ice divide between Bransfield Strait and Prince Gustav Channel. Extending 5.3 kilometres (3.3 mi) between Louis Philippe Plateau to the north and Mount Canicula and Trakiya Heights to the south. Overlooking Russell West Glacier to the west and Russell East Glacier to the southeast. Named after the settlement of Verdikal in Western Bulgaria.

=== Allen Knoll ===
63°40′S 58°35′W. A steep-sided snow dome rising from a flat snowfield 2 nautical miles (3.7 km; 2.3 mi) northwest of the head of Russell West Glacier. Mapped from surveys by the Falkland Islands Dependencies Survey (FIDS) (1960-61). Named by the UK Antarctic Place-Names Committee (UK-APC) for Keith Allen, FIDS radio operator at Hope Bay in 1959 and 1960.

=== Sirius Knoll ===
63°43′S 58°36′W. Conspicuous ice-covered knoll, 1,010 metres (3,310 ft) high, marking the northeast end of Detroit Plateau in the central part of Trinity Peninsula. Charted in 1946 by the FIDS and named after Sirius, the dog star.

=== Zlidol Gate ===
63°44′10″S 58°37′40″W. A saddle of elevation over 800 metres (2,600 ft) high on Trinity Peninsula, Antarctic Peninsula separating the Detroit Plateau to the west from Trakiya Heights to the east. The feature is horseshoe-shaped, jutting out to Russell West Glacier to the north, with its southern approach from Victory Glacier narrowing to 500 metres (1,600 ft). Named after the settlement of Zlidol in Northwestern Bulgaria.

=== Chelopech Hill ===
63°43′28″S 58°42′03″W An ice-covered hill rising to 938 metres (3,077 ft). Situated in the north foothills of Detroit Plateau, 1.63 kilometres (1.01 mi) north-northwest of Mount Schuyler, 4.07 kilometres (2.53 mi) east of Zlatolist Hill, and 1.9 kilometres (1.2 mi) west-southwest of Sirius Knoll. Surmounting Russell West Glacier to the north. Named after the settlement of Chelopech in Western Bulgaria.

=== Zlatolist Hill ===
63°43′32″S 58°47′00″W An ice-covered hill rising to 924 metres (3,031 ft). Situated in the north foothills of Detroit Plateau, 5.03 kilometres (3.13 mi) west-northwest of Mount Schuyler, 7.09 kilometres (4.41 mi) northeast of Aureole Hills, 7.2 kilometres (4.5 mi) east of Tinsel Dome. Surmounting Russell West Glacier to the north. Named after the settlement of Zlatolist in Southwestern Bulgaria.

=== Tinsel Dome ===
63°44′S 58°55′W. Small ice-covered hill, 700 metres (2,300 ft) high, standing between Aureole Hills and Bone Bay. Charted in 1948 by the Falkland Islands Dependencies Survey (FIDS) who gave this descriptive name.

== Sources ==
- Alberts, Fred G., ed. (1995), Geographic Names of the Antarctic (PDF) (2 ed.), United States Board on Geographic Names This article incorporates public domain material from websites or documents of the United States Board on Geographic Names.

REMA Explorer
The Reference Elevation Model of Antarctica (REMA) gives ice surface measurements of most of the continent. When a feature is ice-covered, the ice surface will differ from the underlying rock surface and will change over time. To see ice surface contours and elevation of a feature as of the last REMA update,
- Open the Antarctic REMA Explorer
- Enter the feature's coordinates in the box at the top left that says "Find address or place", then press enter
  The coordinates should be in DMS format, e.g. 65°05'03"S 64°01'02"W. If you only have degrees and minutes, you may not be able to locate the feature.
- Hover over the icons at the left of the screen
- Find "Hillshade" and click on that
  In the bottom right of the screen, set "Shading Factor" to 0 to get a clearer image
- Find "Contour" and click on that
  In the "Contour properties" box, select Contour Interval = 1m
  You can zoom in and out to see the ice surface contours of the feature and nearby features
- Find "Identify" and click on that
  Click the point where the contour lines seem to indicate the top of the feature
  The "Identify" box will appear to the top left. The Orthometric height is the elevation of the ice surface of the feature at this point.

- Antarctic REMA Explorer (Digital Elevation Models created by the Polar Geospatial Center from Maxar imagery), Polar Geospatial Center. University of Minnesota, 2019
- "Chelopech Hill", Composite Gazetteer of Antarctica, Scientific Committee on Antarctic Research
- Graham Land and South Shetland Islands, BAS: British Antarctic Survey, 2005
- Koerner, R.M. (1961), "Glaciological Observations in Trinity Peninsula, Graham Land, Antarctica", Journal of Glaciology, 3 (30), International Glaciological Society: 1063–1074, doi:10.3189/S0022143000017470
- Seehaus, Thorsten (2018), "Changes in glacier dynamics in the northern Antarctic Peninsula since 1985", The Cryosphere, 12: 577–594, doi:10.5194/tc-12-577-2018-supplement
- Trinity Peninsula (PDF) (Scale 1:250000 topographic map No. 5697), Institut für Angewandte Geodäsie and British Antarctic Survey, 1996, archived from the original (PDF) on 23 September 2015
- "Verdikal Gap", Composite Gazetteer of Antarctica, Scientific Committee on Antarctic Research
- "Victor Russell", The Telegraph, 10 January 2001
- "Zlatolist Hill", Composite Gazetteer of Antarctica, Scientific Committee on Antarctic Research
- "Zlidol Gate", Composite Gazetteer of Antarctica, Scientific Committee on Antarctic Research
