= Chorbadzhiyski =

Chorbadzhiyski (Bulgarian: Чорбаджийски) is a surname derived from the word "chorbadzhi". Notable people with the surname include:

- Bozhidar Chorbadzhiyski (born 1995), Bulgarian football defender, older brother of Georgi
- Dimitar Hristov Chorbadjisky, real name of Chudomir (1890–1967), Bulgarian writer and painter
- Georgi Chorbadzhiyski (born 2004), Bulgarian football midfielder, younger brother of Bozhidar
