= Lepitsa =

Coordinates: 43°19′34″N 24°01′47″E

Lepitsa (Bulgarian: Лепица [lɛˈpit͡sɐ]) is a village in northwestern Bulgaria situated in the Cherven Bryag Municipality, Pleven Province. It has a population of 503.

Lepitsa Peak on Trinity Peninsula in Antarctica is named after the village.
