= Bone Bay =

Bone Bay may refer to

- Bone Bay (Antarctica), a bay on the Trinity Peninsula, Graham Land, Antarctica.
- Gulf of Boni, a gulf in the island of Sulawesi, Indonesia
