= Senokos, Blagoevgrad Province =

Senokos
- Village
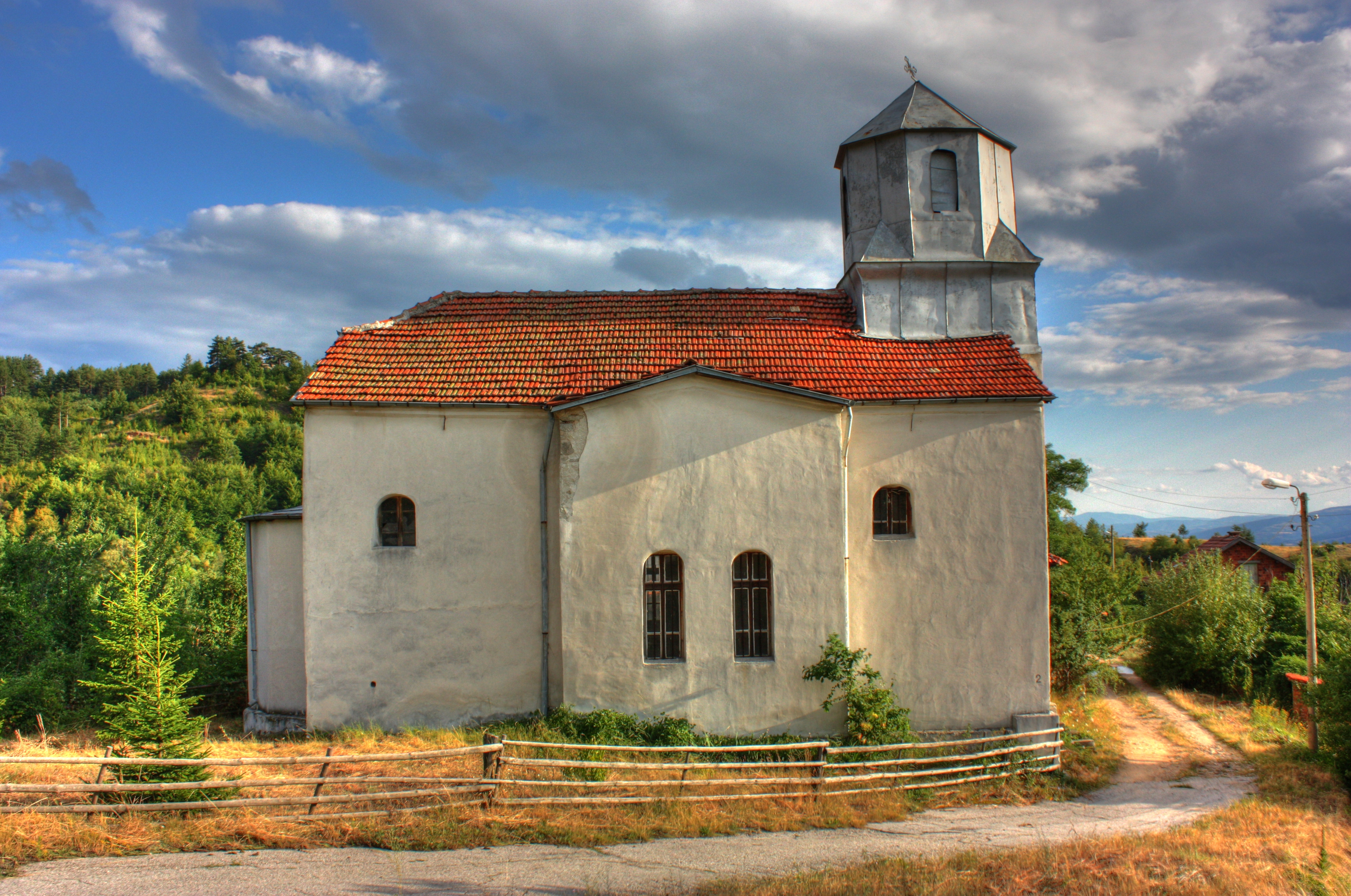
- Saint Demetrius Church, Senokos

- Location within Bulgaria
- Coordinates: 41.8167°N 23.2333°E
- Country: Bulgaria
- Province: Blagoevgrad Province
- Municipality: Simitli Municipality
- Time zone: UTC+2 (EET)
  - Summer (DST): UTC+3 (EEST)

Senokos (Greek: Σενοκός) is a village in Simitli Municipality, in Blagoevgrad Province, in southwestern Bulgaria.

Senokos Nunatak on Trinity Peninsula in Antarctica is named after the village.
