= Prince Gustav Ice Shelf =

Ice shelf in Antarctica

Coordinates: 64°15′S 58°30′W

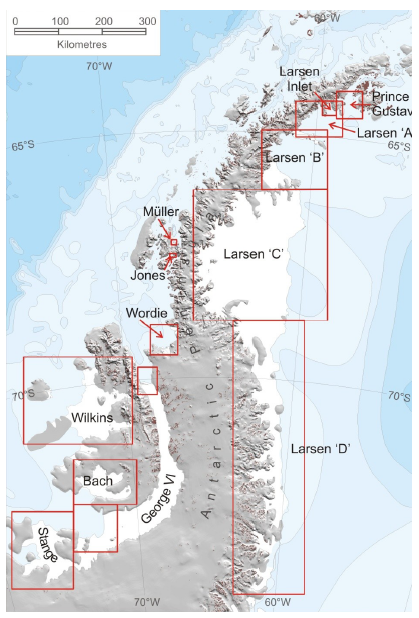
The ice shelves of the Antarctic peninsula

Prince Gustav Ice Shelf () was an ice shelf of more than 15 nautical miles (28 km) extent occupying the south part of Prince Gustav Channel, including Rohss Bay, James Ross Island. Named by United Kingdom Antarctic Place-Names Committee (UK-APC) in 1990 in association with the channel. The ice shelf has since retreated and collapsed; in 1995 Prince Gustav Channel was open throughout its length, and only a remnant in Rohss Bay remained.

Prince Gustav ice shelf also retreated in the mid-Holocene period 5000 to 2000 years before present, [this] "corresponds to regional climate warming deduced from other paleoenvironmental records." This resulted in seasonally open water in the Prince Gustav Channel, as today.
