= Chudomir =

Bulgarian writer and painter (1890–1967)

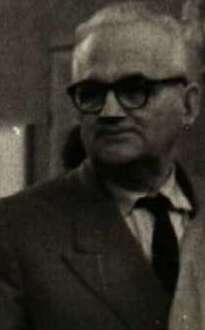
Chudomir Portrait

Chudomir (Bulgarian: Чудомир) (March 25, 1890 – December 26, 1967), born Dimitar Hristov Chorbadjisky (Bulgarian: Димитър Христов Чорбаджийски), was a Bulgarian writer and painter.

He is famous for his short stories, such as "I'm not One of Them" ("Не съм от тях") and "Locals" ("Нашенци"), satirizing the human weaknesses and political vices of his time.

== Biography ==
He was born in village Turia (Bulgarian Kingdom) on March 25, 1890 and died in Sofia (People's Republic of Bulgaria) in 1967. He was one of the five children in the family of Maria Doncheva and Hristo Chorbadjiiski. Until the age of 16, he studied in a local school. In 1913 he graduated from the National-painter-industrial college in Sofia. He took part in the Balkan wars and World War I. In 1921 he married Mary Nonova. He was a school teacher for 13 years (1920–1933) in Kazanlak. From 1929–1930 Chudomir specialized drawing in Paris. Until his death he was the president of 'Iskra' library and director of the Ethnographic museum in Kazanlak.

== Modern Media ==
In 2012 there was a documentary film released about Chudomir that detailed the supposed "secrets" of the Bulgarian writer and artist. The film starring Marius Kurkinsky was written by Georgi Toshev and Yavor Vesselinov as well as directed by Vesselinov.

== Honour ==
Chudomir Cove in Graham Land, Antarctica is named after Chudomir.

== Gallery ==
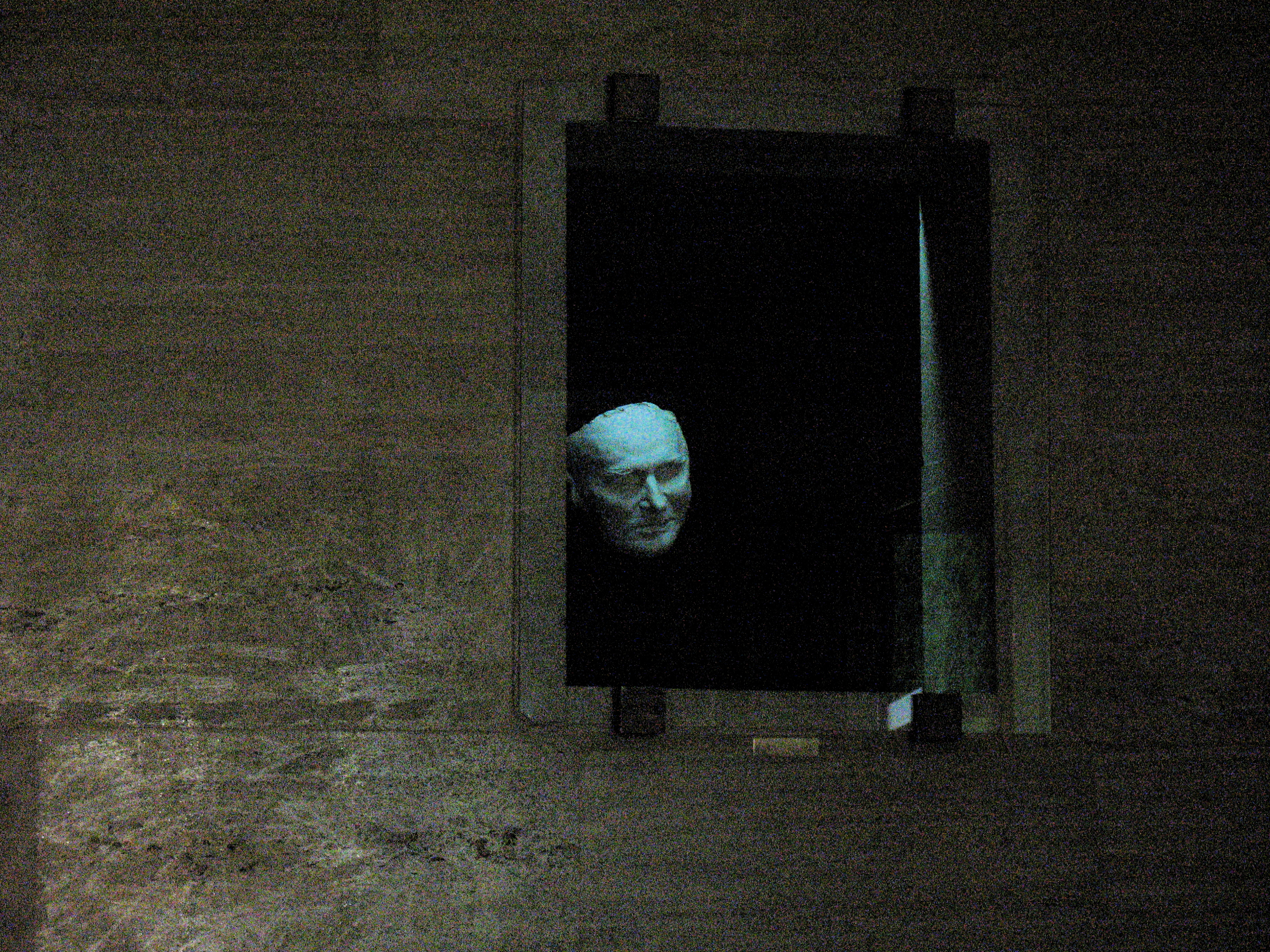
"Posthumous mask“

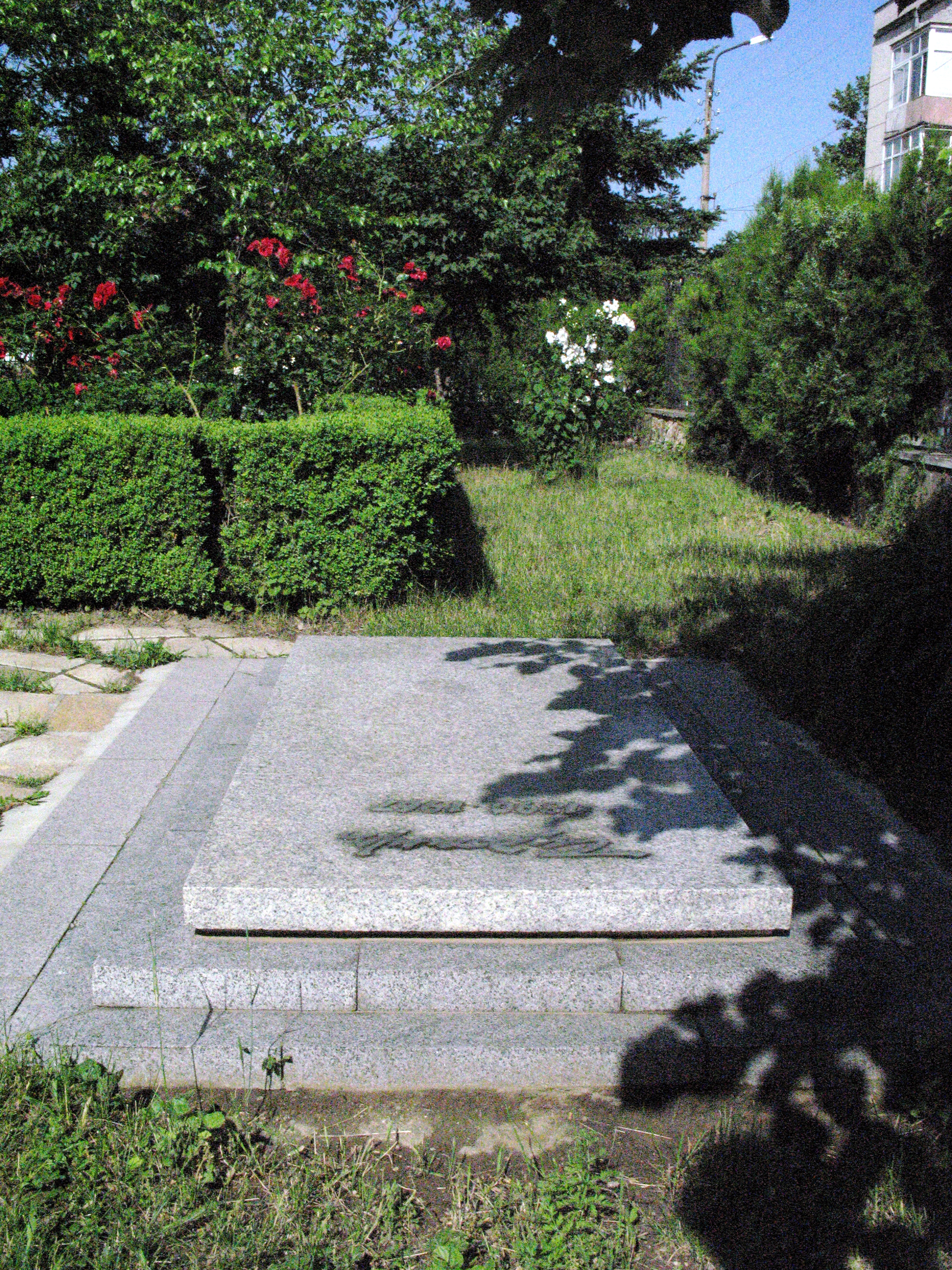
"The grave of Chudomir“

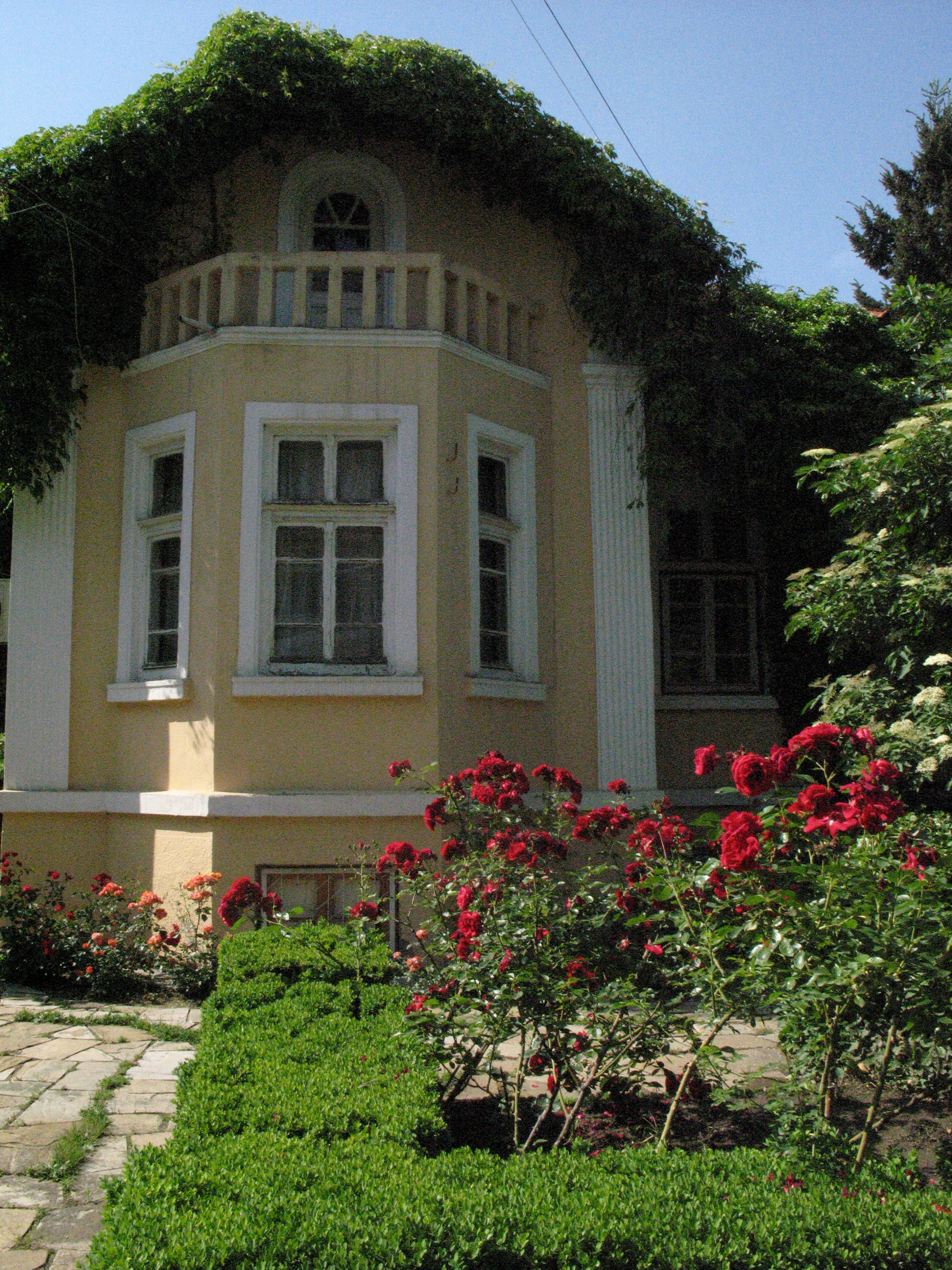
"Literary and Art Museum of "Chudomir" in Kazanlak“

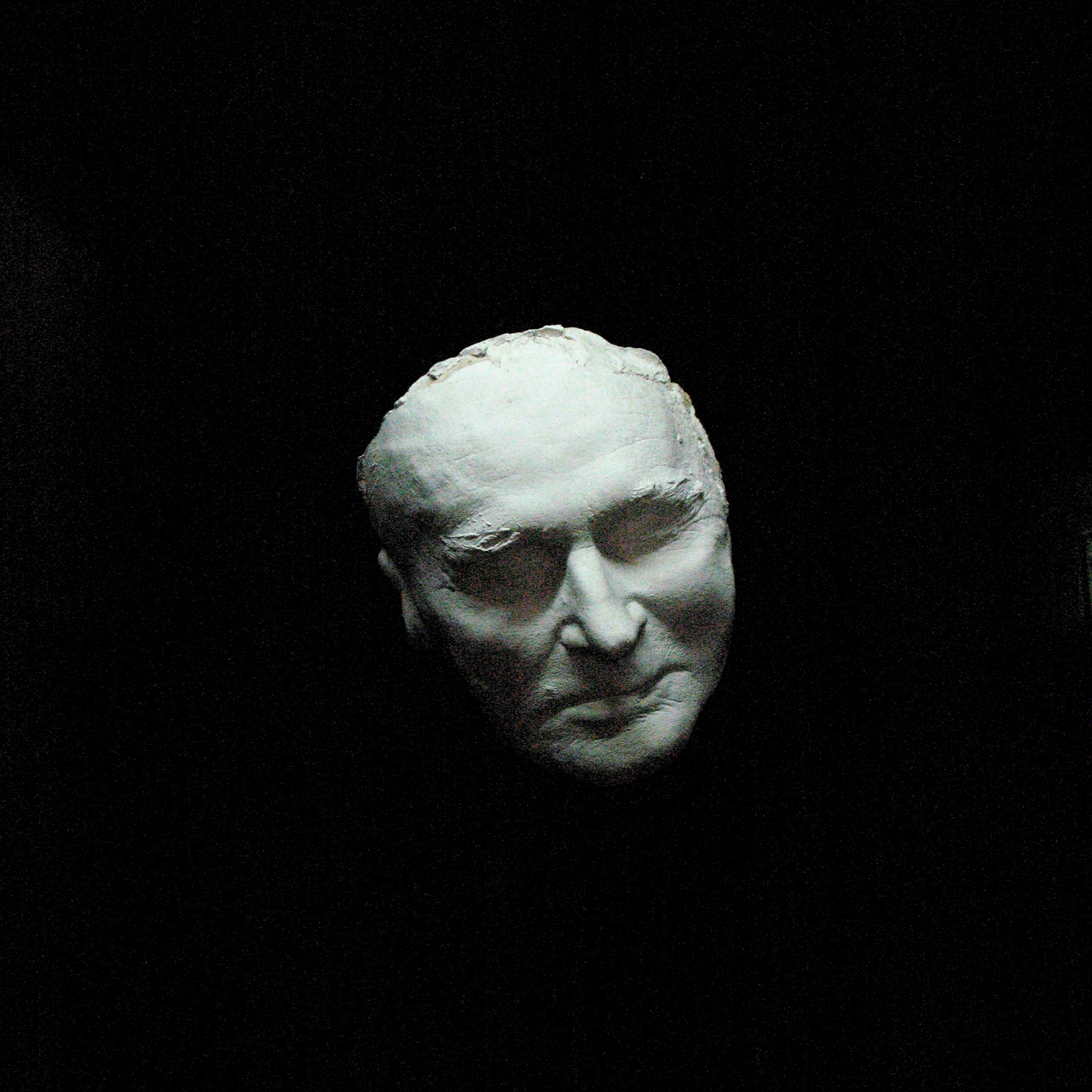
"Posthumous mask on Chudomir“

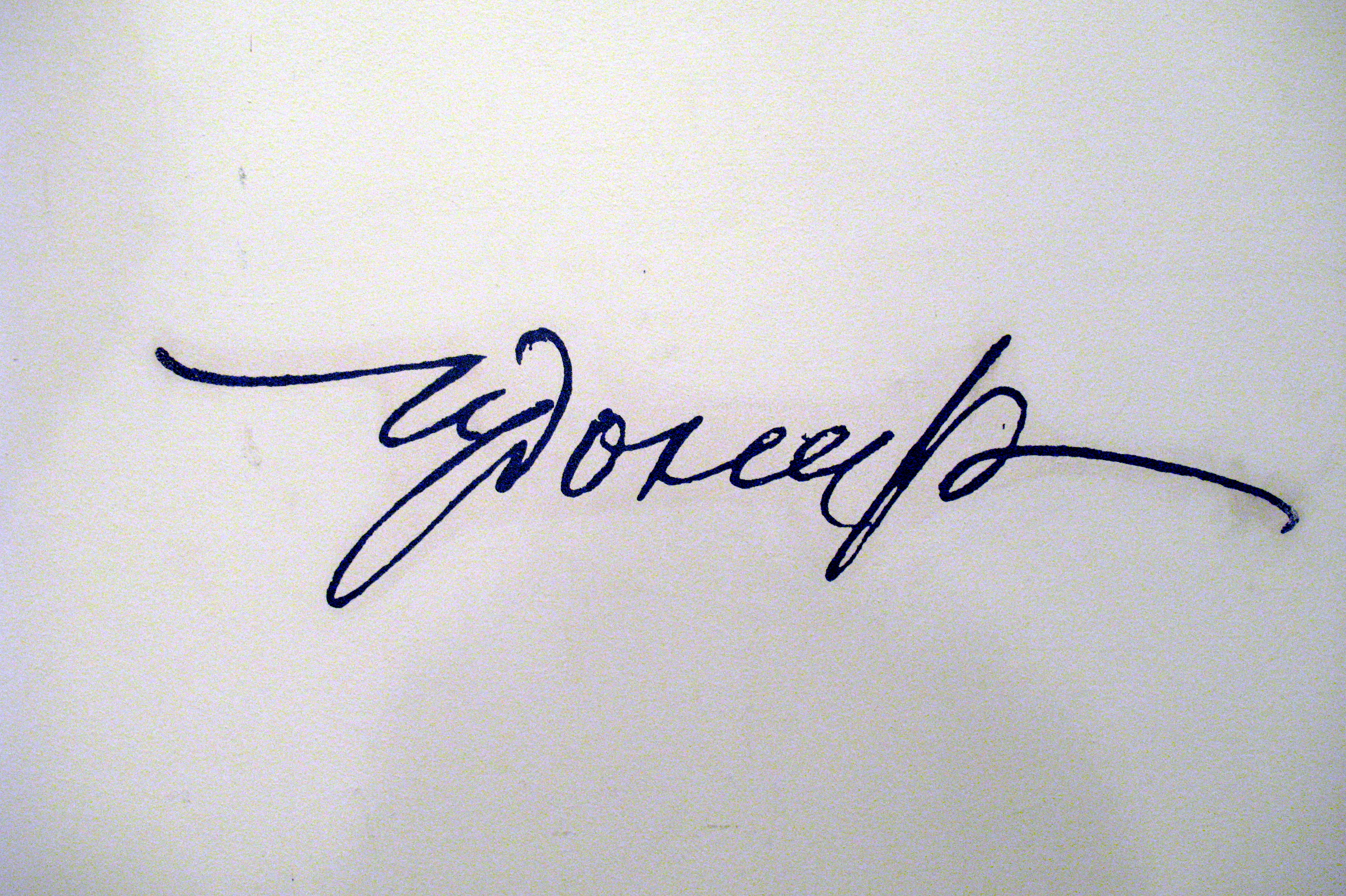
"Chudomir's autograph“

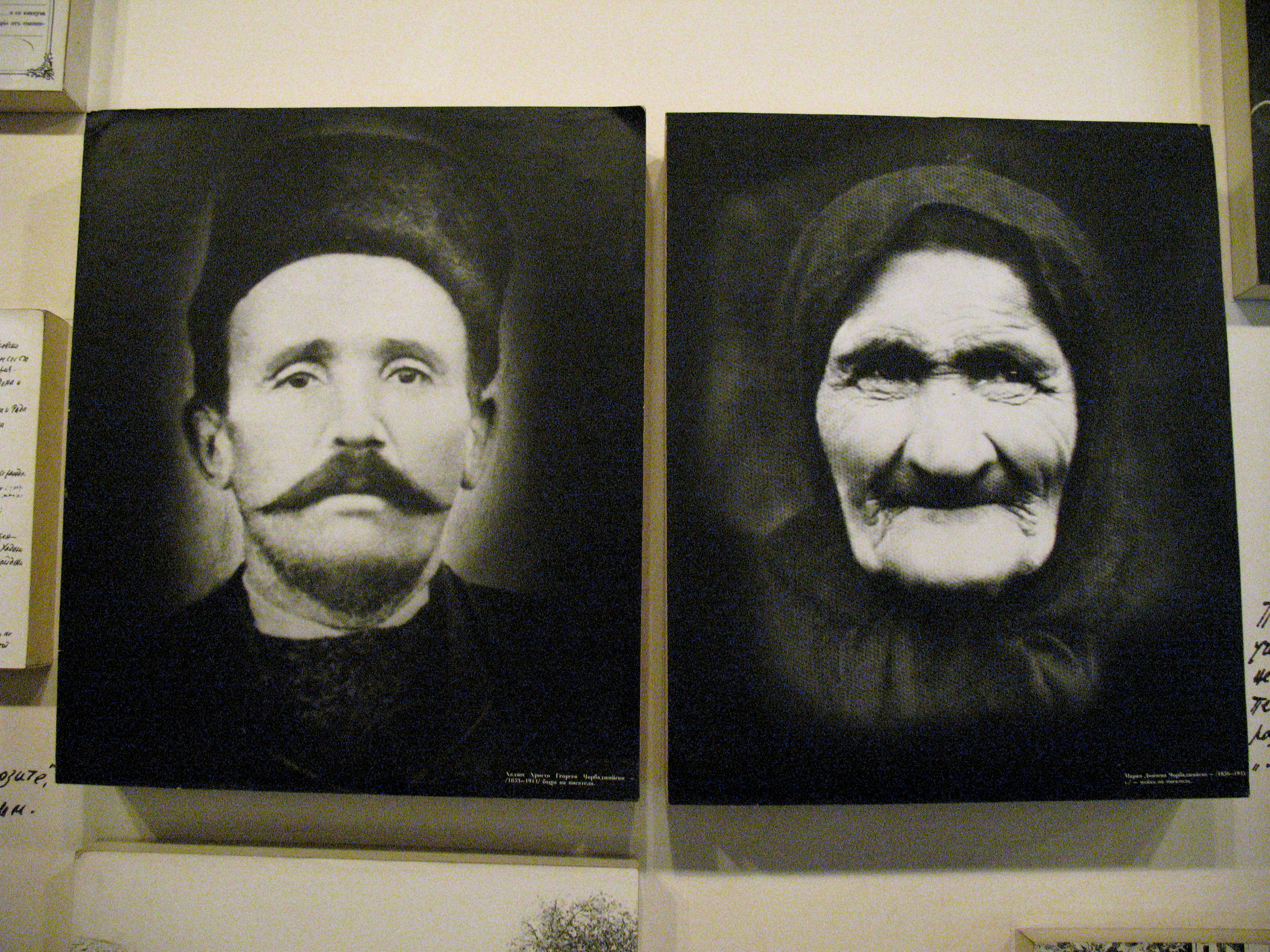
"Chudomir's father and mother“

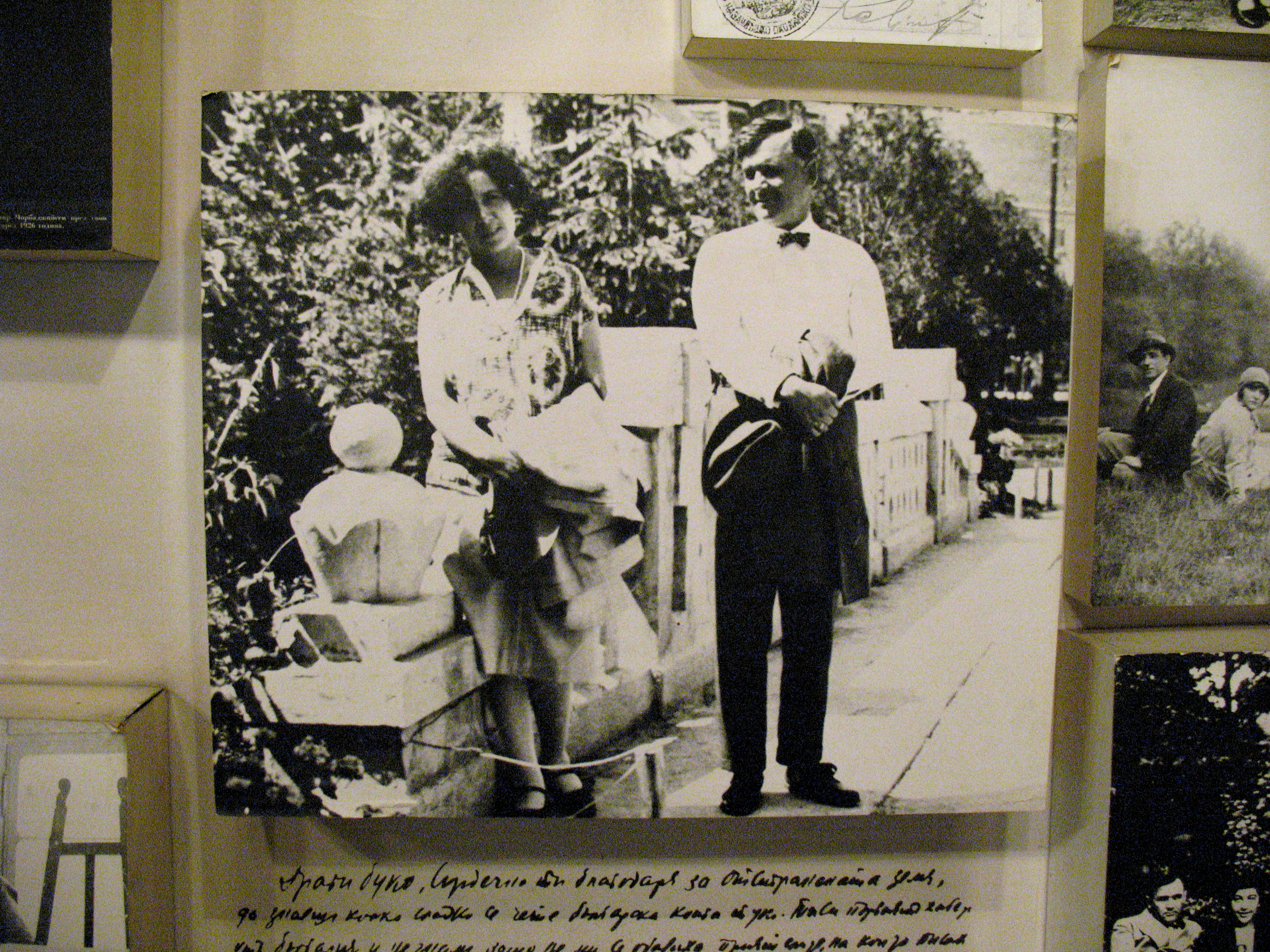
"Chudomir and Mara in Bankia 1929“

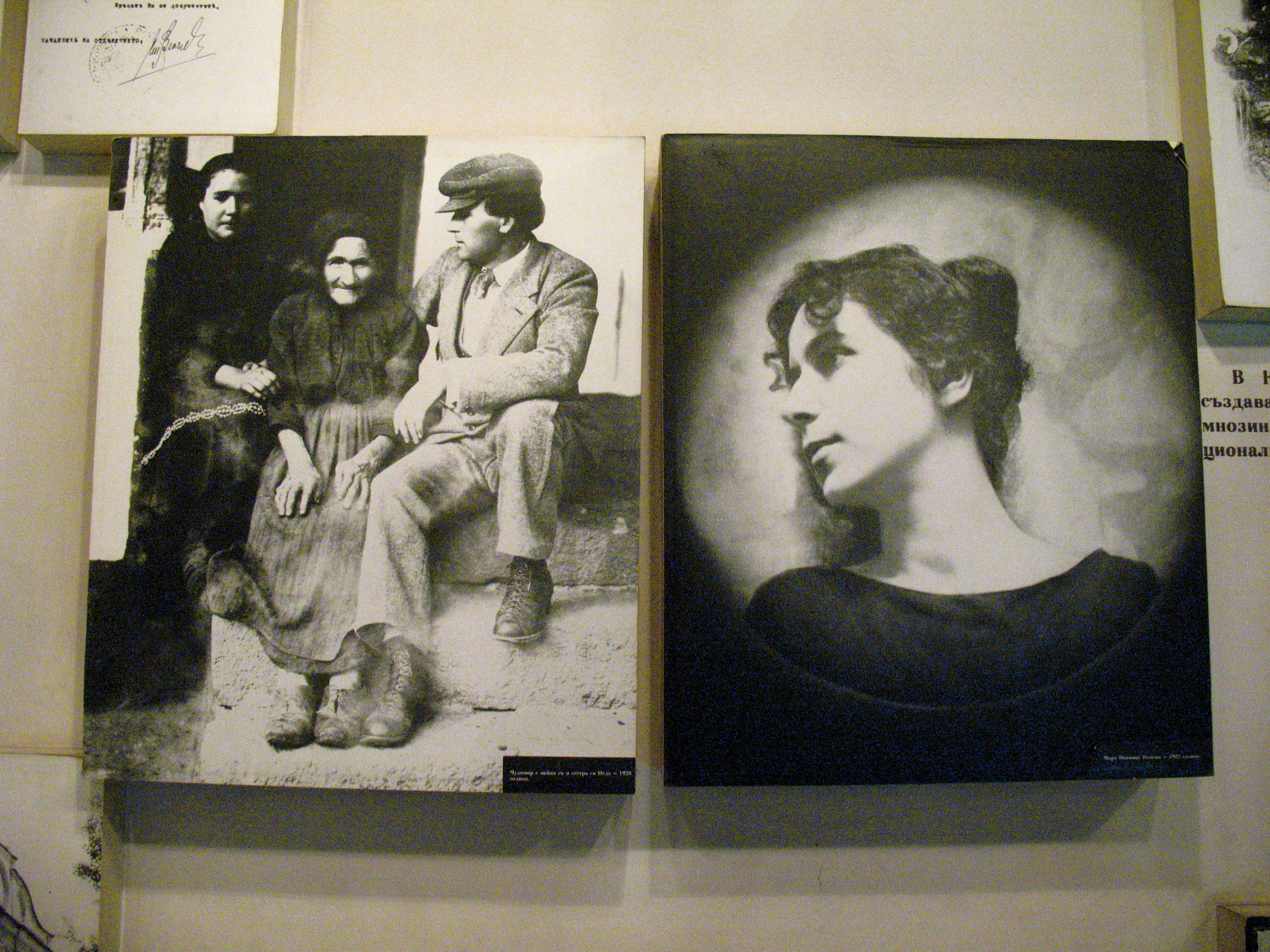
"Neda's sister, mother, Chudomir 1921 - Mara 1921"
