= Detroit Plateau =

Plateau in Antarctica

- Plateau
- Coordinates: 64°10′S 60°0′W
- Location: Trinity Peninsula, Graham Land

The Detroit Plateau (64°10′S 60°0′W) is a major interior plateau of Graham Land on the Antarctic Peninsula, with heights between 1,500 and 1,800 metres (4,900 and 5,900 ft). Its northeast limit is marked by the south wall of Russell West Glacier, from which it extends some 90 nautical miles (170 km; 100 mi) in a general southwest direction to Herbert Plateau.

== Location ==
Trinity Peninsula, Antarctic Peninsula. Detroit Plateau towards south end

The Detroit Plateau is in Graham Land towards the north of the Antarctic Peninsula, partly extending into the Trinity Peninsula. To the south of the Trinity Peninsula it is west of the Danco Coast, south of the Davis Coast and north of the Nordenskjöld Coast. At its south end it joins the much smaller Herbert Plateau. At its north end it is separated from the Louis Philippe Plateau by the Russell West Glacier.

- Copernix satellite view

== Discovery and name ==
The Detroit Plateau was observed from the air by Sir Hubert Wilkins on a flight of December 20, 1928. Wilkins named it Detroit Aviation Society Plateau after the society which aided in the organizing of his expedition, but the shortened form of the original name is approved. The north and east sides of the plateau were charted by the Falkland Islands Dependencies Survey (FIDS) in 1946–47.

== Glaciers ==
Major glaciers flowing from the west side include Russell West Glacier, Pettus Glacier, McNeile Glacier, Sabine Glacier, Sikorsky Glacier, Trepetlika Glacier and Cayley Glacier. Major glaciers flowing from the east side include Victory Glacier, Aitkenhead Glacier, Sjögren Glacier, Eliason Glacier, Polaris Glacier, Pyke Glacier, Albone Glacier, Edgeworth Glacier, Desudava Glacier, Boryana Glacier, Darvari Glacier, Zaychar Glacier, Akaga Glacier, Arrol Icefall, Aleksiev Glacier, Kladorub Glacier, Vrachesh Glacier and Drygalski Glacier.

== Other features ==
Other features, from north to south, include:

=== Kondofrey Heights ===
63°50′00″S 58°34′00″W. Heights that rise to 1,115 metres (3,658 ft) at Skakavitsa Peak, on the southeast side of the Trinity Peninsula, Antarctic Peninsula. Named after the settlement of Kondofrey in western Bulgaria.

=== The Catwalk ===
64°31′S 60°56′W. The very narrow neck of land between Herbert and Detroit Plateaus. Photographed by the FIDASE in 1956-57 and mapped from these photos by the FIDS. So named by the UK-APC in 1960.

== Sources ==
- Alberts, Fred G., ed. (1995), Geographic Names of the Antarctic (PDF) (2 ed.), United States Board on Geographic Names This article incorporates public domain material from websites or documents of the United States Board on Geographic Names.
- Graham Land and South Shetland Islands, BAS: British Antarctic Survey, 2005
- "Kondofrey Heights", Composite Gazetteer of Antarctica, Scientific Committee on Antarctic Research
- Trinity Peninsula (PDF) (Scale 1:250000 topographic map No. 5697), Institut für Angewandte Geodäsie and British Antarctic Survey, 1996, archived from the original (PDF) on 23 September 2015

This article incorporates public domain material from websites or documents of the United States Geological Survey.
