= Pitt Point =

Pitt Point ( 63°50′45″S 58°22′34″W) is a promontory, 90 m high, at the south side of the mouth of Victory Glacier on the south coast of Trinity Peninsula, forming the northeast side of the entrance to Chudomir Cove. The promontory was charted by the Falkland Islands Dependencies Survey (FIDS) in 1945, and named for K.A.J. Pitt, master of the Falkland Islands Company ship Fitzroy, 1940–46, who assisted in establishing FIDS stations, 1944–46.

== Cabral Refuge ==
Cabral Refuge
- Refuge
- Location of Cabral Refuge in Antarctic Peninsula
- Coordinates: 63°50′45″S 58°22′34″W
- Country: Argentina
- Location in Antarctic Peninsula: Pitt point Trinity Peninsula; Antarctica
- Administered by: Argentine Army
- Established: 1964
- Named for: Juan Bautista Cabral
- Type: Seasonal
- Status: Operational

Sargento Cabral Refuge (63°50′45″S 58°22′34″W) is an Antarctic refuge located at Pitt Point, administered by the Argentine Army. The shelter was inaugurated on September 18, 1964, on the occasion of the 1964-1965 Antarctic campaign. It is one of the 18 shelters that are under the responsibility of the Esperanza, which is responsible for the maintenance and the care.

The refuge, currently inactive, bears the name of Juan Bautista Cabral, who died in the Battle of San Lorenzo, while he was aiding then Colonel Don José de San Martín, whose horse had fallen to enemy fire.

== See also ==
- List of Antarctic field camps
