= Bone Bay (Antarctica) =

Bay in Antarctica between Notter Point and Cape Roquemaurel

- Location within Antarctica
- Coordinates: 63°38′S 59°4′W
- Type: Bay

Bone Bay (63°38′S 59°4′W) is a rectangular bay along the northwest coast of Trinity Peninsula, Antarctica. It is nearly 10 nautical miles (19 km; 12 mi) wide at the entrance between Notter Point and Cape Roquemaurel.

== Location ==
Trinity Peninsula on Antarctic Peninsula. Bone Bay at northwest end

Bone Bay is on the north shore of the western end of the Trinity Peninsula, which forms the tip of the Antarctic Peninsula. It is northeast of Charcot Bay, east of the Orléans Strait, south of Astrolabe Island and southwest of Lafond Bay. Russell West Glacier flows into the bay, which is bounded to the south by the Gavin Ice Piedmont.

- Copernix satellite view

== Exploration and name ==
Bone Bay was charted by the Falkland Islands Dependencies Survey (FIDS) in 1948. It was named by the UK Antarctic Place-Names Committee (UK-APC) after Thomas M. Bone, midshipman on the brig Williams used in exploring the South Shetland Islands and Bransfield Strait in 1820.

== Coastal features ==
Coastal features, from west to east, include:

=== Belitsa Peninsula ===
63°44′S 59°14′W. The 13 kilometres (8.1 mi) wide peninsula projecting 8.5 kilometres (5.3 mi) in northwest direction from Trinity Peninsula. Bounded by Bone Bay to the northeast, Charcot Bay to the southwest and Bransfield Strait to the northwest. Trapezoid in form, its west and north extremities are formed by Cape Kjellman and Notter Point respectively. German-British mapping in 1996. Named after the town of Belitsa in Southwestern Bulgaria.

=== Gavin Ice Piedmont ===
63°44′S 59°00′W. An ice piedmont in Trinity Peninsula, about 15 nautical miles (28 km; 17 mi) long and between 3 and 6 nautical miles (5.6 and 11.1 km; 3.5 and 6.9 mi) wide, extending from Charcot Bay to Russell West Glacier. Mapped from surveys by the Falkland Islands Dependencies Survey (FIDS) (1960-61). Named by the UK Antarctic Place-Names Committee (UK-APC) for Christopher B. Gavin-Robinson, pilot of FIDASE (1956-57).

=== Pettus Glacier ===
63°48′S 59°04′W. A narrow deeply entrenched glacier 9 nautical miles (17 km; 10 mi) long, which flows north from Ebony Wall into Gavin Ice Piedmont between Poynter Hill and Tinsel Dome. Named by UK-APC for Robert N. Pettus, aircraft pilot with FIDASE, 1956-57.

=== Notter Point ===
63°40′S 59°11′W. A rocky point 6 nautical miles (11 km; 6.9 mi) northeast of Cape Kjellman marking the west limit of Bone Bay. The name, applied by Argentina in 1953, memorializes Tomás Notter, a commander of English origin in Admiral William Brown's squadron in the struggle for Argentine independence. He died fighting against the Spanish commander Romarate on March 21, 1814 aboard his small vessel Santisima Trinidad, when his vessel grounded under enemy batteries.

=== Wimple Dome ===
63°38′S 58°51′W. Ice-covered hill, 725 metres (2,379 ft) high, standing 2 nautical miles (3.7 km; 2.3 mi) south of Hanson Hill and 2 nautical miles (3.7 km; 2.3 mi) east of Bone Bay on the north side of Trinity Peninsula. The name was applied by members of the FIDS following their survey in 1948 and is descriptive of the shape of the feature, a wimple being a type of headdress worn by nuns.

=== Young Point ===
63°36′S 58°55′W. Rocky point 3 nautical miles (5.6 km; 3.5 mi) south of Cape Roquemaurel at the east side of Bone Bay. Charted by the FIDS in 1948. Named by the UK-APC for Doctor Adam Young, surgeon on the brig Williams which made explorations in the South Shetland Islands and Bransfield Strait in 1820.

=== Cape Roquemaurel ===
63°33′S 58°56′W. Prominent rocky headland at the east side of the entrance to Bone Bay. Discovered by a French expedition, 1837-40, under Captain Jules Dumont d'Urville, and named by him for Lieutenant Louis de Roquemaurel, second-in-command of the expedition ship Astrolabe.

== Islands ==
Rocks and islands in or near the bay, from west to east, include:

=== Beaver Rocks ===
63°40′S 59°21′W. A group of rocks lying 2 nautical miles (3.7 km; 2.3 mi) offshore at a point midway between Notter Point and Cape Kjellman. Named by UK-APC after a type of aircraft used by the British Antarctic Survey.

=== Canso Rocks ===
63°39′S 59°18′W. Two rocks lying west of Bone Bay, 2 nautical miles (3.7 km; 2.3 mi) northwest of Notter Point. Named by UK-APC after one of the types of aircraft used by FIDASE (1955-57).

=== Otter Rock ===
63°38′S 59°12′W. A high distinctive rock lying 3 nautical miles (5.6 km; 3.5 mi) north of Notter Point. Named by UK-APC after the Otter aircraft used by BAS.

=== Whaleback Rocks ===
63°39′S 59°04′W. A group of low rocks lying 2 nautical miles (3.7 km; 2.3 mi) west of Blake Island in Bone Bay, off the north coast of Trinity Peninsula. Charted in 1948 by members of the FIDS who gave this descriptive name.

=== Blake Island ===
63°38′S 59°01′W. A narrow ice-free island 1.5 nautical miles (2.8 km; 1.7 mi) long, lying in Bone Bay. Charted in 1948 by FIDS. Named by UK-APC after Pattrick J. Blake, midshipman on the brig Williams used in exploring the South Shetland Islands and Bransfield Strait in 1820.

=== Boyer Rocks ===
63°35′S 59°00′W. A small group of rocks in the northeast corner of Bone Bay, 3 nautical miles (5.6 km; 3.5 mi) southwest of Cape Roquemaurel. Mapped from surveys by FIDS (1960-61). Named by UK-APC for Joseph Boyer, French naval officer on the Astrolabe during her Antarctic voyage (1837-40).

== Sources ==
- Alberts, Fred G., ed. (1995), Geographic Names of the Antarctic (PDF) (2 ed.), United States Board on Geographic Names This article incorporates public domain material from websites or documents of the United States Board on Geographic Names.
- "Belitsa Peninsula", Composite Gazetteer of Antarctica, Scientific Committee on Antarctic Research
- Graham Land and South Shetland Islands, BAS: British Antarctic Survey, 2005

This article incorporates public domain material from websites or documents of the United States Geological Survey.
