= Prince Gustav Channel =

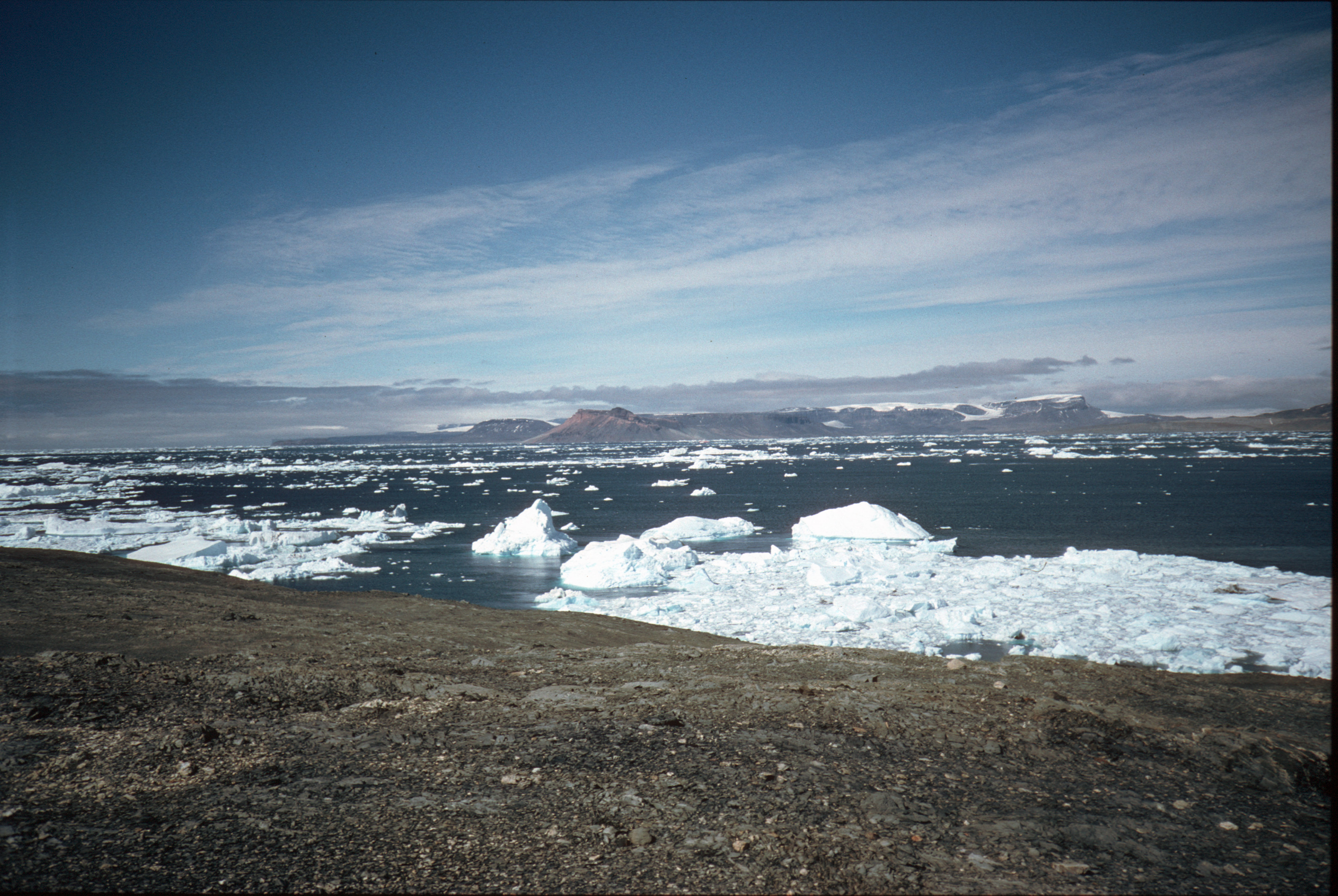
- View of James Ross Island across Prince Gustav Channel from Long Island

- Location within Antarctica
- Location: Graham Land, Antarctica
- Type: Strait

The Prince Gustav Channel (63°50′S 58°15′W) is a strait about 80 nautical miles (150 km; 92 mi) long and from 4 to 15 nautical miles (7.4 to 27.8 km; 4.6 to 17.3 mi) wide, separating James Ross Island and Vega Island from the Trinity Peninsula, Antarctica.

== Location ==
Trinity Peninsula, Antarctic Peninsula. Prince Gustav Channel along southeast coast

Prince Gustav Channel is in Graham Land on the southeast coast of the Trinity Peninsula, which forms the tip of the Antarctic Peninsula. It separates the James Ross Island group to the east from the Trinity Peninsula and Detroit Plateau to the west. It extends north from the Weddell Sea and turns east to the Erebus and Terror Gulf. The southern entrance is between Cape Longing on the Longing Peninsula and Cape Foster on James Ross Island. Further north it extends past Röhss Bay and other smaller bays on James Ross Island, and past the Cugnot Ice Piedmont on the mainland. It passes Herbert Sound, which leads south between James Ross Island and Vega Island, passes south of the Eagle Island group, and opens onto the Erebus and Terror Gulf between Cape Gordon on Vega Island and Cape Green on the Tabarin Peninsula.

== Discovery and name ==
The Prince Gustav Channel was discovered in October 1903 by the Swedish Antarctic Expedition (SwedAE) under Otto Nordenskjöld, who named it for Crown Prince Gustav of Sweden (later King Gustav V) of Sweden.

== Prince Gustav Ice Shelf ==
Prince Gustav Ice Shelf 64°15'S, 58°30'W An ice shelf of more than 15 mi extent occupying the S part of Prince Gustav Channel, including Rohss Bay, James Ross Island. Named by the UK Antarctic Place-Names Committee (UK-APC) in 1990 in association with the channel.

On 27 February 1995, the British Antarctic Survey (BAS) reported that the ice shelf formerly blocking the channel had disintegrated. This ice shelf had spanned approximately 700 square kilometres (270 sq mi) prior to its disintegration. In the area previously covered by the shelf, the channel's water depth is between 600 and 800 metres (2,000 and 2,600 ft). Between February and March 2000, scientists collected sediment cores 5 to 6 m in length from the ocean floor. Carbon dating of organic material found in the sediment layers suggested that for a period between 2,000 and 5,000 years ago, much of the channel was seasonally open water. While icebergs were able to navigate the channel, ice rafted debris was deposited within the sediment.

Prince Gustav Ice Shelf retreated in the mid-Holocene period 5000 to 2000 years before present, [this] "corresponds to regional climate warming deduced from other paleoenvironmental records." It appears that before and after this period, the channel remained closed. The period when the channel was open coincides with a period of local warming supported by data gathered from land-based studies of lake sediments and ancient, abandoned penguin rookeries. With the return of colder conditions about 1900 years ago, the Prince Gustav Ice Shelf reformed until its recent retreat and collapse.

== San Nicolás Refuge ==
The San Nicolás Refuge (Spanish: Refugio San Nicolás, 63°39′20″S 57°49′46″W) is an Argentine Antarctic refuge located on the north coast of the entrance to the Prince Gustav Channel, on the Trinity Peninsula, at the northern tip of the Antarctic Peninsula. The refuge is administered by the Argentine Army and was inaugurated on 12 September 1963. It is one of the 18 shelters that are under the responsibility of the Esperanza Base, which is responsible for the maintenance and the care. The Argentine Antarctic Program reports that the refuge is inactive.

== Glaciers ==
64°03′S 58°50′W. A narrow straight glacier, 10 nautical miles (19 km; 12 mi) long, flowing eastward from Detroit Plateau into Prince Gustav Channel 5 nautical miles (9.3 km; 5.8 mi) south of Alectoria Island. Mapped from surveys by the Falkland Islands Dependencies Survey (FIDS) (1960–61). Named by the UK Antarctic Place-Names Committee (UK-APC) for Bramah J. Diplock, British engineer who made considerable advances in the design of chain-track tractors (1885–1913).

=== Sjögren Glacier ===
64°14′S 59°00′W. A glacier 15 nautical miles (28 km; 17 mi) long in the south part of Trinity Peninsula, flowing southeast from Detroit Plateau to the south side of Mount Wild where it enters Prince Gustav Channel. Discovered in 1903 by the SwedAE under Otto Nordenskjöld. He named it Hj. Sjögren Fiord after a patron of the expedition. The true nature of the feature was determined by the FIDS in 1945.

=== Aitkenhead Glacier ===
63°57′S 58°44′W. Glacier about 10 nautical miles (19 km; 12 mi) long, flowing east-southeast from the Detroit Plateau, Graham Land, to Prince Gustav Channel close north of Alectoria Island. Mapped from surveys by FIDS (1960–61). Named by UK-APC for Neil Aitkenhead, FIDS geologist at Hope Bay (1959–60).

=== Victory Glacier ===
63°49′S 58°25′W. A gently sloping glacier, 8 nautical miles (15 km; 9.2 mi) long, flowing east-southeast from the north end of Detroit Plateau on Trinity Peninsula to Prince Gustav Channel immediately north of Pitt Point. Surveyed by the FIDS, and so named because the glacier was sighted in the week following the surrender of Japan in World War II, in August 1945.

=== Russell East Glacier ===
63°44′S 58°20′W. A glacier, 6 nautical miles (11 km; 6.9 mi) long and 3 nautical miles (5.6 km; 3.5 mi) wide, which lies at the north end of Detroit Plateau and flows from Mount Canicula eastward into Prince Gustav Channel. This glacier together with Russell West Glacier, which flows westward into Bone Bay on the north side of Trinity Peninsula, form a through glacier across the north part of Antarctic Peninsula. It was first surveyed in 1946 by the FIDS. Named by the UK-APC for V.I. Russell, surveyor and leader of the FIDS base at Hope Bay in 1946.

== Islands ==
=== Alectoria Island ===
63°59′S 58°37′W. A low, nearly ice-free island less than 1 nautical mile (1.9 km; 1.2 mi) long. It lies in Prince Gustav Channel, about 0.5 nautical miles (0.93 km; 0.58 mi) off the terminus of Aitkenhead Glacier. Surveyed in 1945 by the FIDS, who named it after the lichen Alectoria which was predominant on the island at the time.

=== Carlson Island ===
63°53′S 58°16′W. Rocky island 1 nautical mile (1.9 km; 1.2 mi) long and 300 metres (980 ft) high, lying in Prince Gustav Channel 3 nautical miles (5.6 km; 3.5 mi) southeast of Pitt Point, Trinity Peninsula. Discovered in 1903 by the SwedAE under Otto Nordenskjöld, who named it for Wilhelm Carlson, one of the chief patrons of the expedition.

=== Long Island ===
63°46′S 58°12′W. An island 3 nautical miles (5.6 km; 3.5 mi) long, in a northeast–southwest direction, and 0.5 nautical miles (0.93 km; 0.58 mi) wide, lying opposite the mouth of Russell East Glacier and 2 nautical miles (3.7 km; 2.3 mi) south of Trinity Peninsula in Prince Gustav Channel. Discovered and named by the FIDS in 1945. The name is descriptive.

=== Red Island ===
63°44′S 57°52′W. Circular, flat-topped island, 1 nautical mile (1.9 km; 1.2 mi) in diameter and 495 metres (1,624 ft) high, with reddish cliffs of volcanic rock, lying 3.5 nautical miles (6.5 km; 4.0 mi) northwest of Cape Lachman, James Ross Island, in Prince Gustav Channel. Discovered and named by the SwedAE under Otto Nordenskjöld, 1901-04.

=== The Monument ===
63°44′S 57°53′W. A rock pillar rising to 495 metres (1,624 ft) high on Red Island in Prince Gustav Channel. The feature was sighted by the SwedAE under Otto Nordenskjöld, 1901-04. It was surveyed and named descriptively by the FIDS in 1945.

== Sources ==
- Alberts, Fred G., ed. (1995), Geographic Names of the Antarctic (PDF) (2 ed.), United States Board on Geographic Names This article incorporates public domain material from websites or documents of the United States Board on Geographic Names.
- Graham Land and South Shetland Islands, BAS: British Antarctic Survey, 2005
- Intercambio de información 3.2.1. ESTACIONES D. REFUGIOS., Dirección Nacional del Antártico, archived from the original on 2013-05-17

This article incorporates public domain material from websites or documents of the United States Geological Survey.
