= Polar Geospatial Center =

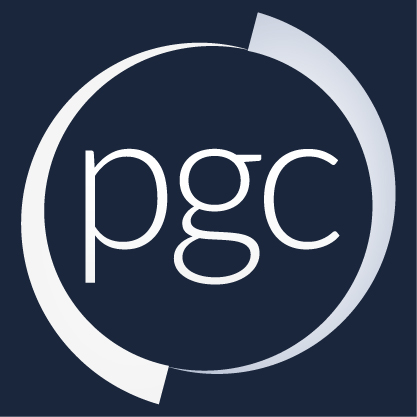
- Abbreviation: PGC
- Formation: 2007
- Type: Polar Research
- Location: Saint Paul, Minnesota
- Coordinates: 44°59′04″N 93°10′56″W
- Website: www.pgc.umn.edu
- Formerly called: Antarctic Geospatial Information Center

The Polar Geospatial Center is a research center at the University of Minnesota's College of Science and Engineering funded by the National Science Foundation's Office of Polar Programs. Founded in 2007, the Polar Geospatial Center "provides geospatial support, mapping, and GIS/remote sensing solutions to researchers and logistics groups in the polar science community." It is currently directed by Paul Morin.

== History ==
The Polar Geospatial Center (PGC) was founded in 2007 and was originally called the Antarctic Geospatial Information Center (AGIC). In its early days, the AGIC's goal was to provide basic mapping and GIS services for the United States Antarctic Program (USAP), and was only a two-man project. As time went on, the program's credibility and size expanded. By 2010, the program had over a half dozen team members. In March 2011, the program was "classified as a National Science Foundation cooperative agreement" and adapted to take responsibility for Arctic as well as Antarctic operations, hence the name change to PGC.

== Services ==
The PGC's current goal is to support federally funded researchers in the Arctic and Antarctic. The PGC utilizes geospatial and remote sensing technology to work with research teams and solve problems. Some specific examples of services are listed below.

=== Image delivery & analysis ===
The PGC has a large collection of both satellite imagery as well as aerial photography at various resolutions. The PGC provides commercial satellite imagery for United States federally-funded polar researchers.

=== Digital Elevation Models ===
The PGC provides high-resolution digital elevation models (DEMs) derived from stereoscopic optical imagery. The ArcticDEM project, an 8-meter posting pan-Arctic DEM, was announced by then-President Barack Obama on September 3, 2015. ArcticDEM has already been successfully applied to automatically explore and classify glacial landforms.

=== Custom map requests ===
The PGC employs individuals skilled in cartography and GIS to create custom maps of areas for researchers preparing to head into the field.

=== Map collection ===
The PGC Map Catalog hosts thousands of Antarctic and Arctic maps in digital form. These maps are from many different organizations and periods in time. Many of these maps are publicly available, some are not and may be provided upon request.
