= Reference Elevation Model of Antarctica =

The Reference Elevation Model of Antarctica (REMA) is a digital elevation model (DEM) that covers almost the entire continent of Antarctica at a resolution of less than 10 m.

== Model ==
REMA uses stereophotogrammetry to provide high-quality surface measurements of the surface of the ice sheet that covers most of the continent, despite the low contrast of the satellite images. Elements of the mosaic include an error estimate and a time stamp, so changes in the ice or snow surface can be measured. Absolute uncertainty should be less than 1 meter, and relative uncertainties should be in decimeters. The satellite images have pixel ground resolutions of under 0.5 meters, and overlapping images from different angles can be used to extract elevation data for DEMs. Based only on satellite position, there may be errors of several meters, but through ground control registration these can be reduced to point-to-point errors of 20 centimeters or less, comparable in accuracy to airborne lidar.

Most of the initial data was collected over the austral summer seasons of 2015 and 2016. The model is updated with new DEM strips twice per year. Derived mosaic products are added as they become available.

== Data sources and licensing ==
REMA was built using stereoscopic imagery from the WorldView-1, WorldView-2, WorldView-3 and GeoEye-1 satellites, operated by DigitalGlobe. The images are distributed by the Polar Geospatial Center at the University of Minnesota College of Science and Engineering under a scientific use licensing agreement with the United States National Geospatial-Intelligence Agency. The stereopair images were processed by software developed at the Ohio State University to create DEMs using the Blue Waters supercomputer at the National Center for Supercomputing Applications at the University of Illinois Urbana-Champaign. The images are available only to US federally funded investigators, but the derived products, including DEMs, are distributed openly.

== REMA Explorer ==
The Polar Geospatial Center supports a REMA Explorer application that lets public users browse the data online. They can enter coordinates or a place name to zoom in on a small area, and choose different renderings such as hill shades, elevation tinted, contour. They can obtain information about any point of the ice surface, including resolution, aspect, slope, ellipsoid height and orthometric height.

== Sources ==
- Kel Elkins (March 18, 2022), The Reference Elevation Model of Antarctica (REMA), NASA Scientific Visualization Studio
- "Reference Elevation Model of Antarctica (REMA)", Registry of Open Data on AWS
- REMA, University of Minnesota Polar Geospatial Center
- REMA Explorer, PGC Polar Geospatial Center
- Howat, Ian M.; Porter, Claire; Smith, Benjamin E.; Noh, Myoung-Jong; Morin, Paul (2019), "The Reference Elevation Model of Antarctica", The Cryosphere (Creative Commons Attribution 4.0 License), 13 (2), Copernicus Publications on behalf of the European Geosciences Union: 665–674, Bibcode:2019TCry...13..665H, doi:10.5194/tc-13-665-2019
