= Composite Gazetteer of Antarctica =

Authoritative international gazetteer containing all the Antarctic toponyms

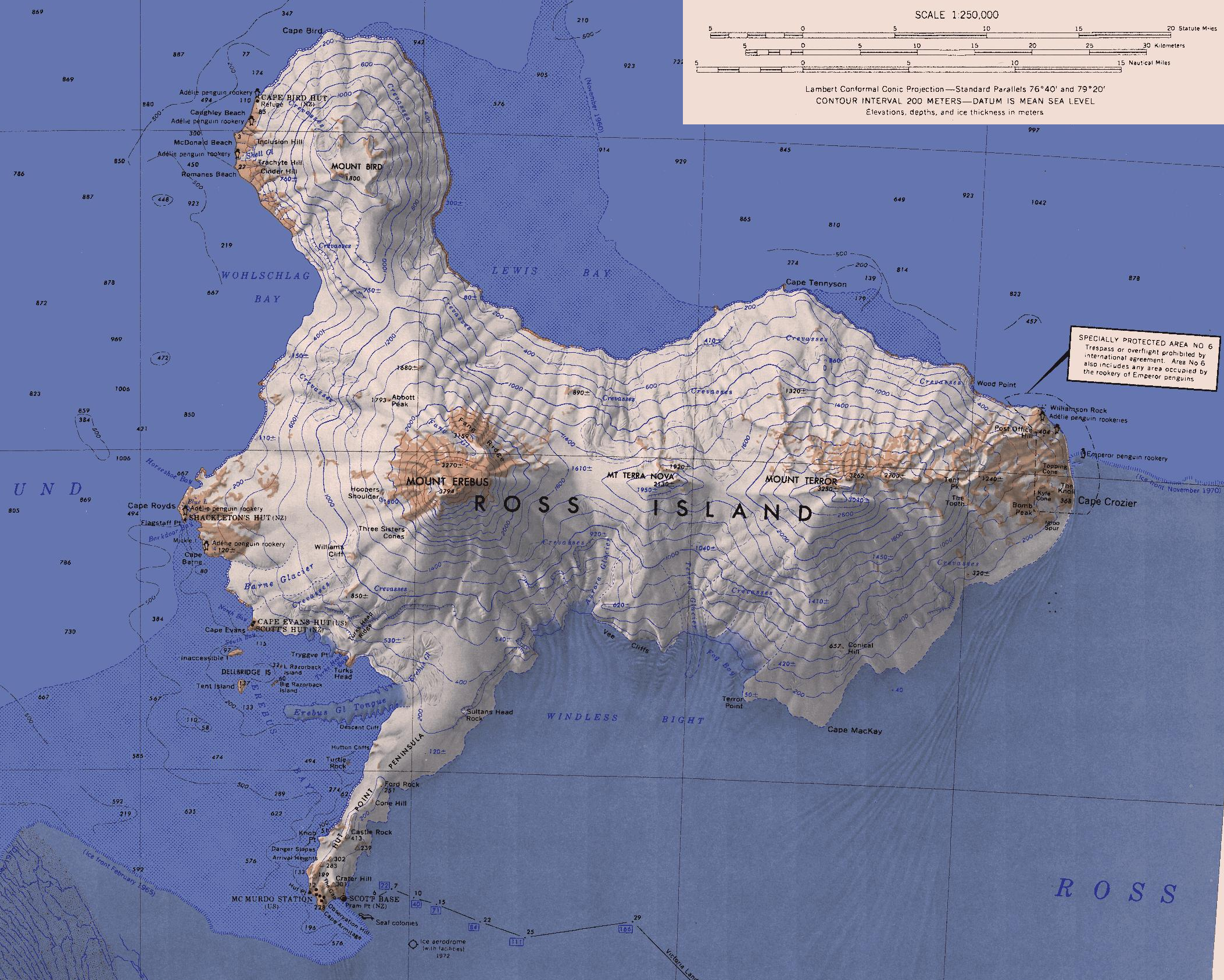
Place names from the Composite Antarctic Gazetteer on a topographic map of Ross Island

Place names from the Composite Antarctic Gazetteer on a topographic map of Sentinel Range, Ellsworth Mountains

Place names of diverse national origins from the Composite Antarctic Gazetteer on a topographic map of the South Shetland Islands

The Composite Gazetteer of Antarctica (CGA) of the Scientific Committee on Antarctic Research (SCAR) is the authoritative international gazetteer containing all Antarctic toponyms published in national gazetteers, plus basic information about those names and the relevant geographical features. The Gazetteer includes also parts of the International Hydrographic Organization (IHO) General Bathymetric Chart of the Oceans (GEBCO) gazetteer for under-sea features situated south of 60° south latitude.

As of May 2019, the overall content of the CGA amounts to 37,893 geographic names for 19,803 features including some 500 features with two or more entirely different names, contributed by the following sources:

Country	Names
United States	13,192
United Kingdom	5,040
Russia	4,808
New Zealand	2,597
Australia	2,551
Argentina	2,545
Chile	1,866
Norway	1,706
Bulgaria	1,450
Germany	393
Poland	365
China	359
Japan	345
France	223
GEBCO	182
Belgium	117
Italy	53
Spain	35
South Korea	27
India	21
Ecuador	9
Uruguay	5
South Africa	2
Canada	2
Ukraine	1

== National Authorities for Antarctic place-names ==
Country / Official authority

- Argentina: Instituto Geográfico Nacional, Servicio de Hidrografía Naval
- Australia: Australian Antarctic Names and Medals Committee
- Bulgaria: Antarctic Place-names Commission
- Canada: Geographical Names Board of Canada
- Chile: Instituto Hidrográfíco y Oceanográfico de la Armada de Chile (SHOA) and Instituto Geográfico Militar (IGM)
- China: Chinese Place-names Committee
- France: Commission de Toponymie des TAAF, Institut Géographique National (Commission of Toponymy of TAAF, National Geographic Institute)
- Germany: Ständiger Ausschuß für Geographische Namen (Permanent committee on geographical names)
- Italy: Comitato per i nomi geografici antartici (Antarctic geographic names Committee)
- Japan: Antarctic Place-names Committee of Japan
- New Zealand: Antarctic Place-names Committee of New Zealand
- Norway: Antarctic Place-names Committee of Norway, Norsk Polarinstitutt
- Poland: Committee of Polar Research of the Polish Academy of Sciences
- Russia: Russian Interministerial Commission on Geographical Names
- UK: British Antarctic Survey UK Antarctic Place-names Committee
- Uruguay: Instituto Antártico Uruguayo
- United States: United States Board on Geographic Names
- GEBCO: GEBCO Sub-Committee on Undersea Feature Names
