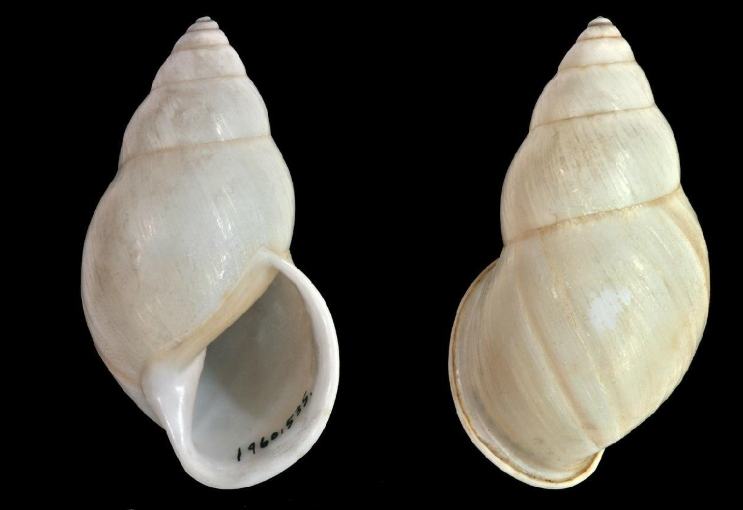
- Shell of Amphidromus maculiferus maculiferus (lectotype at the Natural History Museum, London)

Scientific classification
- Kingdom: Animalia
- Phylum: Mollusca
- Class: Gastropoda
- Order: Stylommatophora
- Family: Camaenidae
- Genus: Amphidromus
- Species: A. maculiferus

Binomial name
- Amphidromus maculiferus (G. B. Sowerby I, 1838)

Synonyms
- Bulimus maculiferus (G. B. Sowerby I, 1838); Bulinus maculiferus Broderip, 1841 (junior objective synonym and homonym); Bulinus maculiferus G. B. Sowerby I, 1838 superseded combination

= Amphidromus maculiferus =

Species of gastropod

Amphidromus maculiferus is a species of air-breathing land snail, a terrestrial pulmonate gastropod mollusc in the family Camaenidae.

Subspecies

- Amphidromus maculiferus apoensis Bartsch, 1917
- Amphidromus maculiferus maculiferus (G. B. Sowerby I, 1838)
- Amphidromus maculiferus malindangensis Bartsch, 1917

== Description ==
The length of the shell attains 63.5 mm, its diameter 28.5 mm.

(Original description in Latin) The shell is usually sinistral and elongate-pyramidal. It comprises six somewhat ventricose (swollen) whorls, with the body whorl appearing much the largest. The surface exhibits oblique longitudinal striations formed by growth lines. The aperture presents an ovate shape, and the outer lip appears somewhat outwardly spreading, reflected, and is white.

== Distribution ==
The type species was found on Mindanao Island, the Philippines and Sabah, Malaysia.

== Synonyms ==
- Amphidromus maculiferus bartschi Laidlaw & Solem, 1961 : synonym of Amphidromus buluanensis Bartsch, 1917 (junior subjective synonym)
- Amphidromus maculiferus boholensis Bartsch, 1917: synonym of Amphidromus multicolor boholensis Bartsch, 1917 (basionym)
- Amphidromus maculiferus buluanensis Bartsch, 1917: synonym of Amphidromus buluanensis Bartsch, 1917 (superseded rank)
- Amphidromus maculiferus cataganensis Bartsch, 1917: synonym of Amphidromus maculiferus malindangensis Bartsch, 1917
- Amphidromus maculiferus cosmius Bartsch, 1917: synonym of Amphidromus chloris (Reeve, 1848): synonym of Amphidromus sulphuratus (Hombron & Jacquinot, 1847)
- Forma Amphidromus maculiferus f. buluanensis Bartsch, 1917: synonym of Amphidromus buluanensis Bartsch, 1917 (superseded rank)
- Amphidromus maculiferus gracilior Fulton, 1896: synonym of Amphidromus multicolor gracilior Fulton, 1896 (superseded combination)
- Amphidromus maculiferus inflatus Fulton, 1896: synonym of Amphidromus inflatus Fulton, 1896
- Amphidromus maculiferus multicolor Möllendorff, 1893: synonym of Amphidromus multicolor Möllendorff, 1893 (basionym)
- Amphidromus maculiferus obscura Fulton, 1896: synonym of Amphidromus maculiferus maculiferus (G. B. Sowerby I, 1838) (junior subjective synonym)
- Amphidromus maculiferus samarensis Bartsch, 1917: synonym of Amphidromus multicolor samarensis Bartsch, 1917 (basionym)
- Amphidromus maculiferus strigatus Fulton, 1896: synonym of Amphidromus multicolor gracilior Fulton, 1896 (junior synonym)
- Amphidromus maculiferus var. gracilior Fulton, 1896: synonym of Amphidromus multicolor gracilior Fulton, 1896 (basionym)
- Amphidromus maculiferus var. gracillimus Kobelt, 1914: synonym of Amphidromus multicolor gracilior Fulton, 1896 (junior subjective synonym)
- Amphidromus maculiferus var. inflatus Fulton, 1896: synonym of Amphidromus inflatus Fulton, 1896 (basionym)
- Amphidromus maculiferus var. obscura Fulton, 1896: synonym of Amphidromus maculiferus maculiferus (G. B. Sowerby I, 1838)
- Amphidromus maculiferus var. strigata Fulton, 1896: synonym of Amphidromus multicolor gracilior Fulton, 1896
- Amphidromus maculiferus webbi Bartsch, 1919: synonym of Amphidromus maculiferus bartschi Laidlaw & Solem, 1961: synonym of Amphidromus buluanensis Bartsch, 1917 (invalid: junior homonym of Amphidromus webbi Fulton, 1907; A. bartschi is a replacement name)
