= Charles Thanaron =

French frigate captain (1809–1886)

- Charles Jules Adolphe Thanaron
- Born: July 7, 1809; Toulon, Var, France
- Died: May 21, 1886 (aged 76); Toulon, Var, France
- Occupation: Officer in the French Navy
- Years active: 1824-1856
- Employer: French Navy
- Known for: Thanaron Point (63°30′S 58°40′W)
- Notable work: Member of the Dumont d'Urville second expedition
- Title: Capitaine de frégate (1850)
- Spouse(s): Marie Joséphine Louise Sazerac de Forge, daughter of Jean-Baptiste Sazerac de Forge, mayor of Angoulême in 1830, deputy of Charente in 1849, and Catherine Justine Lafargue du Tauzia
- Parents: Paul Thanaron (1773-1861), Capitaine de frégate (father); Marie-Anne-Joséphine Mainard (mother)
- Relatives: Charles Jacquinot's cousin
- Awards: Knight of the Legion of Honour

Charles Jules Adolphe Thanaron (born in Toulon on July 7, 1809, and died in the same city on May 21, 1886) was a Capitaine de frégate in the French Navy, member of the Dumont d'Urville second expedition.

== Biography ==
Charles Thanaron was born into a family of sailors. His father Paul (1773-1861) was himself a capitaine de vaisseau. He was forced to retire in 1816 by Louis XVIII on his return from Ghent. Friend of Vice-Admiral Ange René Armand, baron de Mackau, future Minister of the Navy, he thought he could expect a benevolent protection for his son's maritime career His mother, Marie-Anne-Joséphine Mainard, from Toulon, was the aunt of Charles Hector Jacquinot's wife.

Charles Thanaron married Marie Joséphine Louise Sazerac de Forge, daughter of Jean-Baptiste Sazerac de Forge, mayor of Angoulême in 1830, deputy of Charente in 1849, and Catherine Justine Lafargue du Tauzia.

== Military career ==
In 1824, at the age of 15, he entered the Royal Navy College in Angoulême, where he was soon noticed for his wit, as evidenced by the many reports he was the subject of.

Student of 2nd class on September 20, 1826, 1st class on September 1, 1828 he embarked on the corvette Victorieuse. During the four years that followed, he alternated no less than ten embarkations, with periods ashore in Toulon. Promoted ensign on December 31, 1830, he embarked on the brig Du Couëdic with which he participated in the French conquest of Algeria and where he met ensign Gaston Rocquemaurel, future second in command of the Astrolabe. In 1832, he embarked on the corvette Isis.

On April 10, 1837, he was appointed Lieutenant de vaisseau. The same year, he presented his candidacy for a place in the Dumont d'Urville second expedition. He had a major asset, he was the cousin of Commander Charles Jacquinot, who took him on board the corvette Zélée as second lieutenant.

During this expedition, Thanaron was often in charge of hydrographic surveys. In this capacity, he was in charge of the plan of Voces Bay (Strait of Magellan). He accomplished his work with competence and was decorated with the Legion of Honor on the return of the expedition on January 25, 1841.

From 1841 to 1845, he was second in command of the liner Trident. Then, from 1846 to 1848, he was second in command of the steam frigate Infernal, then commander of the same ship on a temporary basis for four months. It was another rare fact for a lieutenant of a ship to be in command of the same ship for four months. In January 1850, he left for Africa and ordered, still provisionally, the steam-powered aviso Chimère. Promoted to Capitaine de frégate on October 21, 1850, he received the titular command of another steamboat aviso the Cerbère.

Around March 1854, Jacquinot, who became Rear Admiral in the Maritime Prefecture of Toulon, took him on his personal staff, a position he held until his retirement in 1856.

== Distinctions ==
- Knight of the Legion of Honour on 25 January 1841

== Legacy ==
- Dumont d'Urville gave the name of Thanaron Point to a point (63°30′S 58°40′W) located at Hanson Hill 4 nautical miles (7 km) southeast of Cape Roquemaurel (63°33′S 58°56′W) and 3 km (2 miles) west-northwest of Zanoge Hill on the Trinity Peninsula of Graham Land. in Antarctica.
