= Jacquinot =

Jacquinot (English: /ʒækɪˈnoʊ/, French: [ʒakino]) is a French surname. Notable people with the surname include:

- Charles Jacquinot (1796–1879), French admiral and Antarctic explorer
- Honoré Jacquinot (1815–1887), French surgeon and zoologist, brother of Charles-Hector
- Louis Jacquinot (1898–1993), French lawyer and politician, several times minister
- Robert Jacquinot (1893–1980), French road racing cyclist
- Robert Jacquinot de Besange (1878–1946), French Jesuit

== See also ==
- Jacquinot Bay, bay in East New Britain Province
  - Jacquinot Bay Airport
- Jacquinot Rocks, in Antarctica, named after Honoré Jacquinot
- Mount Jacquinot, in Antarctica, named after Charles Jacquinot
