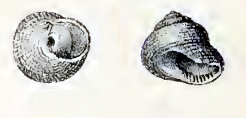
- Drawing showing two views of a shell of Clanculus microdon

Scientific classification
- Kingdom: Animalia
- Phylum: Mollusca
- Class: Gastropoda
- Subclass: Vetigastropoda
- Order: Trochida
- Superfamily: Trochoidea
- Family: Trochidae
- Genus: Clanculus
- Species: C. microdon

Binomial name
- Clanculus microdon A. Adams, 1853

Synonyms
- Trochus microdon A. Adams, 1853

= Clanculus microdon =

Species of gastropod

Clanculus microdon is a species of sea snail, a marine gastropod mollusk in the family Trochidae, the top snails.

The variety Clanculus microdon var. ater Pilsbry, 1901 is accepted as Clanculus ater Pilsbry, 1901.

== Description ==
The size of the shell attains 17 mm. The thick, solid shell has a depressed conoidal shape. It is of a reddish-brown hue, interstices between the ribs, chocolate colored, above marked with a few broad yellowish or flesh-tinted maculations radiating from the sutures toward, but not quite reaching the periphery, which with the base, has the ribs sparsely dotted with white. The spire is low-conic with a roseate apex. The suture is distinct and not canaliculate. The five whorls are moderately convex. They are encircled by lirae more or less distinctly granulate, very unequal in size, numbering about 14 on the body whorl. The interstices are closely obliquely striate, and usually bearing a minute central riblet. The body whorl descends anteriorly and is rounded at the periphery. The base of the shell is convex, with revolving lirae more superficially and much more closely cut into granules than those of the upper surface, and also broader, flatter, and equal in size. These number 6 to 7, one or two around the umbilicus. The umbilicus is white, dotted with yellow or reddish, the remainder reddish-brown, sparsely articulated on the ribs with white, sometimes radiately marked with narrow white stripes. The oblique aperture is somewhat contracted and subcircular. The outer and basal lips are thickened and finely crenulated within. The columella is oblique, with a tooth-like fold above, solute, and deeply inserted upon the side of the umbilicus The middle portion is concave, with a reflexed subdenticulate edge, ending beneath in a minute denticle. The profound umbilicus is smooth and polished within, bordered by a strong rib bearing 6 or 7 projecting white teeth, the upper one the largest.

This is a species belonging to the group of C. atropurpureus, C. bathyrhaphe, etc., including species in which the base of the columella is scarcely toothed, but passes into the basal margin in a regular curve, bearing several subequal denticles. The columella above is inserted upon the side of the umbilicus instead of in the center of the axis as in the typical Clanculus (Clanculopsis) Monterosato, 1880. From Clanculus atropurpureus, which seems to be its nearest ally, Clanculus microdon differs in the larger size, variegated coloration, and irregularity of the spiral ribs on the upper surface.

== Distribution ==
This species occurs off the Andaman Islands, Japan and the Philippines.
