= Louis Philippe Plateau =

Plateau in Antarctica

- Plateau
- Coordinates: 63°36′S 58°21′W
- Location: Trinity Peninsula, Graham Land

The Louis Philippe Plateau (63°36′S 58°21′W) is a plateau, about 11 nautical miles (20 km; 13 mi) long and 5 nautical miles (9.3 km; 5.8 mi) wide, which rises to 1,370 metres (4,490 ft) and occupies the central part of Trinity Peninsula, Antarctica, between Russell West Glacier and Windy Gap.

== Location ==
Trinity Peninsula, Antarctic Peninsula. Louis Philippe Plateau towards the southwest

The Louis Philippe Plateau is in Graham Land in the central spine of the Trinity Peninsula, which forms the tip of the Antarctic Peninsula. Marescot Ridge and Lafond Bay are to the north, Broad Valley and the Laclavère Plateau are to the east, the Cugnot Ice Piedmont and Russell East Glacier are to the south and Russell West Glacier and Srednogorie Heights are to the west. Features include Allen Knoll, Benz Pass, Windy Gap and Mount D'Urville.

== Name ==
The name, recommended by the UK Antarctic Place-Names Committee (UK-APC) in 1948, commemorates Captain Jules Dumont d'Urville's 1838 exploration of the Trinity Peninsula area, which he had named "Terre Louis Philippe," after Louis Philippe I, the King of France at the time.

== Western features ==
Western features include, from west to east:

=== Trajan Gate ===
63°36′30″S 58°35′30″W. A flat saddle with elevation about 850 metres (2,790 ft) high extending 4.3 kilometres (2.7 mi), which is situated between Malorad Glacier to the north and Russell West Glacier to the south. Linking Mount Ignatiev and Srednogorie Heights to the west, and Louis-Philippe Plateau to the east. Named after the Gate of Trajan mountain pass in Western Bulgaria.

=== Prelez Gap ===
63°34′30″S 58°32′00″W. A flat ice-covered saddle of elevation 793 metres (2,602 ft) high, which links Marescot Ridge to the northwest to Louis-Philippe Plateau to the southeast. Overlooking the upper course of Malorad Glacier to the west. Named after the settlement of Prelez in Northeastern Bulgaria.

=== Huhla Col ===
63°34′47″S 58°29′14″W. An ice-covered col of elevation over 1,131 metres (3,711 ft) high that links Snegotin Ridge to the north to the west part of Louis-Philippe Plateau to the south. Overlooking Prelez Gap and Malorad Glacier to the west-northwest. Named after the settlement of Huhla in Southern Bulgaria.

=== Snegotin Ridge ===
63°33′40″S 58°27′50″W. An ice-covered ridge rising to 1,230 metres (4,040 ft) high on the northwest side of Louis-Philippe Plateau. Extending 6.5 kilometres (4.0 mi) in southwest–northeast direction and 4 kilometres (2.5 mi) wide, and linked to the south to Louis-Philippe Plateau by Huhla Col. Named after the settlement of Snegotin in Southern Bulgaria.

=== Lardigo Peak ===
63°33′42″S 58°28′54″W. An ice-covered peak rising to 1,204 metres (3,950 ft) in Snegotin Ridge. Situated 10.06 km northeast of Mount Ignatiev, 4.2 km east of Crown Peak, 9.63 km southeast of Marescot Point, 13.17 km southwest of Tintyava Peak and 10.62 km northwest of Hochstetter Peak. Named after Lardigo Point on the Bulgarian Black Sea Coast.

== Southern features ==
Southern features include, from west to east:

=== Drenta Bluff ===
63°40′27″S 58°25′15″W. An ice-covered bluff of elevation 1,043 metres (3,422 ft) high forming the south extremity of Louis-Philippe Plateau. Situated on the north side of Benz Pass, 1.64 kilometres (1.02 mi) north by west of Gigen Peak, 13.5 kilometres (8.4 mi) southeast of Mount Ignatiev and 6.62 kilometres (4.11 mi) southwest of Smin Peak. Surmounting Verdikal Gap to the west and Cugnot Ice Piedmont to the east-northeast. Named after the settlement of Drenta in Northern Bulgaria.

=== Smin Peak ===
63°38′17″S 58°18′53″W. A partly ice-free peak rising to 866 metres (2,841 ft). Situated in the southeast foothills of Louis-Philippe Plateau, 2.69 kilometres (1.67 mi) south by west of Hochstetter Peak, 3.87 kilometres (2.40 mi) north of Chochoveni Nunatak and 6.61 kilometres (4.11 mi) northeast of Drenta Bluff. Surmounting Cugnot Ice Piedmont to the east and south. Named after the settlement of Smin in Northeastern Bulgaria.

=== Hochstetter Peak ===
63°36′52″S 58°18′12″W. A partly ice-free peak rising to 1,087 metres (3,566 ft) high. Situated in the southeast foothills of Louis-Philippe Plateau, 6.83 kilometres (4.24 mi) west-southwest of Kukuryak Bluff, 10.82 kilometres (6.72 mi) northwest of Levassor Nunatak and 2.69 kilometres (1.67 mi) north by east of Smin Peak. Surmounting Cugnot Ice Piedmont to the east. Named after the German-Austrian geologist Ferdinand von Hochstetter (1829-1884) who worked in Bulgaria, other European countries and New Zealand.

=== Kukuryak Bluff ===
63°35′53″S 58°10′14″W. A partly ice-free bluff rising to 739 metres (2,425 ft) high. Situated at the end of a ridge descending eastwards from Louis-Philippe Plateau, 3.65 kilometres (2.27 mi) south of Windy Gap, 13.54 kilometres (8.41 mi) west-northwest of Kribul Hill, 8.41 kilometres (5.23 mi) north-northwest of Levassor Nunatak and 6.83 kilometres (4.24 mi) east-northeast of Hochstetter Peak. Surmounting Cugnot Ice Piedmont to the southeast. Named after the settlement of Kukuryak in Southern Bulgaria.

== Northern features ==
Northern features include, from west to east:

=== Ogled Peak ===
63°30′20.5″S 58°18′18″W. An ice-covered peak rising to 848 metres (2,782 ft) high in the north foothills of Louis-Philippe Plateau. Situated 3.66 kilometres (2.27 mi) northwest of Tintyava Peak, 12.11 kilometres (7.52 mi) north of Hochstetter Peak and 10.76 kilometres (6.69 mi) northeast of Lardigo Peak. Overlooking Bransfield Strait to the north. Named after the settlement of Ogled in Southern Bulgaria.

=== Tintyava Peak ===
63°31′02″S 58°14′10″W. An ice-covered peak rising to 1,026 metres (3,366 ft) high in the north foothills of Louis-Philippe Plateau. Situated 2.28 kilometres (1.42 mi) west-southwest of Mount D"Urville, 9.57 kilometres (5.95 mi) north-northwest of Kukuryak Bluff and 13.16 kilometres (8.18 mi) east-northeast of Lardigo Peak. Surmounting the upper course of Sestrimo Glacier to the east-southeast. Named after the settlement of Tintyava in Southern Bulgaria.

=== Konush Hill ===
63°29′28″S 58°11′47″W. An ice-covered hill rising to 716 metres (2,349 ft) high in the north foothills of Louis-Philippe Plateau. Situated 5.64 kilometres (3.50 mi) east-northeast of Ogled Peak and5.51 kilometres (3.42 mi) west by south of Cerro Guerrero. Surmounting Sestrimo Glacier to the east and Lafond Bay to the north. Named after the settlements of Konush in Southern Bulgaria.

=== Guerrero Hill ===
63°29′00″S 58°03′00″W. Spanish: Cerro Guerrero. A hill approximately 932 metres (3,058 ft) high, which rises 7 nautical miles (13 km; 8.1 mi) south-southeast of the north end of Cape Ducorps. Named after José N. Guerrero Villarroel, of the cutter Yelcho of the Chilean Navy, who participated in the rescue of the shipwrecked of Sir Ernest Shackleton's British Expedition in 1916.

=== Mount D'Urville ===
63°31′S 58°11′W. A mountain, 1,085 metres (3,560 ft) high, standing close north of the east end of Louis Philippe Plateau. Discovered by the French expedition, 1837-40, and named for the expedition leader, Captain (later Admiral) Jules Dumont d'Urville.

== Sources ==
- Alberts, Fred G., ed. (1995), Geographic Names of the Antarctic (PDF) (2 ed.), United States Board on Geographic Names This article incorporates public domain material from websites or documents of the United States Board on Geographic Names.

REMA Explorer
The Reference Elevation Model of Antarctica (REMA) gives ice surface measurements of most of the continent. When a feature is ice-covered, the ice surface will differ from the underlying rock surface and will change over time. To see ice surface contours and elevation of a feature as of the last REMA update,
- Open the Antarctic REMA Explorer
- Enter the feature's coordinates in the box at the top left that says "Find address or place", then press enter
  The coordinates should be in DMS format, e.g. 65°05'03"S 64°01'02"W. If you only have degrees and minutes, you may not be able to locate the feature.
- Hover over the icons at the left of the screen
- Find "Hillshade" and click on that
  In the bottom right of the screen, set "Shading Factor" to 0 to get a clearer image
- Find "Contour" and click on that
  In the "Contour properties" box, select Contour Interval = 1m
  You can zoom in and out to see the ice surface contours of the feature and nearby features
- Find "Identify" and click on that
  Click the point where the contour lines seem to indicate the top of the feature
  The "Identify" box will appear to the top left. The Orthometric height is the elevation of the ice surface of the feature at this point.

- Antarctic REMA Explorer (Digital Elevation Models created by the Polar Geospatial Center from Maxar imagery), Polar Geospatial Center, University of Minnesota, 2019
- "Drenta Bluff", Composite Gazetteer of Antarctica, Scientific Committee on Antarctic Research
- "Guerrero Hill", Composite Gazetteer of Antarctica, Scientific Committee on Antarctic Research
- Graham Land and South Shetland Islands, BAS: British Antarctic Survey, 2005
- "Hochstetter Peak", Composite Gazetteer of Antarctica, Scientific Committee on Antarctic Research
- "Huhla Col", Composite Gazetteer of Antarctica, Scientific Committee on Antarctic Research
- "Konush Hill", Composite Gazetteer of Antarctica, Scientific Committee on Antarctic Research
- "Kukuryak Bluff", Composite Gazetteer of Antarctica, Scientific Committee on Antarctic Research
- "Lardigo Peak", Composite Gazetteer of Antarctica, Scientific Committee on Antarctic Research
- "Ogled Peak", Composite Gazetteer of Antarctica, Scientific Committee on Antarctic Research
- "Prelez Gap", Composite Gazetteer of Antarctica, Scientific Committee on Antarctic Research
- "Smin Peak", Composite Gazetteer of Antarctica, Scientific Committee on Antarctic Research
- "Snegotin Ridge", Composite Gazetteer of Antarctica, Scientific Committee on Antarctic Research
- "Tintyava Peak", Composite Gazetteer of Antarctica, Scientific Committee on Antarctic Research
- "Trajan Gate", Composite Gazetteer of Antarctica, Scientific Committee on Antarctic Research
- Trinity Peninsula (PDF) (Scale 1:250000 topographic map No. 5697), Institut für Angewandte Geodäsie and British Antarctic Survey, 1996, archived from the original (PDF) on 23 September 2015

This article incorporates public domain material from websites or documents of the United States Geological Survey.
