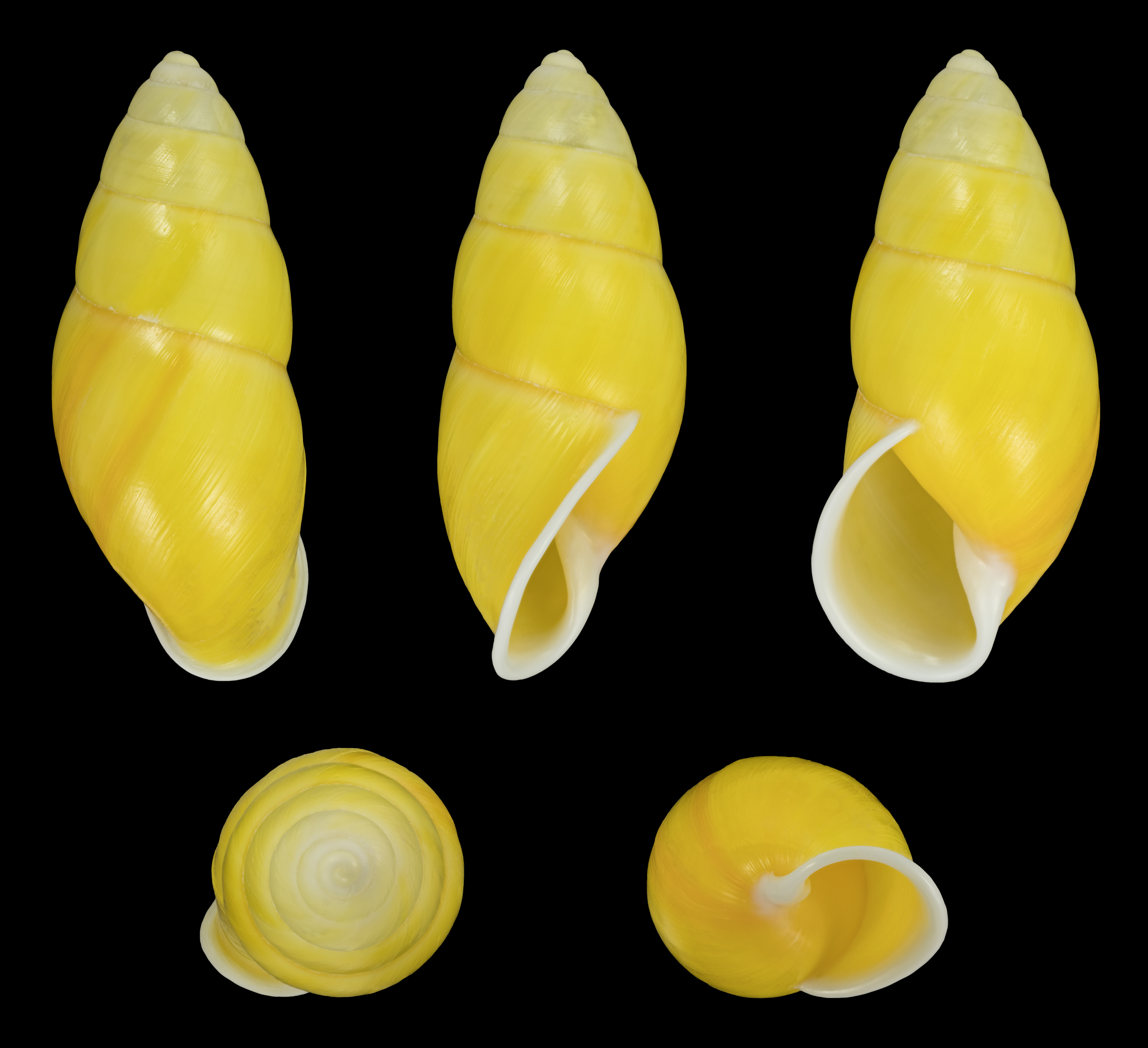
- Shell of Amphidromus sulphuratus

Scientific classification
- Kingdom: Animalia
- Phylum: Mollusca
- Class: Gastropoda
- Order: Stylommatophora
- Family: Camaenidae
- Genus: Amphidromus
- Species: A. sulphuratus

Binomial name
- Amphidromus sulphuratus (Hombron & Jacquinot, 1847)

Synonyms
- Amphidromus calista Pilsbry, 1900 junior subjective synonym; Amphidromus calista f. pallidula Pilsbry, 1900; Amphidromus calista f. purissima Pilsbry, 1900; Amphidromus calista f. rosa Pilsbry, 1900; Amphidromus chloris (Reeve, 1848) junior subjective synonym; Amphidromus chloris var. calista Pilsbry, 1900 (basionym); Amphidromus chloris var. pallidulus Pilsbry, 1900; Amphidromus chloris var. purissimus Pilsbry, 1900 junior subjective synonym; Amphidromus chloris var. rosa Pilsbry, 1900; Amphidromus maculiferus cosmius Bartsch, 1917; Amphidromus mearnsi Bartsch, 1917; Amphidromus pallidulus Pilsbry, 1900; Amphidromus perversus var. chloris (Reeve, 1848) (variety); Bulimus chloris Reeve, 1848 (original combination); Bulimus sulphuratus Hombron & Jacquinot, 1847 (original combination)

= Amphidromus sulphuratus =

Species of gastropod

Amphidromus sulphuratus, common name the canary-bird bulimus, is a species of air-breathing land snail, a terrestrial pulmonate gastropod mollusc in the family Camaenidae.

== Description ==
Shells can reach a length of about 50 millimetres (2.0 in).

(Described as Bulimus sulphuratus) The sinistral shell is cylindrically oblong and slightly fusiform. It contains six to seven convex whorls. These are smooth or very finely longitudinally striated. The columella is broad and somewhat callous. The aperture is rather small, the outer lip is reflected. The shell is deep citron yellow, with a white lip and columella.

(Described as Amphidromus maculiferus cosmius) The very thin shell is elongate-ovate. It is yellowish-white, with moderately rounded whorls appressed at the apex. The initial two whorls exhibit a faint, narrow dark band immediately above the suture. Subsequent whorls are marked by irregularly disposed, hyaline axial bands of variable width, most pronounced on the third and fourth whorls. The body whorl displays weak axial threads, the remaining surface showing only incremental growth lines. The aperture is ova. The outer lip is slightly expanded and reflected, thin and white at the margi. The inner lip is short, somewhat twisted, broadened at the base, and partially reflected over the narrow umbilicus. The parietal wall is covered by a thin, pale rust-colored callus.

(Described as Amphidromus chloris) The shell is usually sinistral, umbilicate or rimate, and oblong-ovate, exhibiting variable coloration, but typically a clear bright yellow, with a narrow pale or white band below the suture. It lacks dark varices and presents a solid, smoothish surface, showing weak striatulations and faint spiral striations. The spire is long and a little convexly conic, with an obtuse, whitish apex. Comprising six and a half but slightly convex whorls that are hardly compressed below the sutures, the shell features a small, ovate aperture that is white or slightly rufous yellowish-tinted within. The peristome is white throughout, with the outer lip thickened, reflexed, and recurved but not adnate behind, and a white edge. The columellar margin appears dilated above, with a thickened white edge passing up the parietal margin some distance; the parietal callus elsewhere is translucent and shows the underlying color, rarely being thicker and whitish.

== Distribution ==
This species can be found in the Philippines, Indonesia, Vietnam and Cambodia.
