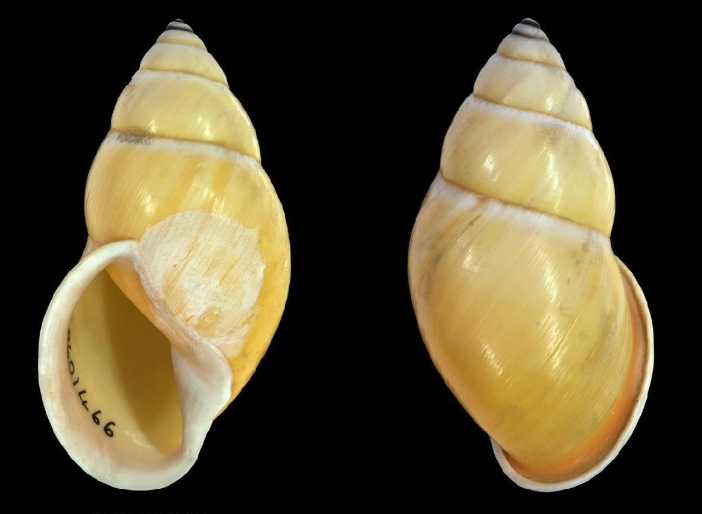
- Shell of Amphidromus inflatus (lectotype at the Natural History Museum, London)

Scientific classification
- Kingdom: Animalia
- Phylum: Mollusca
- Class: Gastropoda
- Order: Stylommatophora
- Family: Camaenidae
- Genus: Amphidromus
- Species: A. inflatus

Binomial name
- Amphidromus inflatus Fulton, 1896

Synonyms
- Amphidromus maculiferus inflatus Fulton, 1896; Amphidromus maculiferus var. inflata Fulton, 1896 (basionym)

= Amphidromus inflatus =

Species of gastropod

Amphidromus inflatus is a species of air-breathing land snail, a terrestrial pulmonate gastropod mollusc in the family Camaenidae.

== Description ==
The length of the shell attains 66 mm, its diameter 38 mm.

(Original description) This species was originally described as a variety of Amphidromus maculiferus. The sinistral shell exhibits a large, inflated form and a lemon-yellow coloration, with a narrow white band at the suture of the lower whorls. The initial 2.5 whorls feature a dark fillet at the suture.

(As described by P. Bartsch) The ovate shell is pale yellow. The reflected outer lip occasionally displays a pale orange margin. The initial three whorls exhibit a narrow black band directly above the suture. The shell is appressed at the apex. All whorls are well-rounded, displaying prominent, retractive axial growth lines and faint spiral striations. The sutures are weakly constricted. The aperture is large, yellow internally. The slightly expanded and reflected outer lip, as well as the inner lip, are white. The inner lip is slightly twisted, expanded at the base, and along the aperture and peristome, exhibits a bluish-white hue. The inner lip is broadened at its insertion, merging with the thin callus covering the parietal wall, and reflected over the narrow umbilicus.

== Distribution ==
The type species was found on Baranda, Philippine Islands.
