= Clanculus ater =

Scientific classification
- Kingdom: Animalia
- Phylum: Mollusca
- Class: Gastropoda
- Subclass: Vetigastropoda
- Order: Trochida
- Superfamily: Trochoidea
- Family: Trochidae
- Genus: Clanculus
- Species: C. ater

Binomial name
- Clanculus ater (Pilsbry, 1901)

Synonyms
- Clanculus microdon var. ater Pilsbry, 1901 (basionym)

Species of gastropod

Clanculus ater, common name the topsnail, is a species of sea snail, a marine gastropod mollusk in the family Trochidae, the top snails.

== Description ==
The size of the shell varies between 7 mm and 14 mm. The black shell shows a few inconspicuous whitish dots. It has a bright rose apex. The coloration resembles Clanculus atropurpureus. The shell contains 6 whorls. There are about 17 spiral lirae on the body whorl, with threads or minor lirae in some of the intervals. The whorls of Ihe spire are angular by the prominence of the middle beaded cord.

== Distribution ==
This marine species occurs off Japan.
