= Huhla =

- Village
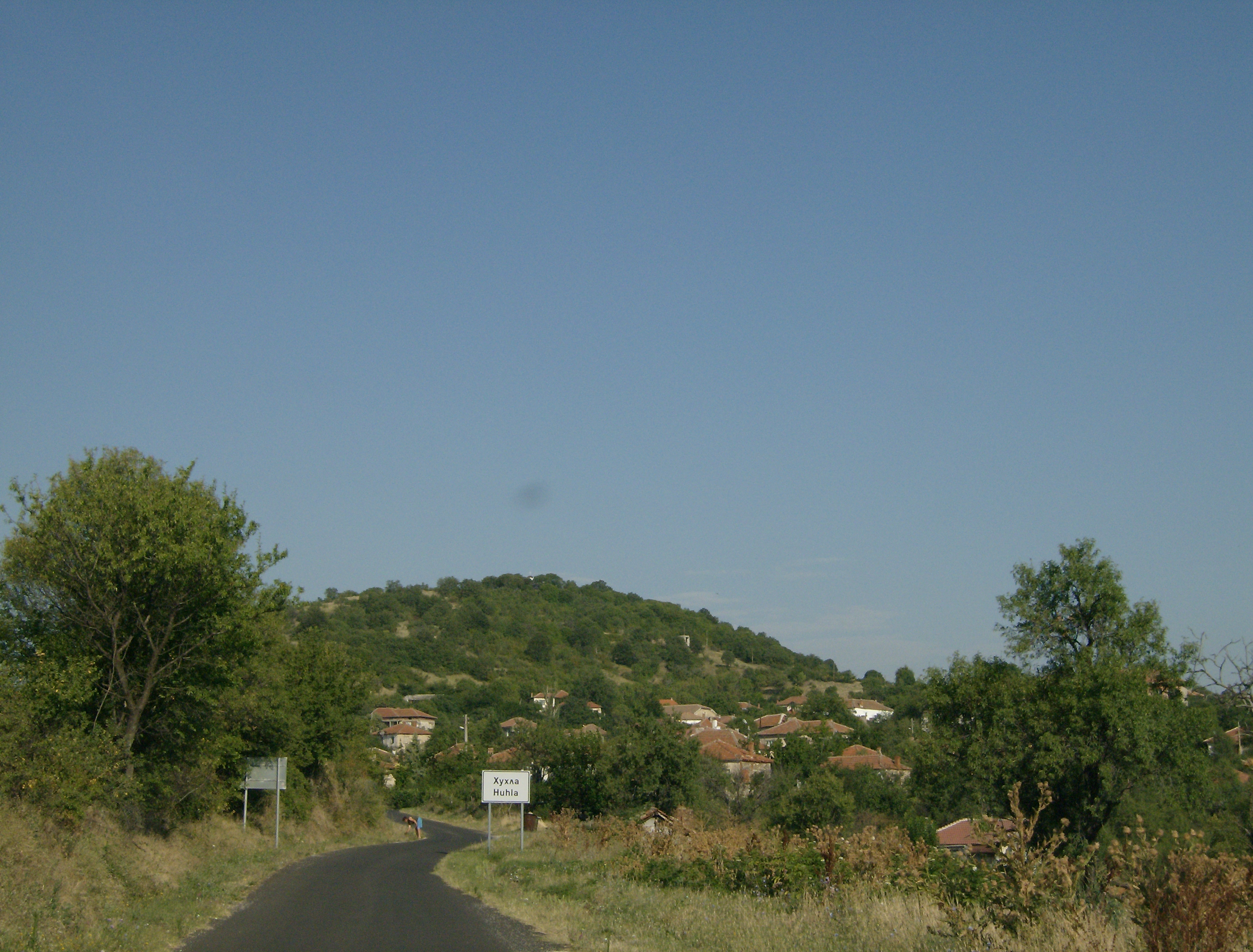
- Roadsign leading to the village

- Location within Bulgaria
- Coordinates: 41.5667°N 26.1000°E
- Country: Bulgaria
- Province: Haskovo Province
- Municipality: Ivaylovgrad
- Time zone: UTC+2 (EET)
  - Summer (DST): UTC+3 (EEST)

Huhla is a village in the municipality of Ivaylovgrad, in Haskovo Province, in southern Bulgaria.

Huhla Col on Trinity Peninsula in Antarctica is named after the village.
