= Greben (mountain) =

Mountain in Serbia and Bulgaria

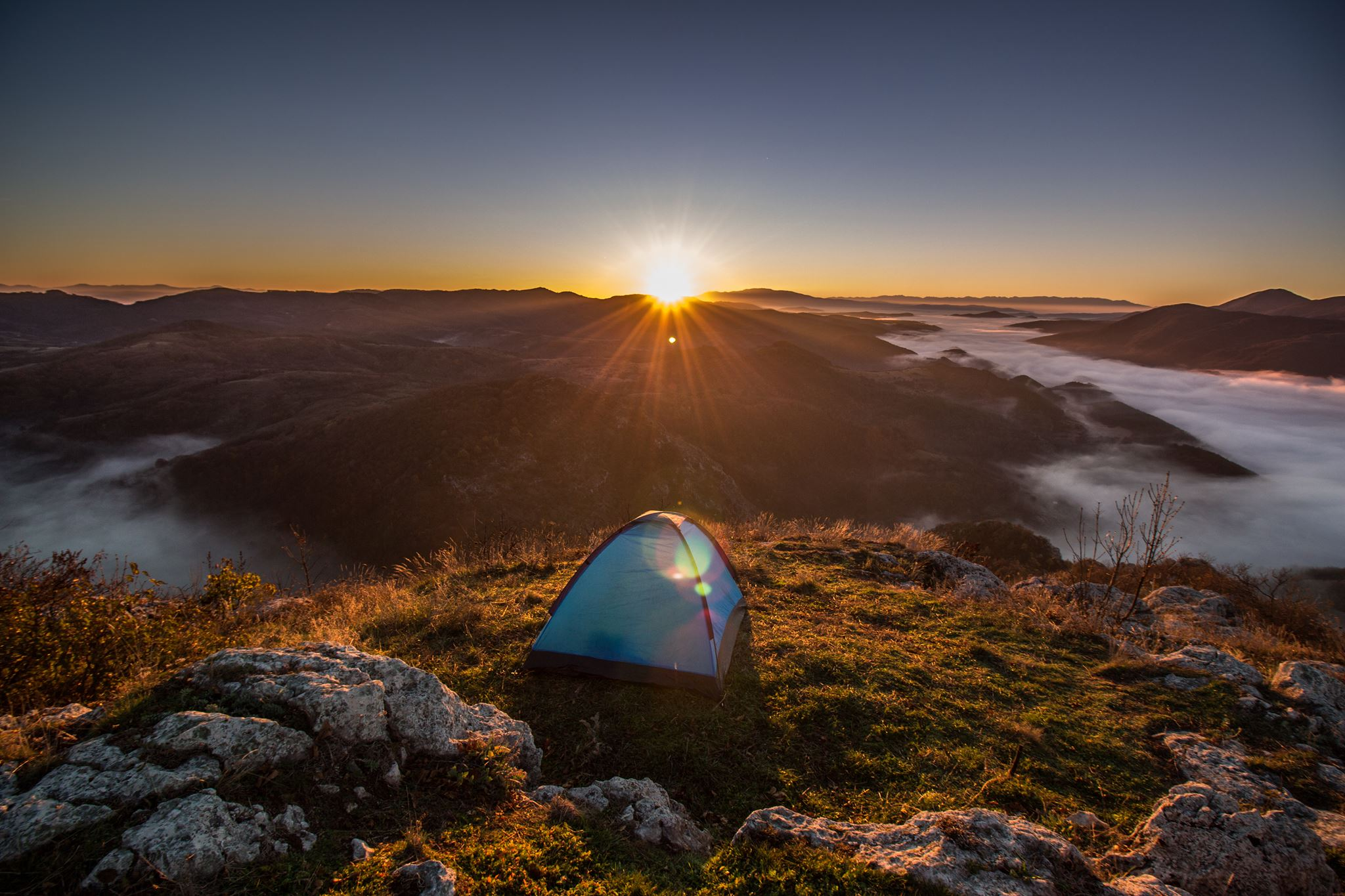
- View from Dragovski kamak (1,118 m)

Highest point
- Elevation: 1,338 m (4,390 ft)
- Coordinates: 42°56′54″N 22°38′29″E

Geography
- Location within Serbia
- Location: Serbia / Bulgaria
- Parent range: Balkan Mountains

Greben (Cyrillic: Гребен, meaning "ridge" or literally "comb") is a mountain in southeastern Serbia, with a small section of the southwestern ridge in Bulgaria. Its highest peak, Beženište (or Džiglina livada), stands at an elevation of 1,338 meters above sea level.

It is named after a large karst ridge that runs along its spine. Greben rises near the village of Poganovo in Serbia, in the municipality of Dimitrovgrad, and extends southeast towards the Bulgarian village of Vrabcha.

The highest peak within Bulgaria is called Golesh (Голеш) at 1,157m, which is on the border between Serbia and Bulgaria. The most famous peak within Bulgaria is Dragovski kamak (Драговски камък), at 1,118 m. Due to the characteristic pyramidal shape of its north face, Dragovski kamak is referred to as the "Matterhorn of Tran".

With nearby Vlaška planina, Greben forms the attractive canyon (Poganovsko ždrelo) of the Jerma river.

Greben Hill in the Antarctica was named after the mountain by the Bulgarian Antarctic Place-names Commission.

== Gallery ==
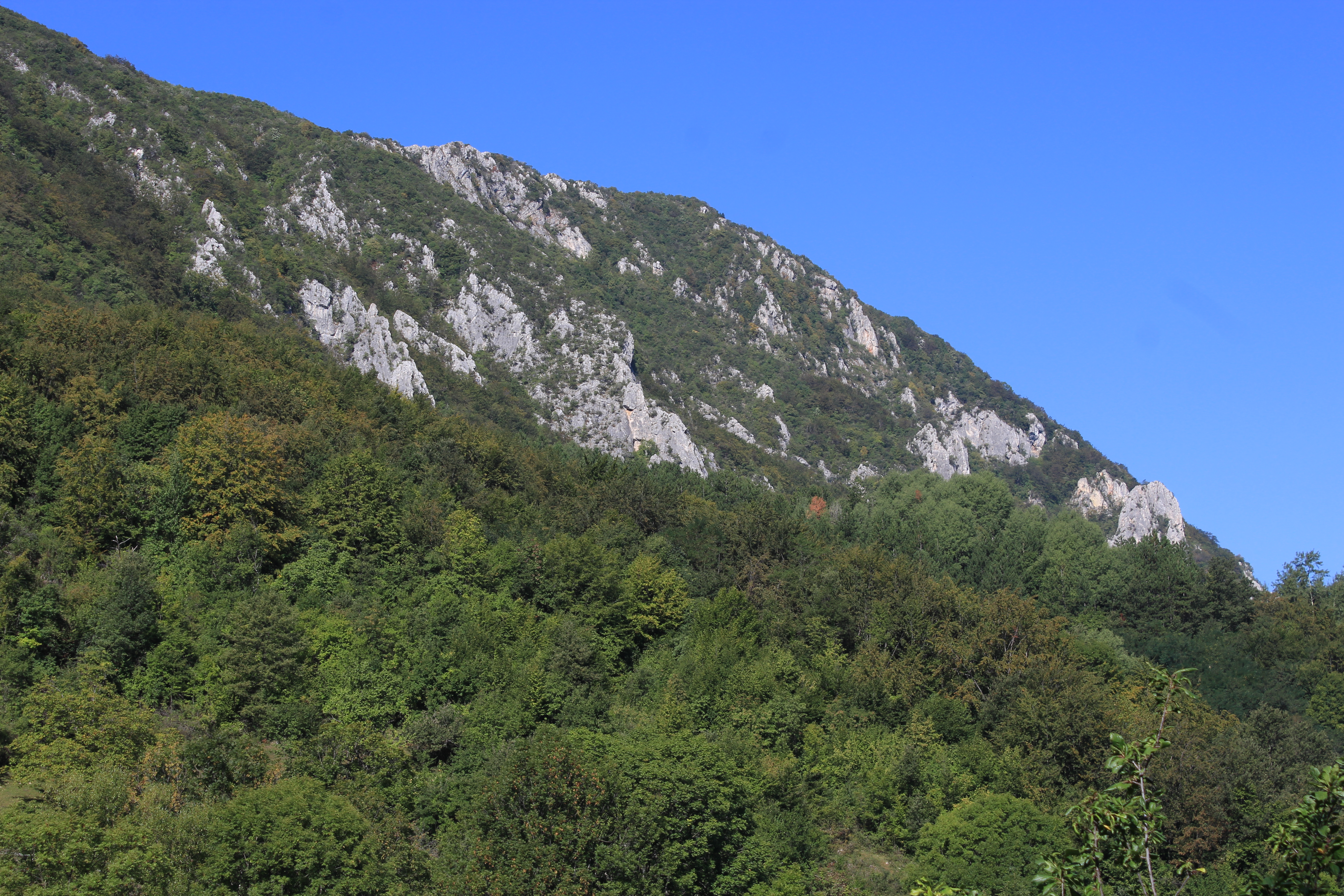

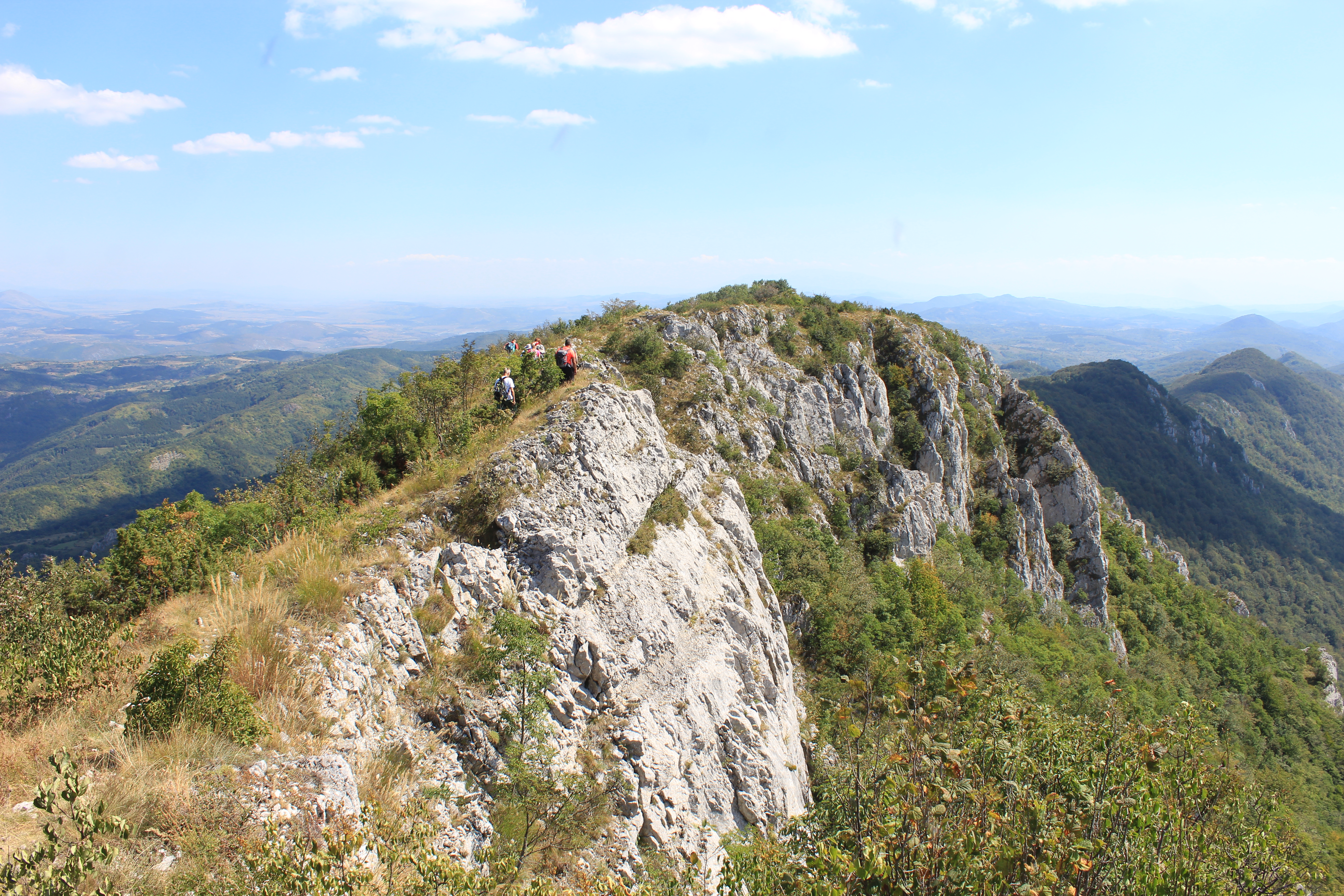

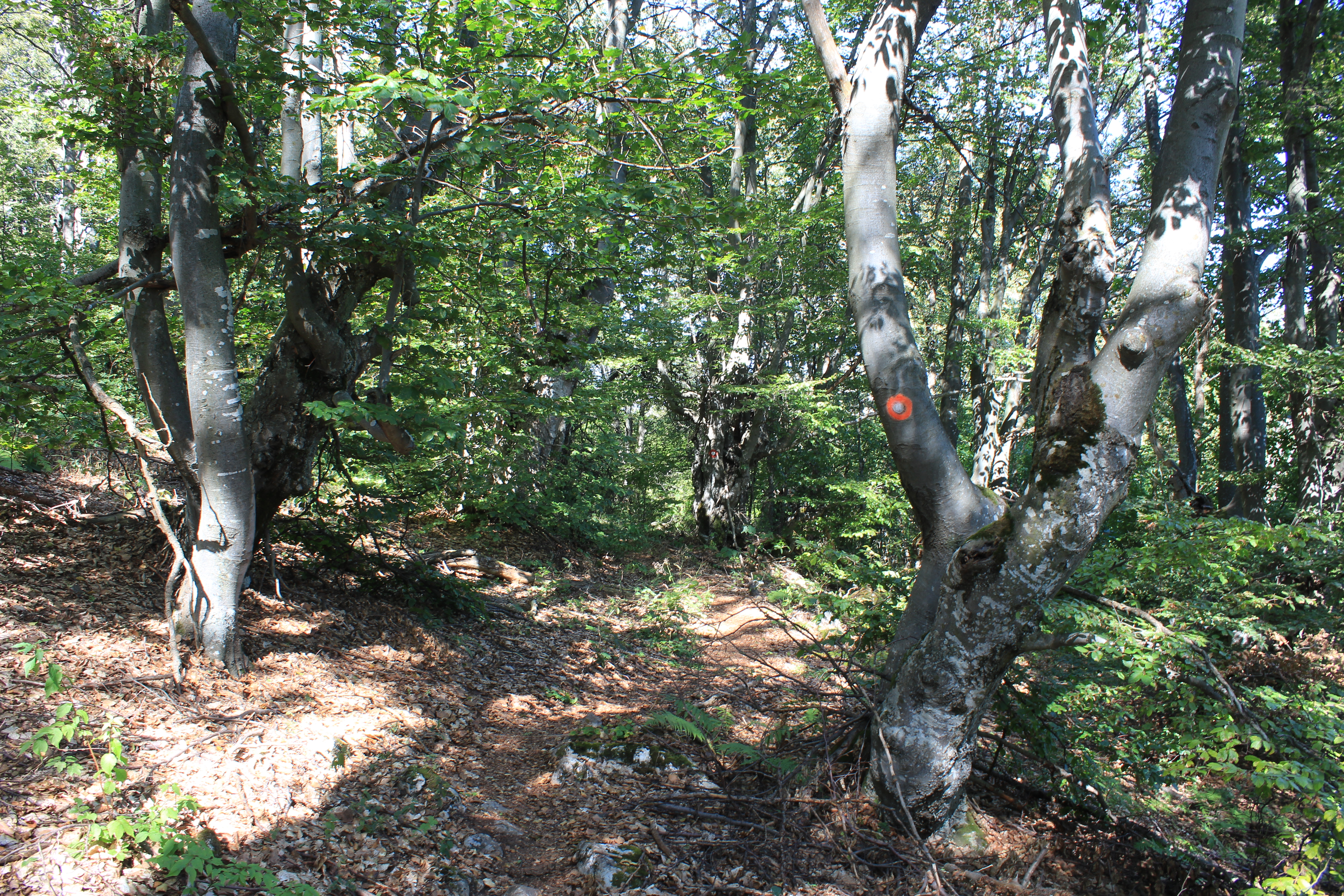

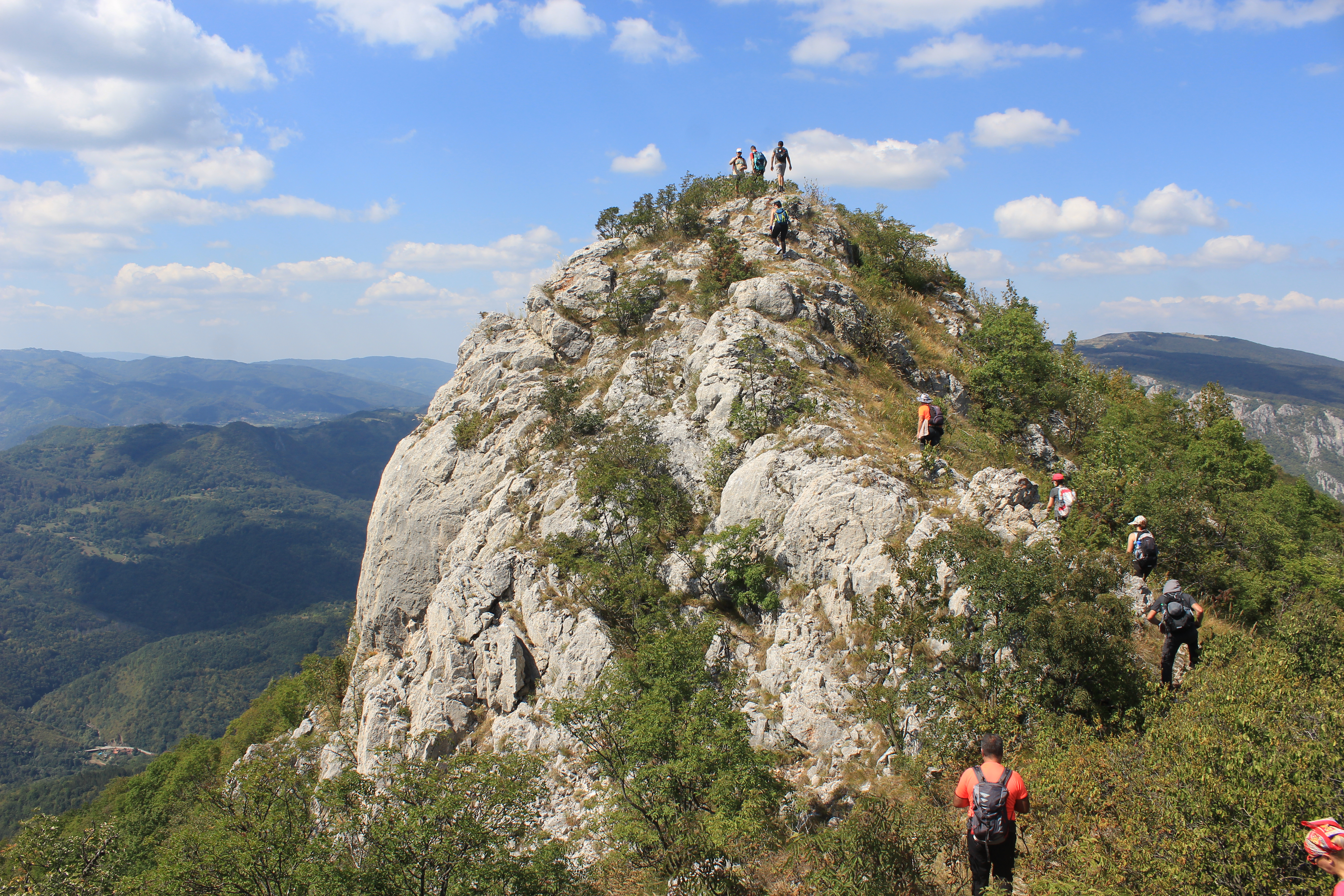

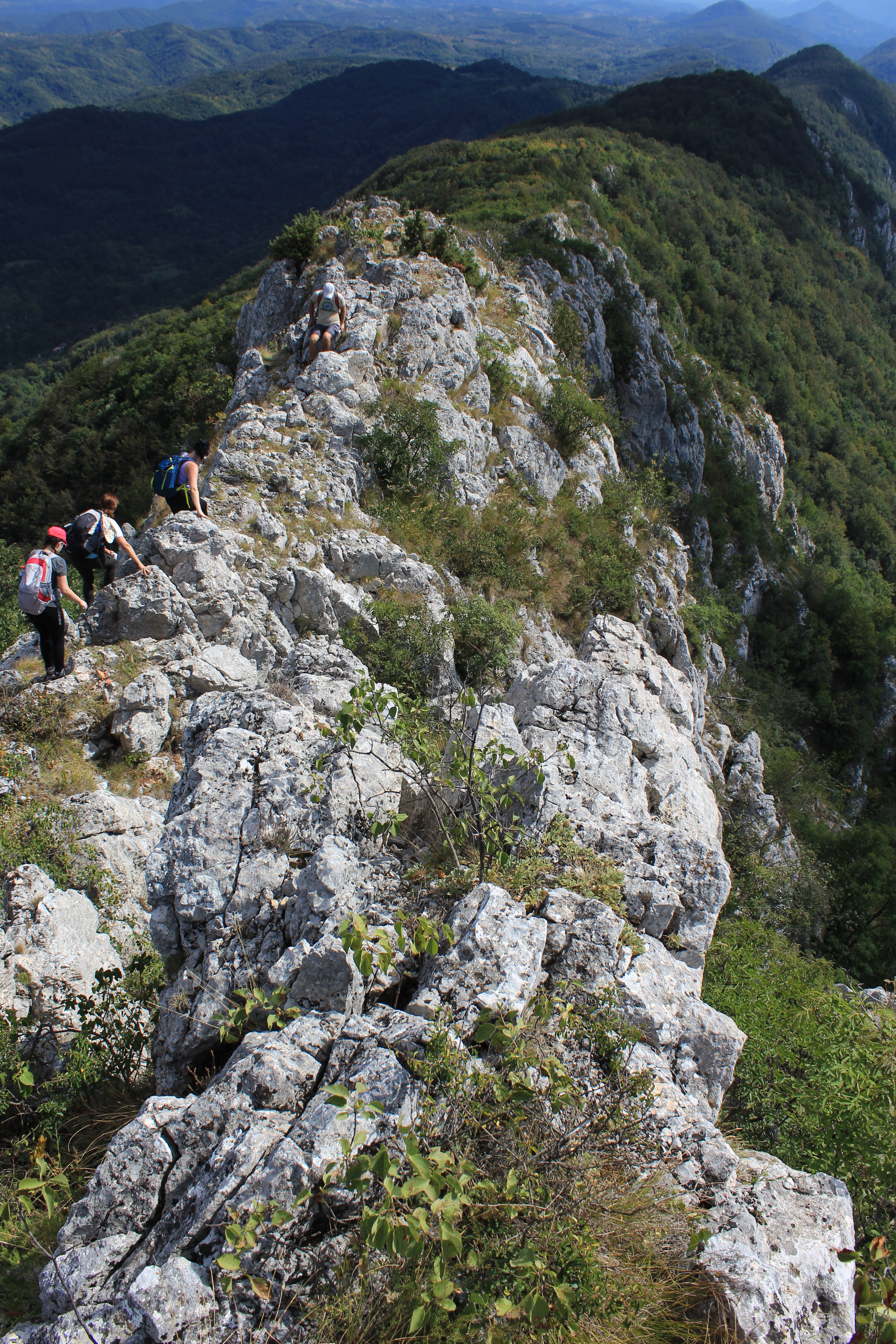

== See also ==
- List of mountains in Serbia
