= Lambuh =

- Village
- Location within Bulgaria
- Coordinates: 41.5833°N 26.1167°E
- Country: Bulgaria
- Province: Haskovo Province
- Municipality: Ivaylovgrad
- Time zone: UTC+2 (EET)
  - Summer (DST): UTC+3 (EEST)

Lambuh is a village in the municipality of Ivaylovgrad, in Haskovo Province, in southern Bulgaria.

Lambuh Knoll on Trinity Peninsula in Antarctica is named after the village.
