= Gaston de Roquemaurel =

Navy officer and explorer

Gaston Rocquemaurel
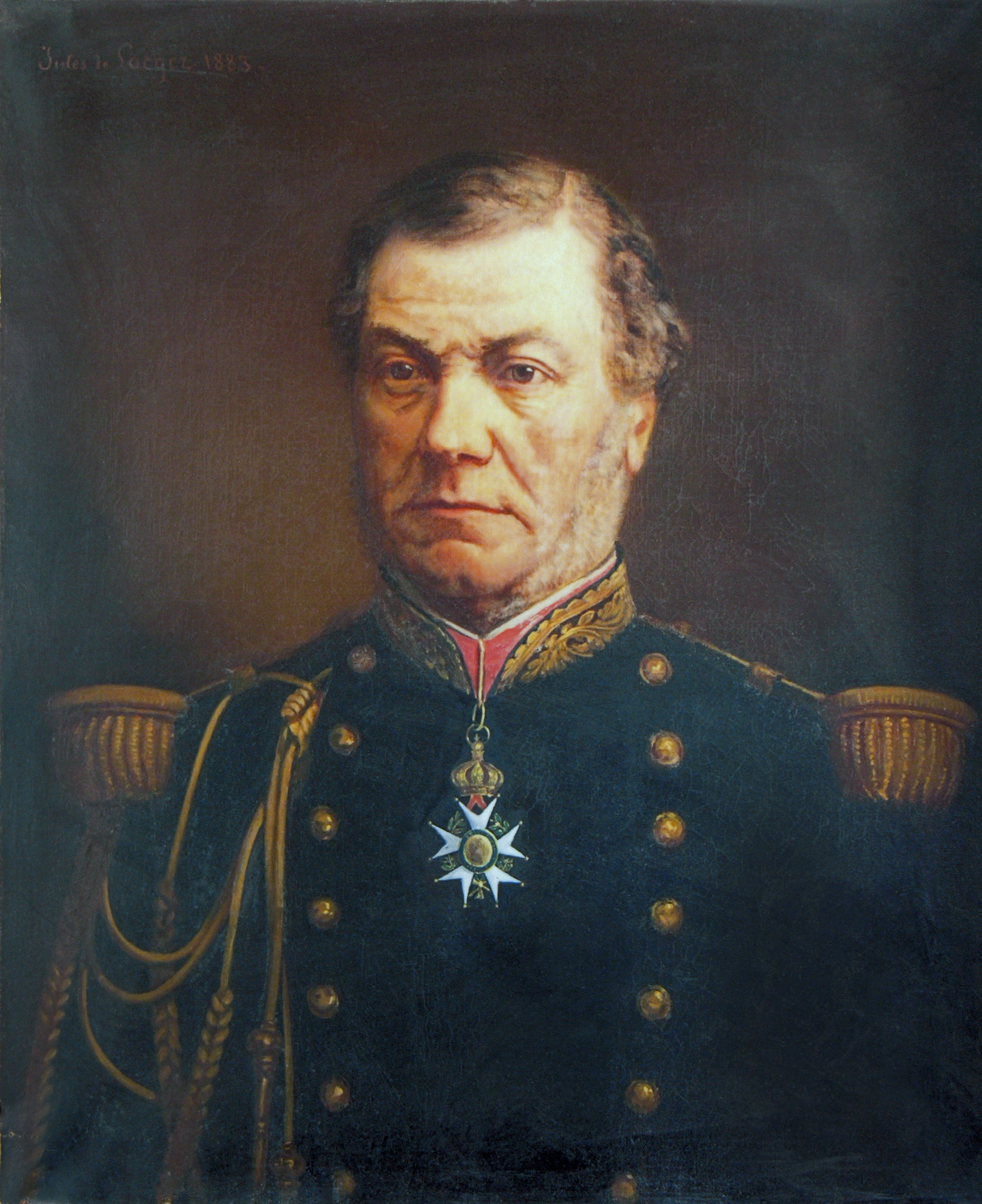
- Gaston Rocquemaurel
- Born: Louis François Gaston Marie Auguste Rocquemaurel; 27 September 1804; Toulouse
- Died: 1 April 1878 (aged 73); Toulouse
- Education: École Polytechnique
- Relatives: Jean-Pierre Marcassus de Puymaurin
- Military career
- Allegiance: France
- Branch: Navy
- Rank: Captain
- Other work: Explorer

Louis François Gaston Marie Auguste Rocquemaurel, also known as de Roquemaurel, was a French Navy Officer and explorer, born on 27 September 1804 in Toulouse and died on 1 April 1878 in Toulouse.

Nephew, by his mother, of Jean-Pierre Marcassus de Puymaurin, he took care of his education after the death of his father. Gaston Rocquemaurel was a student at the college of Auch and Toulouse at the Royal College, where he prepared for the entrance examination at the École Polytechnique. Received in 1823, it is the same promotion, among others, that the economist Michel Chevalier received. He left school in 1825 and entered into a naval officer career.

He sailed a long time in the Mediterranean, and was promoted to Lieutenant in 1834, which he obtained through the Captain Jacquinot, under the command of which he served during the expedition of Algiers (1830) and boarded for the second expedition of Dumont d'Urville around the world and in Antarctica. Rocquemaurel became the second commander of the Dumont d'Urville expedition on board the Astrolabe and kept the expedition logbook, which lasted from 7 September 1837 to 6 November 1840.

== Museum of Toulouse ==
He then retired to Toulouse, where he entered the Academy of Floral Games. During his travels, Rocquemaurel had an important library collection and ethnographic collection bequeathed to the city of Toulouse. In 1882 donations from Rocquemaurel were transported and presented in the new Museum of Ancient and Exotic Decorative Art (Musée Saint-Raymond) and then transferred to the Museum in 1922. It is also the source of exotic malacology collections of that museum. In 1950 the space at the Asian and Pacific ethnography collection was named the "Roquemaurel Gallery". Rocquemaurel was the original basis of rich ethnographic collection of the Natural History Museum of Toulouse.

== Debate on the spelling of the name Rocquemaurel ==
The name Gaston Rocquemaurel can be a source of confusion due to the many different spellings that exist. Gaston Rocquemaurel's birth certificate and his personal file in the Naval Archives both use the spelling « Roquemaurel », whilst his death certificate spells it « Rocquemaurel ». All the anthologies of the Académie des Jeux Floraux list the name as « de Rocquemaurel ». As for the Toulouse Museum, it currently uses the spelling « de Roquemaurel ». These different forms can therefore be found in various archives and contemporary publications.

In March 1848, Gaston Rocquemaurel applied to the Civil court of Toulouse to have his birth certificate corrected so that his name would be spelled correctly as « Rocquemaurel ». He justified this request on the grounds of customary usage, stating that his name had always been spelled in this way within his family and that it was therefore an error in the birth certificate. The court ruled in his favour on 21 March 1848, and the correction is clearly noted in the margin of the birth certificate in the civil register, as ordered by the court. The president of the Toulouse Geographical Society adds that Gaston Rocquemaurel also signed his name as « Rocquemaurel » until the end of his life, including in his will.

== Ethnology ==
=== Art of Fiji ===
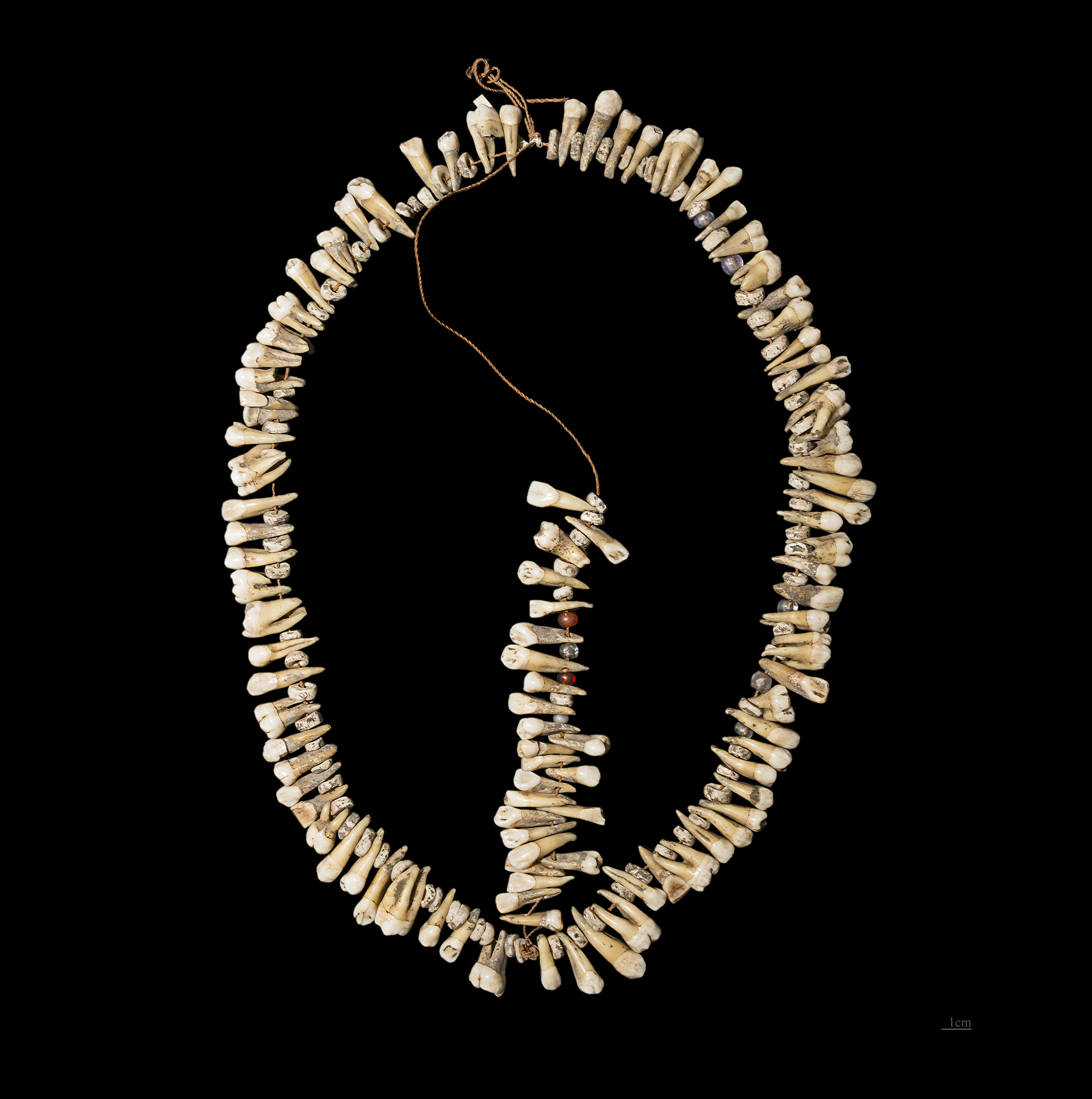
Necklace - War Trophy made of human teeth

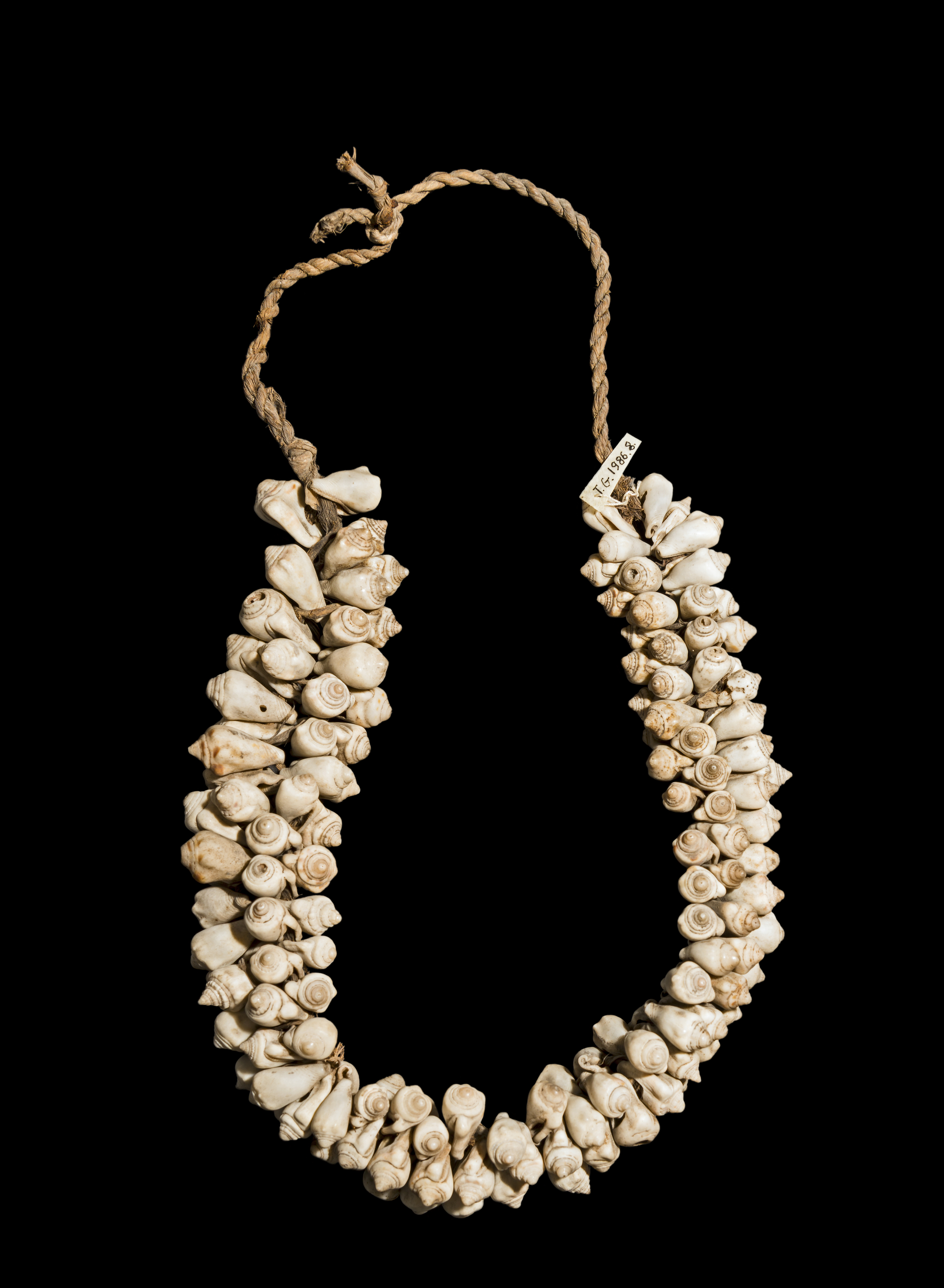
Necklace - shell

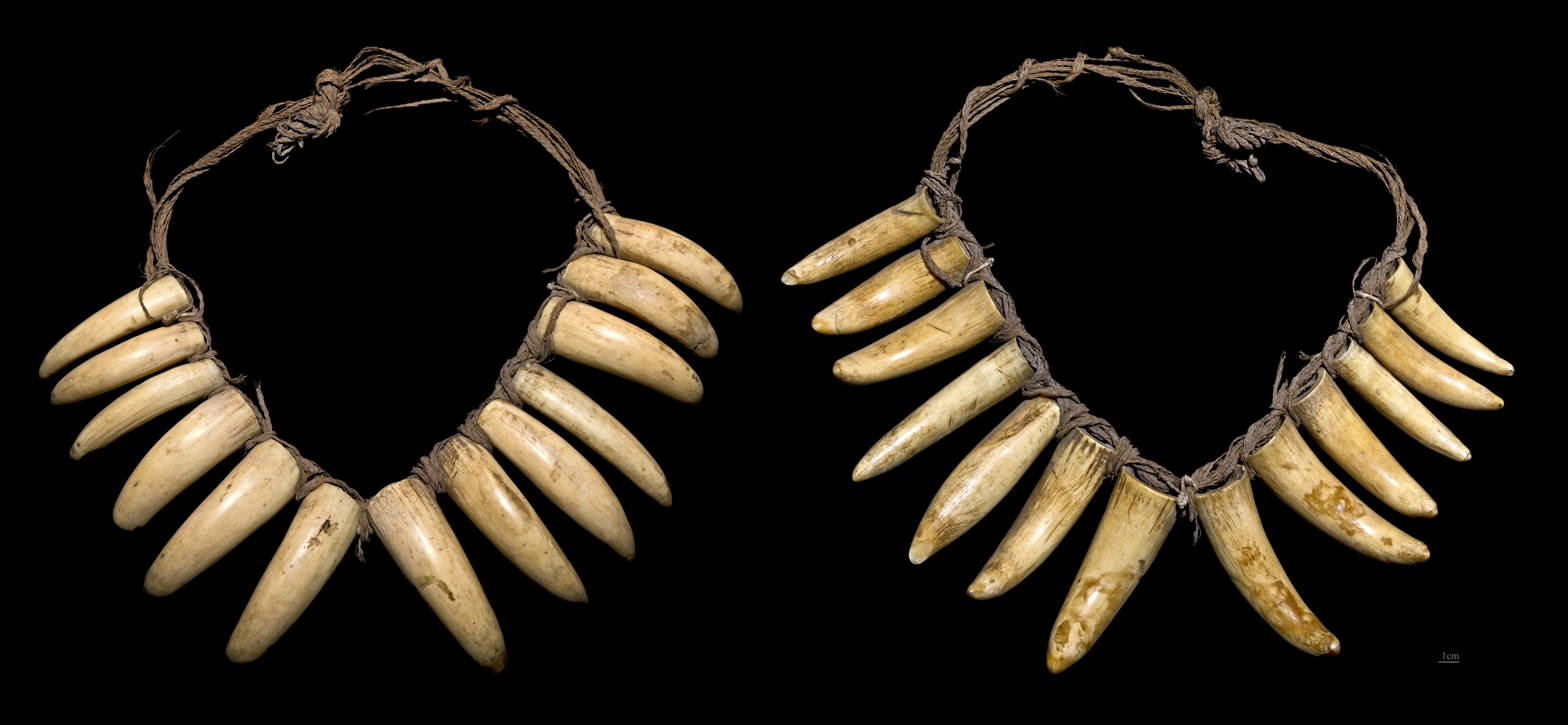
Necklace sperm whale teeth

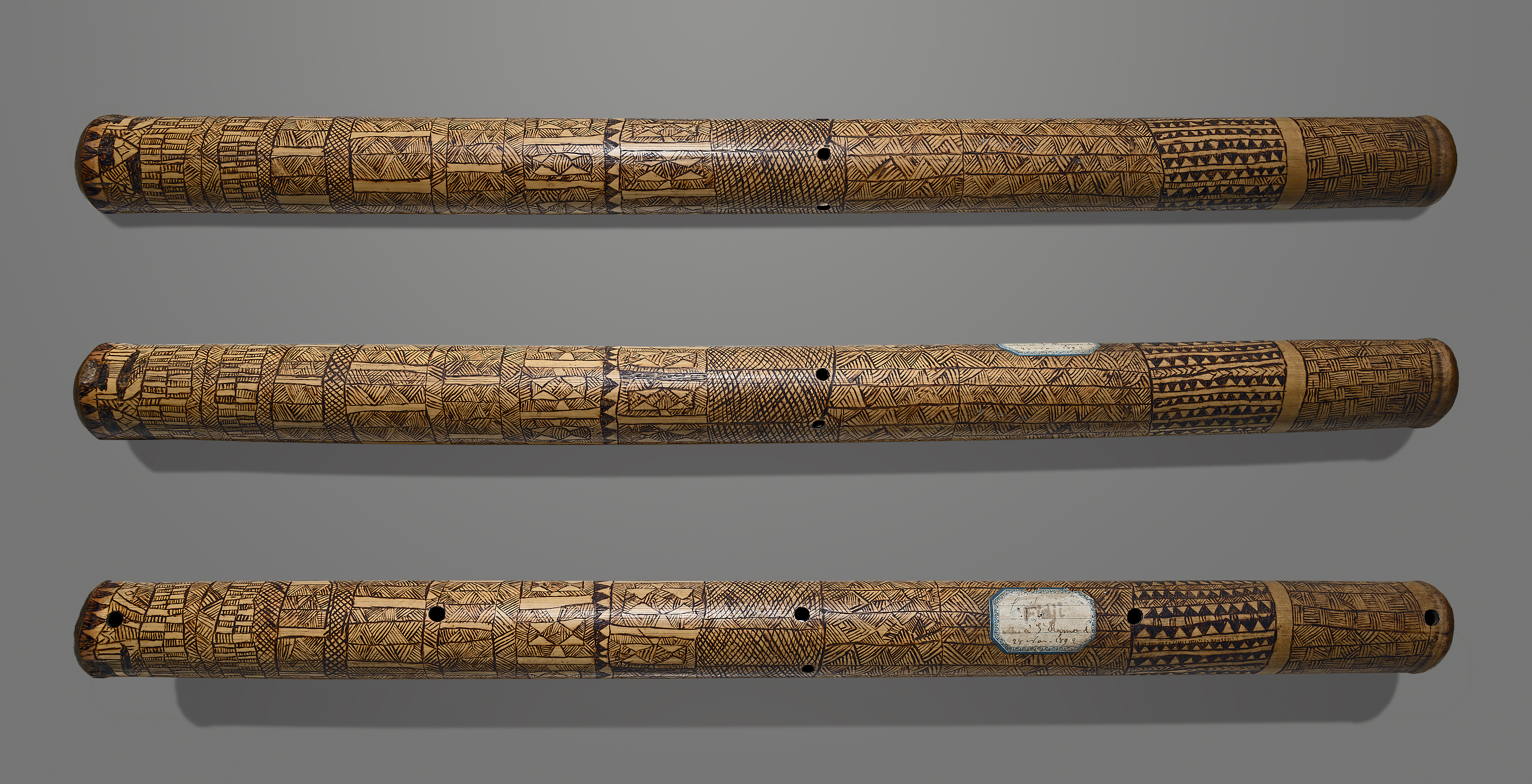
Nose flute

=== Art of Salomons ===
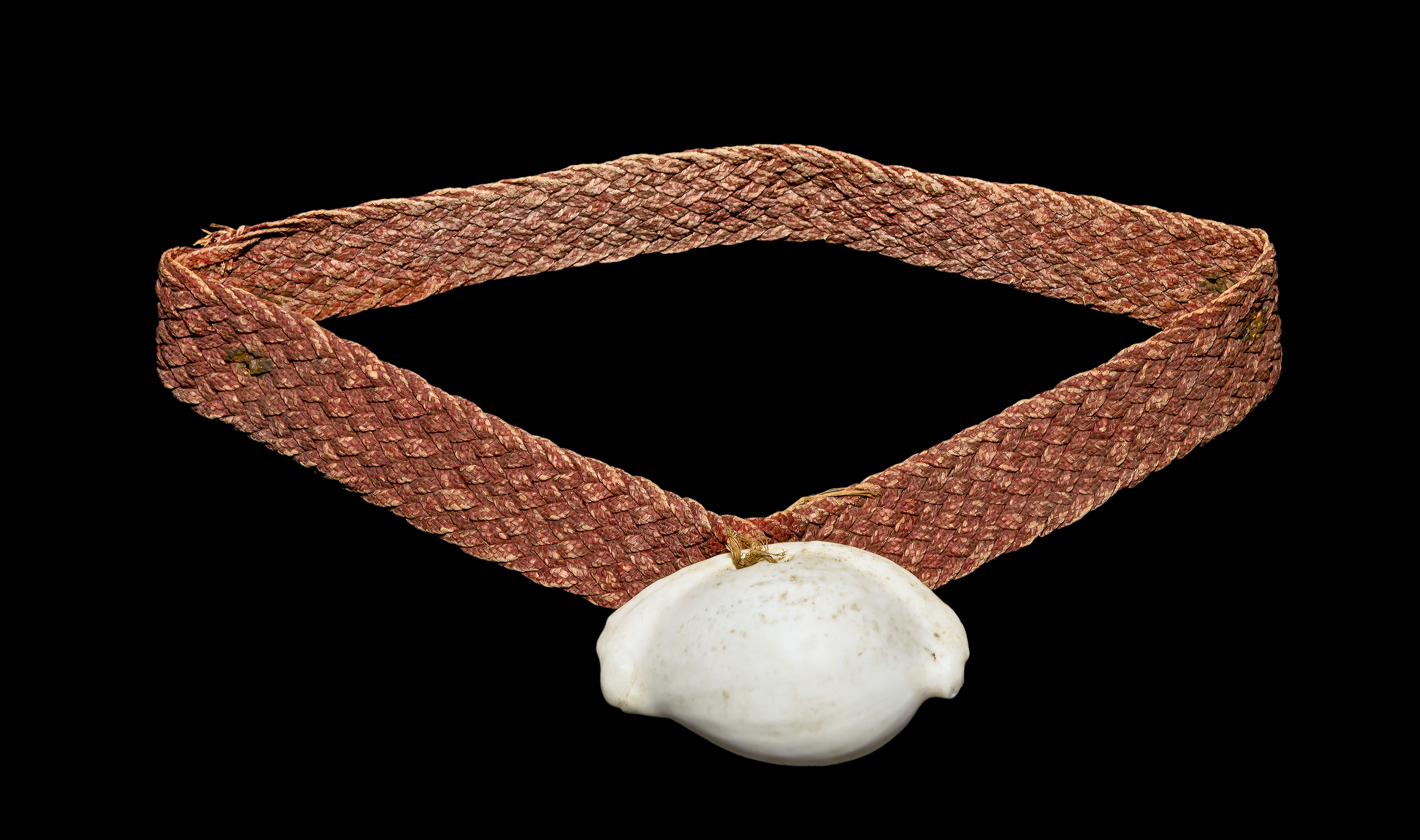
Braided Headband

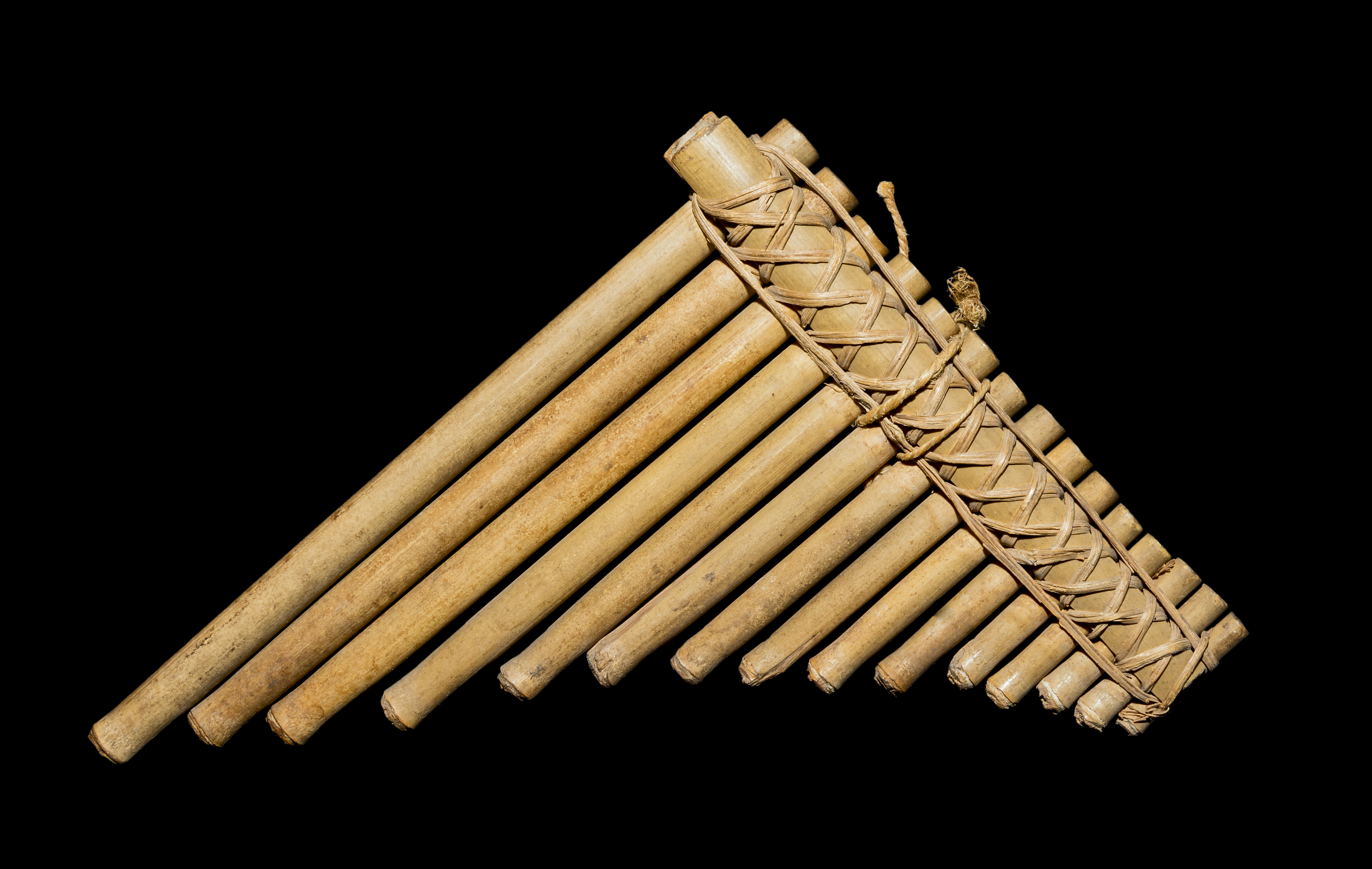
Pan flute Solomon Islands

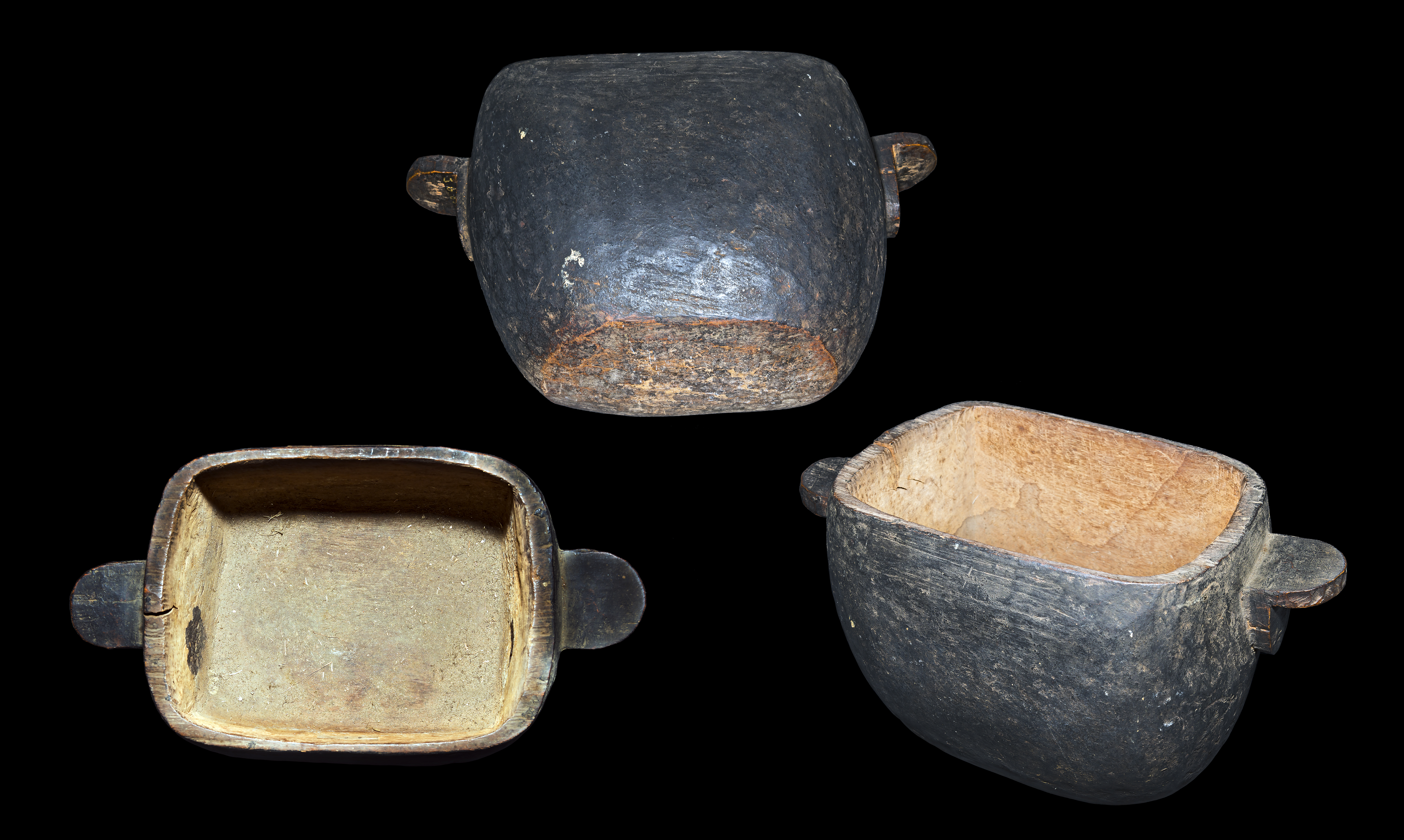
Wooden container - Solomon Islands

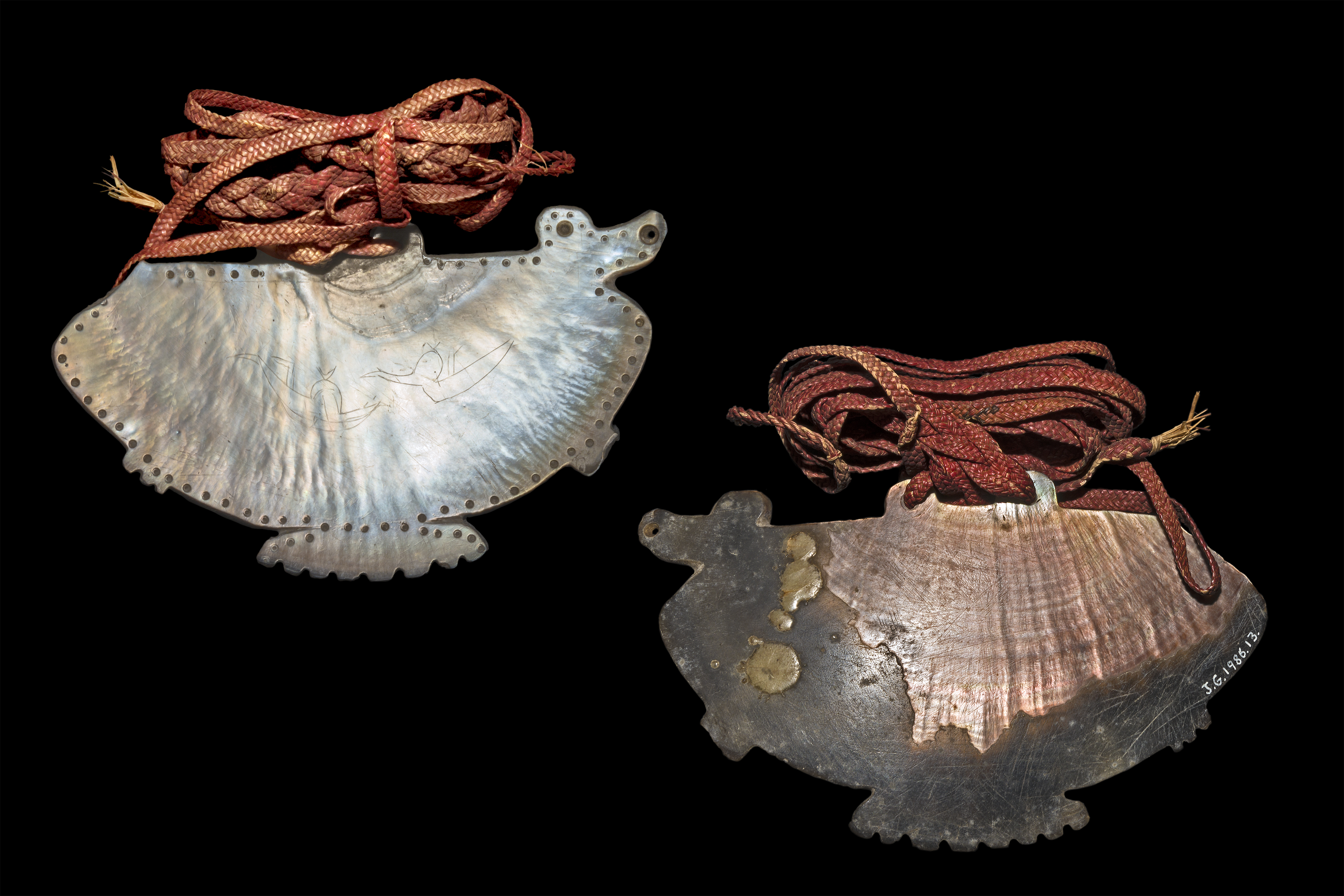
Nacre pendant engraved - Solomon Islands

=== Malacology and Mineralogy ===
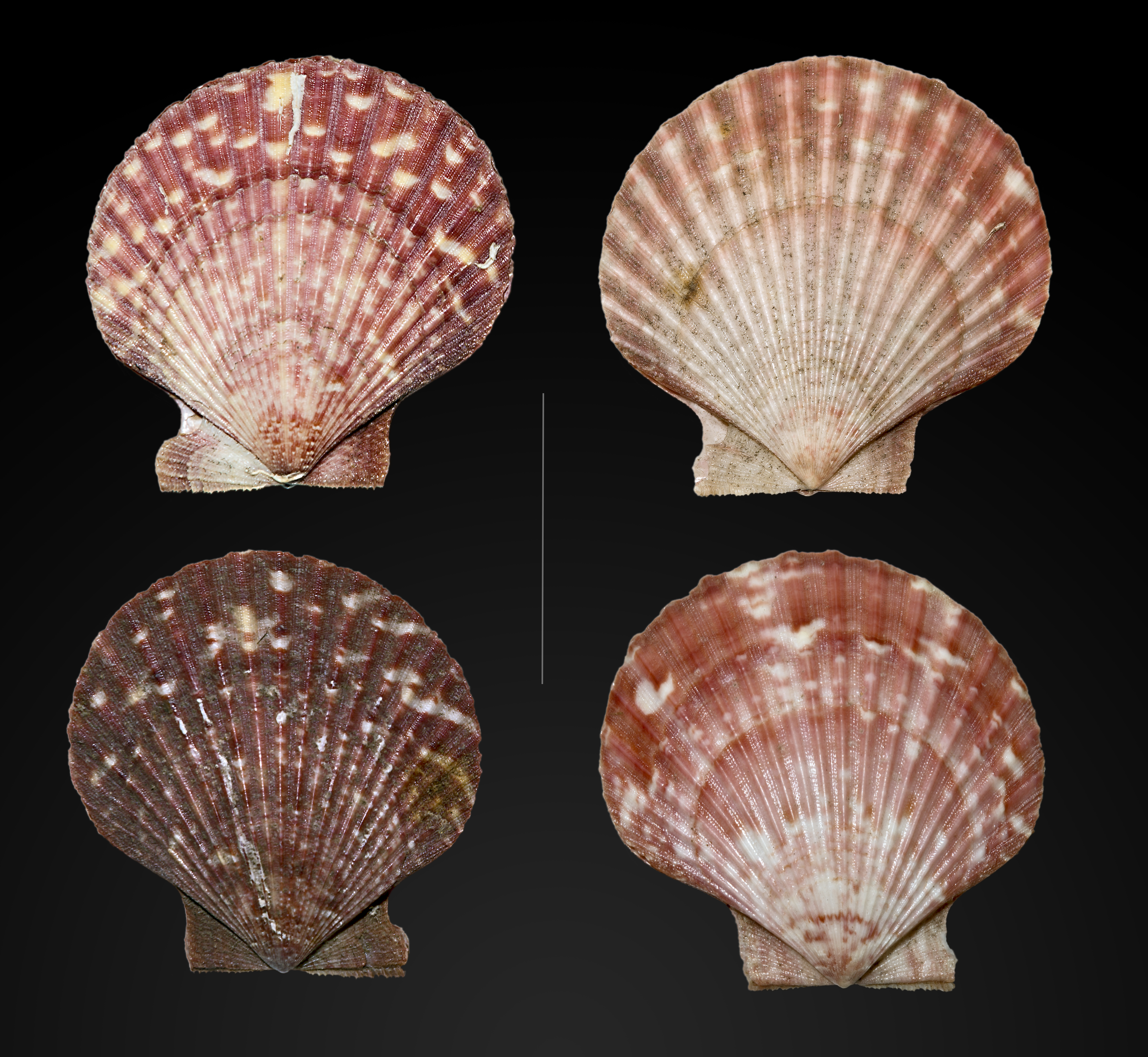
Aequipecten opercularis

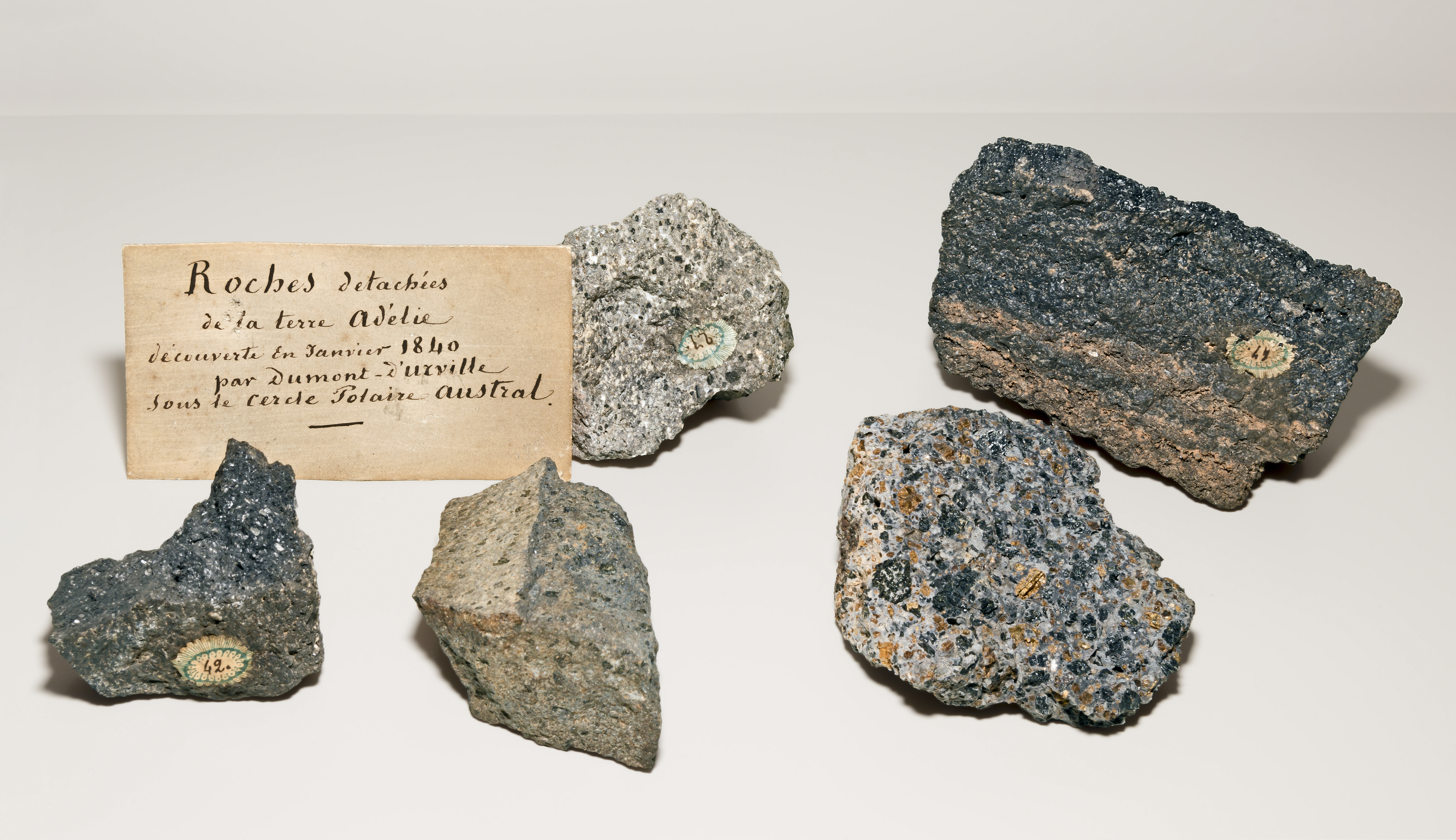
Rocks of Adélie Land MHNT

== Bibliography ==
- Registres en ligne des anciens élèves de l'École polytechnique : matricule de Gaston Rocquemaurel.
- Jean-Philippe Zanco, L'héritage oublié de Dumont d'Urville et des explorateurs du Pacifique : les voyages de Gaston de Roquemaurel, 1837-1854, colloque Lapérouse et les explorateurs français du Pacifique, Musée de la Marine, 17-18 octobre 2008.
- Stéphanie Leclerc-Caffarel, Jean-Philippe Zanco, "A disillusioned explorer : Gaston de Rocquemaurel or the culture of the French Naval Scholars during the first part of the 19th century", Terrae Incognitae vol. 45 Issue 2, octobre 2013.
- Hubert Sagnières, Routes Nouvelles, Cotes Inconnues, Flammarion, 2023, ISBN 9782080428448
- Camille Lavoillotte, « Rencontrer l'Autre. La collection d'objets polynésiens de Gaston Rocquemaurel au Muséum d'histoire naturelle de Toulouse », Mémoire de master, Université de Toulouse II Jean-Jaurès, juillet 2024.
