= Mount Jacquinot =

Mountain in Antarctica

Mount Jacquinot (English: /ʒækɪˈnoʊ/ zhak-ih-NOH, French: [ʒakino]; 63°22′S 57°53′W) is a pyramidal peak, 475 metres (1,560 ft) high, with exposed rock on its north side, lying 3 miles (5 km) south of Cape Legoupil and 1 mile (1.6 km) east of Huon Bay, on the north side of Trinity Peninsula, Antarctica. It was discovered by a French expedition, 1837–40, under Captain Jules Dumont d'Urville, who named it for Lieutenant Charles Jacquinot, the commander of the expedition corvette Zelée.

There was some controversy regarding claims of who found the continent first — Edward Bransfield or Nathaniel Palmer. In these debates, Mount Jacquinot figured prominently.

Every year, Chilean Army personnel of the General Bernardo O´Higgins Riquelme Base makes the ascent to this mountain as part of their training. Estimated time of ascension under normal conditions reaches approximately one hour.

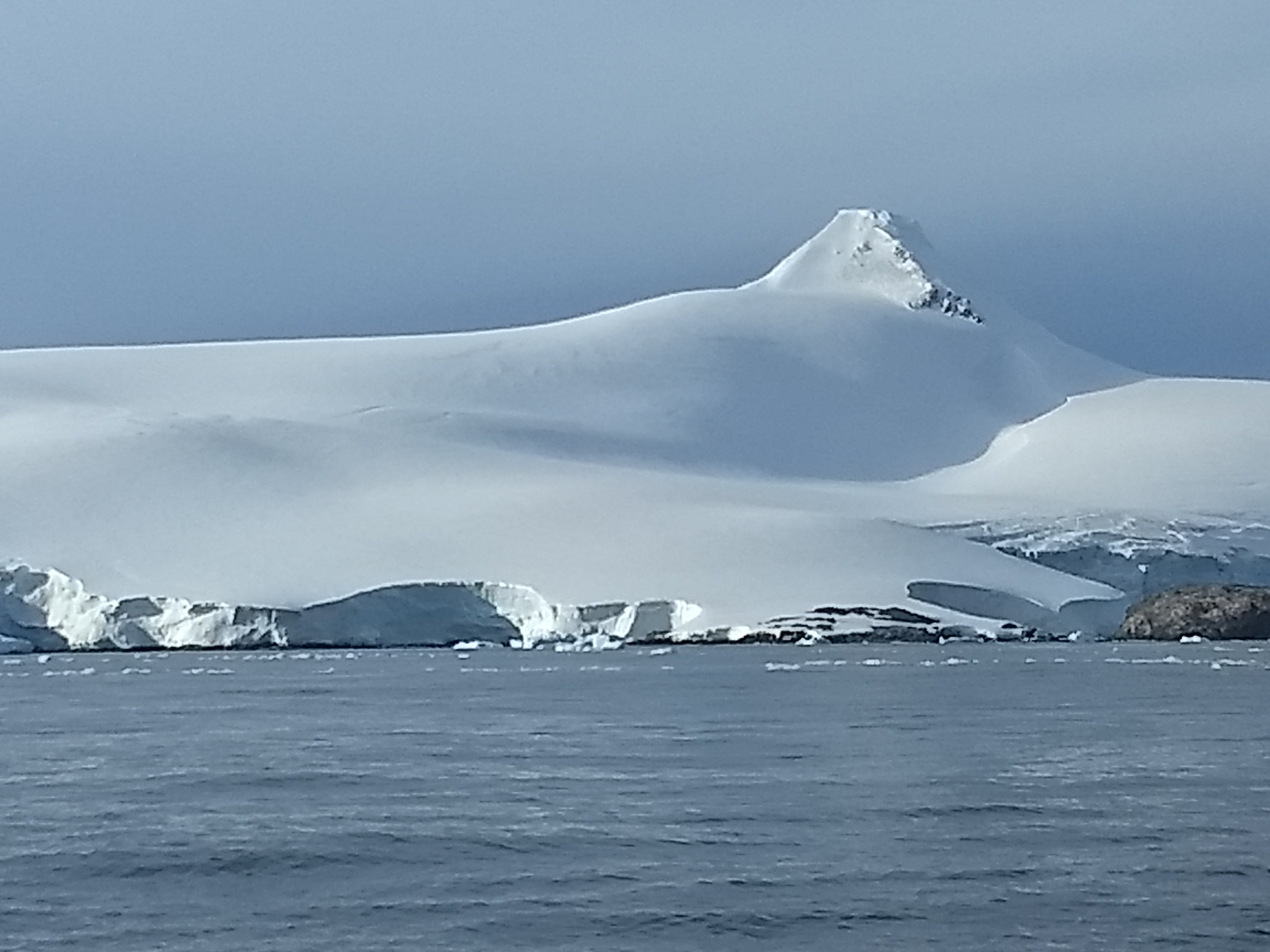
Monte Jacquinot ubicado en la peninsula Antartica

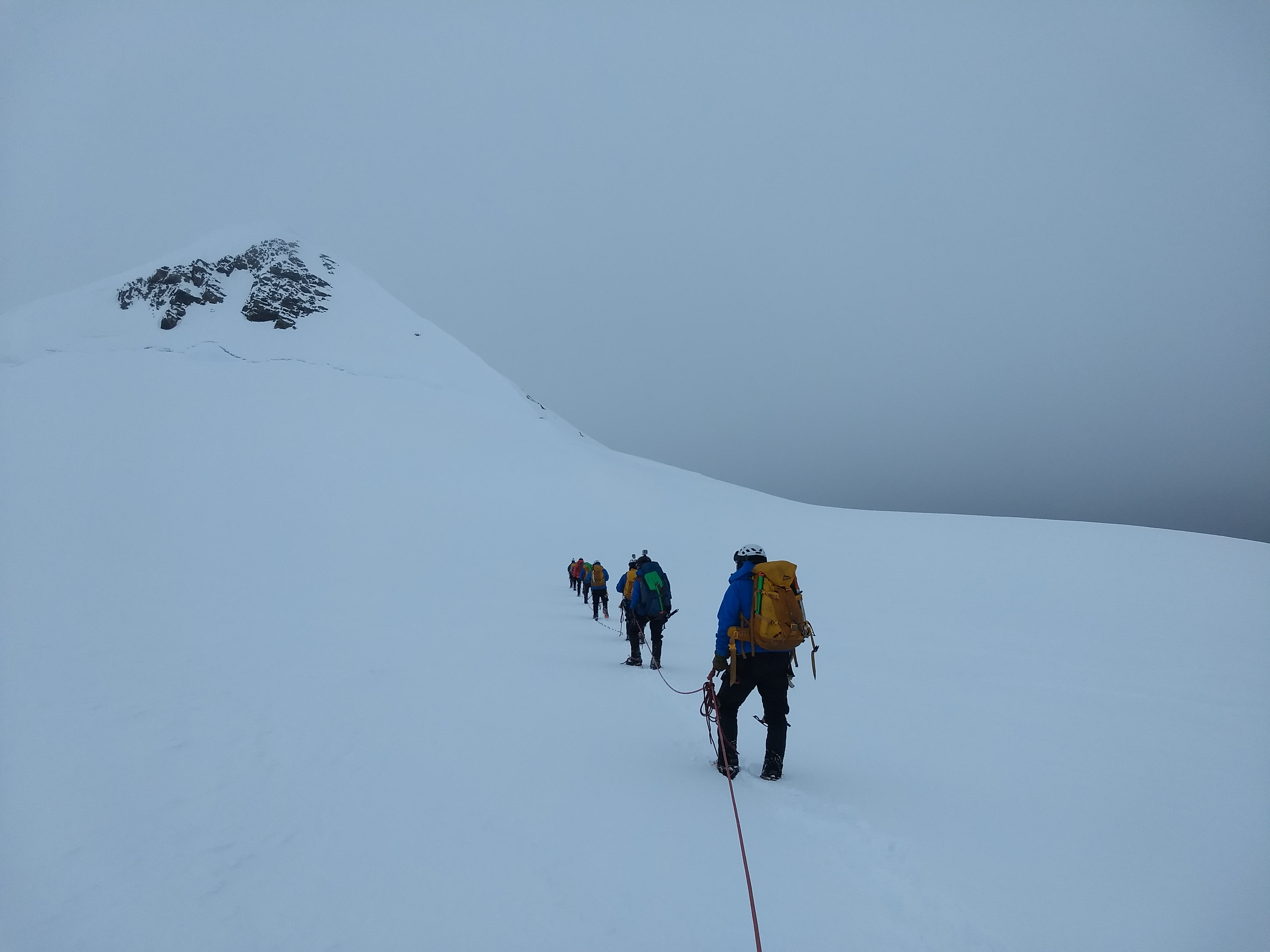
ASCENT TO MONTE JACQUINOT 2019
