= Srednogorie Heights =

Mountains in Antarctica

- Massif
- Location within Antarctica
- Coordinates: 63°37′00″S 58°42′30″W
- Location: Trinity Peninsula, Graham Land

Srednogorie Heights (63°37′00″S 58°42′30″W) are the heights rising to 1220 m (Mount Ignatiev) on the northwest side of Trinity Peninsula, Antarctic Peninsula.

== Location ==
Trinity Peninsula, Antarctic Peninsula. Srednogorie Heights towards northwest end

Srednogorie Heights are in Graham Land, facing the Bransfield Strait to the north. They are situated east of Bone Bay, west of Louis-Philippe Plateau, north of Russell West Glacier and south of Malorad Glacier. They extend 7.5 kilometres (4.7 mi) in an east-west direction and 7 kilometres (4.3 mi) in a north-south direction. The heights are named after Sredna Gora Mountains in central Bulgaria.

== Features ==
Features, from west to east, include

=== Zanoge Hill ===
63°34′55″S 58°46′05″W. An ice-covered hill rising to 710 metres (2,330 ft) high and forming the northwest extremity of Srednogorie Heights. Situated 6.53 kilometres (4.06 mi) northwest of Mount Ignatiev, 2.6 kilometres (1.6 mi) north of Greben Hill, 2.96 kilometres (1.84 mi) east-northeast of Hanson Hill, 4.78 kilometres (2.97 mi) southwest of Eremiya Hill and 4.41 kilometres (2.74 mi) west of Corner Peak. Surmounting Malorad Glacier to the east and north. Named after the settlement of Zanoge in Western Bulgaria.

=== Greben Hill ===
63°36′19″S 58°46′11″W. A hill rising to 924 metres (3,031 ft) high in Srednogorie Heights. Situated 2.81 kilometres (1.75 mi) north-northwest of Ledenika Peak, 5.12 kilometres (3.18 mi) southwest of Corner Peak and 3.42 kilometres (2.13 mi) southeast of Hanson Hill. Surmounting Malorad Glacier to the north. Named after Greben Mountain in Western Bulgaria.

=== Ledenika Peak ===
63°37′42″S 58°44′48″W. A peak rising to 1,020 metres (3,350 ft) high in Srednogorie Heights. Situated 2.68 kilometres (1.67 mi) southwest of Razvigor Peak, 6 kilometres (3.7 mi) southeast of Hanson Hill, 6.66 kilometres (4.14 mi) east of Wimple Dome and 10.89 kilometres (6.77 mi) north-northwest of Sirius Knoll. Surmounting Malorad Glacier to the north and Russell West Glacier to the south. Named after Ledenika Cave in Northwestern Bulgaria.

=== Razvigor Peak ===
63°36′53″S 58°42′07″W. A peak rising to 1,110 metres (3,640 ft) high in Srednogorie Heights. Situated 2.49 kilometres (1.55 mi) west-southwest of Mount Ignatiev, 3.7 kilometres (2.3 mi) south-southwest of Corner Peak, 6.86 kilometres (4.26 mi) east-southeast of Hanson Hill, 2.68 kilometres (1.67 mi) northeast of Ledenika Peak and 11.76 kilometres (7.31 mi) north of Sirius Knoll. Surmounting Malorad Glacier to the north and Russell West Glacier to the south. Named after the settlement of Razvigorovo in Northeastern Bulgaria.

=== Mount Ignatiev ===
63°36′37″S 58°39′10″W. A peak rising to 1,220 metres (4,000 ft) high in Srednogorie Heights. Situated 3.3 kilometres (2.1 mi) south-southeast of Corner Peak, 8.96 kilometres (5.57 mi) east-southeast of Hanson Hill, 12.1 kilometres (7.5 mi) north of Sirius Knoll and 7.17 kilometres (4.46 mi) southwest of Crown Peak. Surmounting Trajan Gate to the east, Malorad Glacier to the north and Russell West Glacier to the south. Named after the settlement of Graf Ignatievo in Southern Bulgaria, in connection with the Russian diplomat Count Nikolay Pavlovich Ignatyev (1832-1908).

=== Daveri Hill ===
63°35′27″S 58°38′56″W. An ice-covered hill rising to 834 metres (2,736 ft) high at the northeast extremity of Srednogorie Heights. Situated 2.17 kilometres (1.35 mi) north of Mount Ignatiev, 1.74 kilometres (1.08 mi) southeast of Corner Peak, 5.4 kilometres (3.4 mi) southwest of Crown Peak and 2.89 kilometres (1.80 mi) west-northwest of Lambuh Knoll. Surmounting Malorad Glacier to the north. Named after the settlement of Daveri in Northern Bulgaria.

=== Lambuh Knoll ===
63°35′55″S 58°35′36″W. An ice-covered hill rising to 924 metres (3,031 ft) high between Louis-Philippe Plateau and Srednogorie Heights. Situated at the north entrance to Trajan Gate, 3.21 kilometres (1.99 mi) east-northeast of Mount Ignatiev, 4.6 kilometres (2.9 mi) south by west of Crown Peak, 6.9 kilometres (4.3 mi) southwest of Lardigo Peak and 13.78 kilometres (8.56 mi) north-northeast of Sirius Knoll. Surmounting Malorad Glacier to the northwest. Named after the settlement of Lambuh in Southern Bulgaria.

== Sources ==
REMA Explorer
The Reference Elevation Model of Antarctica (REMA) gives ice surface measurements of most of the continent. When a feature is ice-covered, the ice surface will differ from the underlying rock surface and will change over time. To see ice surface contours and elevation of a feature as of the last REMA update,
- Open the Antarctic REMA Explorer
- Enter the feature's coordinates in the box at the top left that says "Find address or place", then press enter
  The coordinates should be in DMS format, e.g. 65°05'03"S 64°01'02"W. If you only have degrees and minutes, you may not be able to locate the feature.
- Hover over the icons at the left of the screen
- Find "Hillshade" and click on that
  In the bottom right of the screen, set "Shading Factor" to 0 to get a clearer image
- Find "Contour" and click on that
  In the "Contour properties" box, select Contour Interval = 1m
  You can zoom in and out to see the ice surface contours of the feature and nearby features
- Find "Identify" and click on that
  Click the point where the contour lines seem to indicate the top of the feature
  The "Identify" box will appear to the top left. The Orthometric height is the elevation of the ice surface of the feature at this point.

- Antarctic REMA Explorer (Digital Elevation Models created by the Polar Geospatial Center from Maxar imagery), Polar Geospatial Center, University of Minnesota, 2019
- "Daveri Hill", Composite Gazetteer of Antarctica, Scientific Committee on Antarctic Research
- Graham Land and South Shetland Islands, BAS: British Antarctic Survey, 2005
- "Greben Hill", Composite Gazetteer of Antarctica, Scientific Committee on Antarctic Research
- "Lambuh Knoll", Composite Gazetteer of Antarctica, Scientific Committee on Antarctic Research
- "Ledenika Peak", Composite Gazetteer of Antarctica, Scientific Committee on Antarctic Research
- "Mount Ignatiev", Composite Gazetteer of Antarctica, Scientific Committee on Antarctic Research
- "Razvigor Peak", Composite Gazetteer of Antarctica, Scientific Committee on Antarctic Research
- "Srednogorie Heights", Composite Gazetteer of Antarctica, Scientific Committee on Antarctic Research
- Trinity Peninsula (PDF) (Scale 1:250000 topographic map No. 5697), Institut für Angewandte Geodäsie and British Antarctic Survey, 1996, archived from the original (PDF) on 23 September 2015
- "Zanoge Hill", Composite Gazetteer of Antarctica, Scientific Committee on Antarctic Research

This article includes information from the Antarctic Place-names Commission of Bulgaria which is used with permission.
