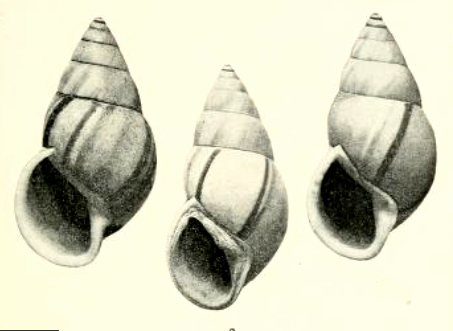
- Shells of Amphidromus buluanensis

Scientific classification
- Kingdom: Animalia
- Phylum: Mollusca
- Class: Gastropoda
- Order: Stylommatophora
- Family: Camaenidae
- Genus: Amphidromus
- Species: A. buluanensis

Binomial name
- Amphidromus buluanensis Bartsch, 1917

Synonyms
- Amphidromus maculiferus bartschi Laidlaw & Solem, 1961 junior subjective synonym; Amphidromus maculiferus buluanensis Bartsch, 1917 superseded rank; Amphidromus maculiferus f. buluanensis Bartsch, 1917 superseded rank; Amphidromus maculiferus webbi Bartsch, 1919 (invalid: junior homonym of Amphidromus webbi Fulton, 1907; A. bartschi is a replacement name)

= Amphidromus buluanensis =

Species of tree snail

Amphidromus buluanensis is a species of air-breathing tree snail, an arboreal gastropod mollusk in the family Camaenidae.

== Description ==
The length of the shell attains 66.2 mm; its diameter 33.4 mm

(Original description) The elongate-conical shell shows seven moderately rounded whorls, appressed at the apex and has moderately constricted sutures. The initial two whorls exhibit dark filiform markings along the suture, while subsequent whorls are pale brown, occasionally displaying retractive streaks of light brown or dull white. These variceal streaks intensify significantly on the final two whorls. Spotting is entirely absent. The aperture is typical.

== Distribution ==
This sinistral species is endemic to Mindanao, the Philippines.
