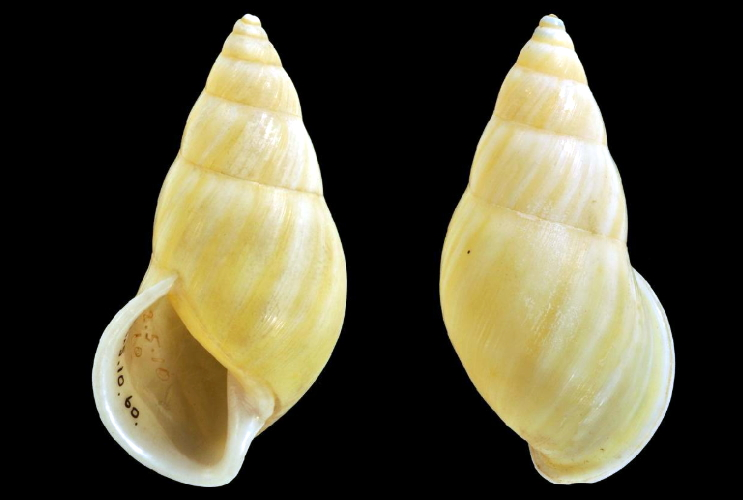
- Shell of Amphidromus multicolor gracilior (specimen at the Natural History Museum, London)

Scientific classification
- Kingdom: Animalia
- Phylum: Mollusca
- Class: Gastropoda
- Order: Stylommatophora
- Family: Camaenidae
- Genus: Amphidromus
- Species: A. multicolor

Binomial name
- Amphidromus multicolor Möllendorff, 1893

Synonyms
- Amphidromus maculiferus multicolor Möllendorff, 1893 (basionym)

= Amphidromus multicolor =

Species of tree snail

Amphidromus multicolor is a species of air-breathing tree snail, an arboreal gastropod mollusk in the family Camaenidae.

Subspecies

- Amphidromus multicolor boholensis Bartsch, 1917
- Amphidromus multicolor gracilior Fulton, 1896 (synonyms: Amphidromus maculiferus gracilior Fulton, 1896 ·superseded combination; Amphidromus maculiferus strigatus Fulton, 1896 · (junior synonym); Amphidromus maculiferus var. gracilior Fulton, 1896 (basionym); Amphidromus maculiferus var. gracillimus Kobelt, 1914 junior subjective synonym; Amphidromus maculiferus var. strigata Fulton, 1896; Amphidromus nigrofilosus Rochebrune, 1882 (uncertain synonym)
- Amphidromus multicolor multicolor Möllendorff, 1893
- Amphidromus multicolor samarensis Bartsch, 1917

== Description ==
(Original description in Latin) The shell appears smaller and yellowish. It is painted with reddish-brown, brown, and greenish streaks, often displaying a flammulated pattern.

(Description as Amphidromus multicolor gracilior) The shell is white and features oblique, semi-transparent, pale horn-colored stripes. The apical whorls are generally filleted.

(Description as Amphidromus nigrofilosus) The shell is nearly covered, perforate, and ovate-pyramidal, exhibiting a sinistral coiling and obsolete striations. Its color is white and shining, obliquely painted with pale corneous lamellae. The spire appears elongate, with a very minutely crenulate suture. Comprising seven subconvex whorls, the last four are sutured with an intense black line, and the last whorl is compressed at the base. The aperture is broadly subquadrangular and somewhat twisted at the columella. The peristome is straight, white, callous, and expanded throughout; the columellar margin is strongly calloused and recurved, displaying a violaceous hue.

== Distribution ==
This species is endemic to the Philippines.
