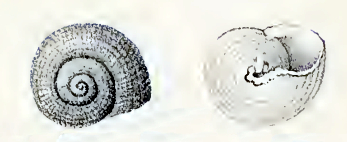
- Drawing showing two views of a shell of Clanculus samoensis

Scientific classification
- Kingdom: Animalia
- Phylum: Mollusca
- Class: Gastropoda
- Subclass: Vetigastropoda
- Order: Trochida
- Superfamily: Trochoidea
- Family: Trochidae
- Genus: Clanculus
- Species: C. samoensis

Binomial name
- Clanculus samoensis (Hombron & Jacquinot, 1848)

Synonyms
- Clanculus samoensis (Rousseau in Hombron, J.B. & C.H. Jacquinot, 1877); Trochus (Monodonta) atropurpureus Gould, 1849; Trochus samoensis Rousseau in Hombron, J.B. & C.H. Jacquinot, 1877

= Clanculus samoensis =

Species of gastropod

Clanculus samoensis is a species of sea snail, a marine gastropod mollusk in the family Trochidae, the top snails.

== Description ==
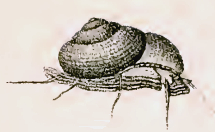
Drawing of the animal and shell of Clanculus samoensis

The height of the shell attains 7 mm (0.28 in), its diameter 9 mm (0.35 in). The depressed, umbilicate shell has conoid shape. It is, dark purplish or ferrugineous brown, unicolored, the apex carmine. The shell contains six convex granose-lirate whorls. The sutures are narrowly subcanaliculate. The body whorl is rounded at the periphery and abruptly briefly deflected anteriorly. It is encircled by 16 or 17 finely, very regularly but feebly granose lirae, which are wider on the base. The aperture is rounded. The outer and basal lips are regularly curved, thickened and finely crenulated within. The columella deeply enters the profound umbilicus, bearing a minute denticle above and at the base. The profound umbilicus is smooth within, bordered and constricted by a marginal rib bearing about four white teeth, the largest near to the parietal wall of the aperture.

== Distribution ==
This marine species occurs in the Red Sea, in the Central and East Indian Ocean; off Indo-China, Indo-Malaysia, Oceania, the Philippines and Australia (Northern Territory, Queensland, Western Australia).
