= Marescot Point =

Headland in Antarctica

- Location within Antarctica

Geography
- Coordinates: 63°29′S 58°35′W

Marescot Point (63°29′S 58°35′W) is a small but distinctive low rocky point projecting north from Trinity Peninsula, Antarctica, 2.5 nautical miles (4.6 km; 2.9 mi) east of Thanaron Point.

== Location ==
Trinity Peninsula, Antarctic Peninsula. Schmidt Peninsula towards northeast end

Marescot Point is on the north shore of Trinity Peninsula, which itself is the tip of the Antarctic Peninsula. It faces Astrolabe Island in the Bransfield Strait on a relatively straight stretch of coast between Bone Bay to the west and Lafond Bay to the east. The Louis Philippe Plateau is inland, to the south. Inland and coastal features between Bone Bay and Lafond Bay include, from west to east, Hanson Hill, Thanaron Point, Corner Peak, Crown Peak and Marescot Ridge. Offshore features of the coastal stretch include Duparc Rocks, Hombron Rocks and Jacquinot Rocks.

== Name ==
"Marescot Point" is a reidentification of Captain Jules Dumont d'Urville's original "Cap Marescot," named after Jacques Marescot du Thilleul (1808–39), an ensign on the Astrolabe during d'Urville's expedition (1837–40), who died during the voyage.

== Marescot Ridge ==
63°32′S 58°32′W. A ridge consisting of numerous ice-covered hills, the highest being Crown Peak 1,185 metres (3,888 ft) high at the south end of the ridge. Located 2 nautical miles (3.7 km; 2.3 mi) inland from Marescot Point along the northwest coast of Trinity Peninsula. This ridge was probably observed by Captain Jules Dumont d'Urville on February 27, 1838, when he named nearby "Cap Marescot" (now Marescot Point). Following its 1946 survey, the FIDS gave the name Marescot Ridge to this ridge, thinking it to be the coastal feature named by d'Urville. The name Marescot has been retained for both the ridge and the nearby point.

=== Crown Peak ===
63°34′S 58°33′W. An ice-covered peak 1,185 metres (3,888 ft) high topped by a conspicuous crown-shaped ice formation. It forms the highest summit and the south end of Marescot Ridge and lies 10 nautical miles (19 km; 12 mi) east of Cape Roquemaurel. Named by the FIDS following their survey of the area in 1946.

=== Nove Peak ===
63°32′59″S 58°34′12″W An ice-covered peak rising to 1,157 metres (3,796 ft) high in the south part of Marescot Ridge. Situated 1.07 kilometres (0.66 mi) north of Crown Peak, 6.57 kilometres (4.08 mi) northeast of Corner Peak, 6.8 kilometres (4.2 mi) south by east of Marescot Point and 4.52 kilometres (2.81 mi) west-northwest of Lardigo Peak. Surmounting the head of Malorad Glacier to the SW. Named after the ancient Roman town of Nove in Northern Bulgaria.

=== Eremiya Hill ===
63°32′45″S 58°37′46″W An ice-covered hill rising to 863 metres (2,831 ft) high in the west part of Marescot Ridge. Situated 3.48 kilometres (2.16 mi) west-northwest of Crown Peak, 4.83 kilometres (3.00 mi) north-northeast of Corner Peak, 6 kilometres (3.7 mi) southeast of Thanaron Point and 5.89 kilometres (3.66 mi) southwest of Bardarevo Hill. Surmounting Malorad Glacier to the SW. Named after the settlement of Eremiya in Western Bulgaria.

=== Bardarevo Hill ===
63°30′58″S 58°31′53″W An ice-covered hill rising to 677 metres (2,221 ft) high in the north part of Marescot Ridge. Situated 5.1 kilometres (3.2 mi) north-northeast of Crown Peak and 4.1 kilometres (2.5 mi) southeast of Marescot Point. Named after the settlement of Bardarevo in Northeastern Bulgaria.

=== Stubel Hill ===
63°30′06″S 58°31′48″W An ice-covered hill rising to 479 metres (1,572 ft) high and forming the north extremity of Marescot Ridge. Situated 1.61 kilometres (1.00 mi) north of Bardarevo Hill, 6.65 kilometres (4.13 mi) north-northeast of Crown Peak and 3.2 kilometres (2.0 mi) east-southeast of Marescot Point. Overlooking Bransfield Strait to the N. Named after the settlement of Stubel in Northwestern Bulgaria.

== Nearby features ==
Features along the coast east of Marescot Point include, from west to east.

=== Hanson Hill ===
63°35′S 58°49′W. A snow-covered hill 900 metres (3,000 ft) high with two lower summits, one to the north and one to the south, standing 4 nautical miles (7.4 km; 4.6 mi) southeast of Cape Roquemaurel. This hill was roughly charted but left unnamed by the French expedition under Captain Jules Dumont d'Urville in March 1838. In 1948, the UK-APC gave the name "Thanaron Hill" to the feature. Their action followed a 1946 search by the FIDS which failed to identify a coastal point in the vicinity to which d'Urville had given the name "Cap Thanaron." The latter feature (now Thanaron Point) was subsequently identified. In 1963, the UK Antarctic Place-Names Committee (UK-APC) renamed the hill described after Thomas A. Hanson, FIDS surveyor at Hope Bay, 1957-59.

=== Malorad Glacier ===
63°34′00″S 58°43′00″W. A 14 kilometres (8.7 mi) long and 10.5 kilometres (6.5 mi) wide glacier. Situated northeast of Hanson Hill, north of Srednogorie Heights, northwest of Louis-Philippe Plateau and southwest of Marescot Ridge. Draining northwestwards to enter Bransfield Strait east of Cape Roquemaurel. Named after the settlement of Malorad in Northwestern Bulgaria.

=== Thanaron Point ===
63°30′S 58°40′W. A rock point 8 nautical miles (15 km; 9.2 mi) east-northeast of Cape Roquemaurel. Named in 1838 by the French expedition under Captain Jules Dumont d'Urville after Lieutenant Charles Thanaron of the expedition ship Zélée.

=== Corner Peak ===
63°35′S 58°39′W. A pyramidal peak 930 metres (3,050 ft) high with considerable rock exposed on its north face. Located 8 nautical miles (15 km; 9.2 mi) east-southeast of Cape Roquemaurel, it marks a corner in the broad glacial valley which rises immediately to the southeast and fans out northwest to form a piedmont ice sheet on the northwest side of Trinity Peninsula. Named by the Falkland Islands Dependencies Survey (FIDS) following a 1946 survey.

== Rocks ==
Rocks in the Bransfield Strait just offshore from the coast near Marescot Point include:

=== Duparc Rocks ===
63°31′S 58°50′W. A group of rocks between 1 and 2 nautical miles (1.9 and 3.7 km; 1.2 and 2.3 mi) off the coast, 3 nautical miles (5.6 km; 3.5 mi) northeast of Cape Roquemaurel. Mapped from surveys by FIDS (1960–61). Named by UK-APC for Louis Duparc, French naval officer on the Astrolabe during her Antarctic voyage (1837–40).

=== Hombron Rocks ===
63°28′S 58°42′W. Rocks awash lying off Thanaron Point. Discovered by a French expedition, 1837–40, under Captain Jules Dumont d'Urville, and named by him for Jacques Hombron, a surgeon with the expedition. The rocks were surveyed by the FIDS in 1946.

=== Jacquinot Rocks ===
63°26′S 58°24′W. Group of rocks about midway between Hombron Rocks and Cape Ducorps and 1 nautical mile (1.9 km; 1.2 mi) off the north coast of Trinity Peninsula. Charted in 1946 by the FIDS who named the rocks for Honoré Jacquinot, surgeon with the French expedition under Captain Jules Dumont d'Urville which explored this coast in 1838.

== Sources ==
- Alberts, Fred G., ed. (1995), Geographic Names of the Antarctic (PDF) (2 ed.), United States Board on Geographic Names This article incorporates public domain material from websites or documents of the United States Board on Geographic Names.

REMA Explorer
The Reference Elevation Model of Antarctica (REMA) gives ice surface measurements of most of the continent. When a feature is ice-covered, the ice surface will differ from the underlying rock surface and will change over time. To see ice surface contours and elevation of a feature as of the last REMA update,
- Open the Antarctic REMA Explorer
- Enter the feature's coordinates in the box at the top left that says "Find address or place", then press enter
  The coordinates should be in DMS format, e.g. 65°05'03"S 64°01'02"W. If you only have degrees and minutes, you may not be able to locate the feature.
- Hover over the icons at the left of the screen
- Find "Hillshade" and click on that
  In the bottom right of the screen, set "Shading Factor" to 0 to get a clearer image
- Find "Contour" and click on that
  In the "Contour properties" box, select Contour Interval = 1m
  You can zoom in and out to see the ice surface contours of the feature and nearby features
- Find "Identify" and click on that
  Click the point where the contour lines seem to indicate the top of the feature
  The "Identify" box will appear to the top left. The Orthometric height is the elevation of the ice surface of the feature at this point.

- Antarctic REMA Explorer (Digital Elevation Models created by the Polar Geospatial Center from Maxar imagery), Polar Geospatial Center, University of Minnesota, 2019
- "Bardarevo Hill", Composite Gazetteer of Antarctica, Scientific Committee on Antarctic Research
- "Eremiya Hill", Composite Gazetteer of Antarctica, Scientific Committee on Antarctic Research
- Graham Land and South Shetland Islands, BAS: British Antarctic Survey, 2005
- "Malorad Glacier", Composite Gazetteer of Antarctica, Scientific Committee on Antarctic Research
- "Nove Peak", Composite Gazetteer of Antarctica, Scientific Committee on Antarctic Research
- "Stubel Hill", Composite Gazetteer of Antarctica, Scientific Committee on Antarctic Research
- Trinity Peninsula (PDF) (Scale 1:250000 topographic map No. 5697), Institut für Angewandte Geodäsie and British Antarctic Survey, 1996, archived from the original (PDF) on 23 September 2015

This article incorporates public domain material from websites or documents of the United States Geological Survey.
