= Charles Jacquinot =

French Naval officer

- Born: Charles Hector Jacquinot; 4 March 1796; Nevers, France
- Died: 17 November 1879 (aged 83)
- Occupation: Mariner
- Spouse: Claire-Fortunée Roze (m. 1832)
- Children: 1

Charles Hector Jacquinot (English: /ʒækɪˈnoʊ/ zhak-ih-NOH, French: [ʃaʁl ʒakino]; 4 March 1796 – 17 November 1879) was a mariner, best known for his role in early French Antarctic surveys.

== Biography ==
Nevers-born Jacquinot served with Jules Dumont d'Urville in the Mediterranean, and as an ensign on Louis Isidore Duperrey's 1822–1825 scientific circumnavigation in the Coquille. In 1826–1829 he sailed again with d'Urville, this time on the Astrolabe (the Coquille renamed), in a circumnavigation that visited New Zealand, Tonga, Fiji and other islands in the Pacific, and he participated in the recovery of relics of the lost expedition of Jean-François de Galaup, comte de Lapérouse from the Santa Cruz Islands. For this voyage he was awarded the Cross of Honor.

During d'Urville's second expedition from 1837–1840 he was commander of the expedition corvette Zelée, on which his younger brother, Honoré Jacquinot, also served as a surgeon and naturalist and his cousin Charles Thanaron as second lieutenant. The ships departed from Toulon in September 1837 on a mission to survey the Straits of Magellan, then head to the Weddell Sea. After d'Urvilles death, he compiled and edited much the 24 volume "Voyage au Pole Sud et dans Oceane", the official account of the expedition, working together with Clément Adrien Vincendon-Dumoulin.

Jacquinot was eventually appointed Vice Admiral, and was in command at Piraeus, Greece from 1854 and 1855, during the Crimean War. For this he was awarded the Greek Order of the Redeemer.

He died soon after retiring from the Naval General Staff in 1879. He was said to have been a modest man, and confirmed this by asking to be buried without military honors.

Mount Jacquinot was named for him by d'Urville, who was said to have been his best friend.
