= James Ross Island Volcanic Group =

Group of geological formations in Antarctica

- Stratigraphic range: Cenozoic
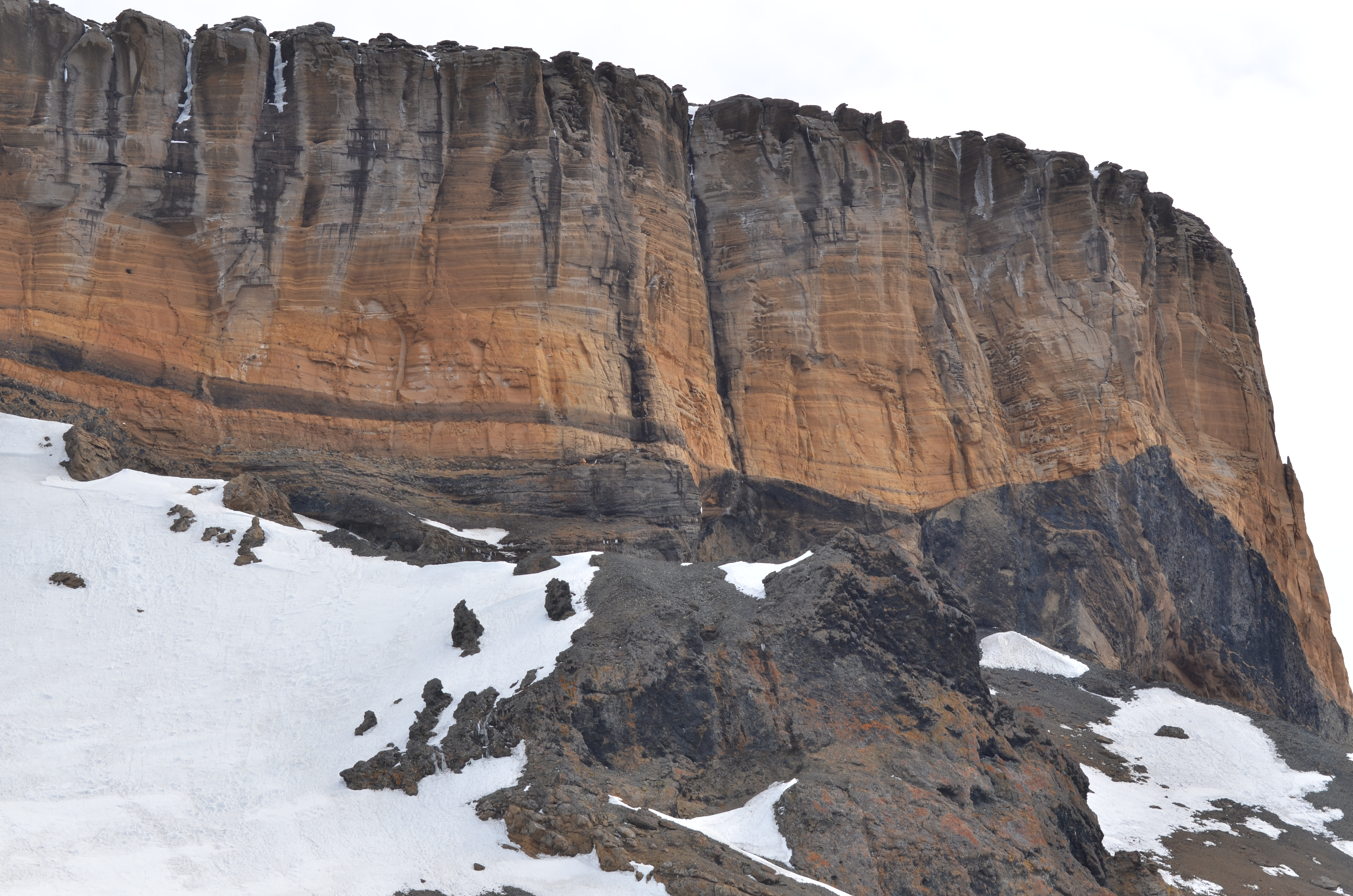
- Tuff cliffs of Brown Bluff on the Tabarin Peninsula
- Type: Group

Lithology
- Primary: Alkali basalts
- Other: Hawaiites, benmoreites, mugearites

Location
- Region: Antarctica

Type section
- Named for: James Ross Island

The James Ross Island Volcanic Group is a stratigraphic unit of Cenozoic age distributed on James Ross Island and Vega Island of the James Ross Island group, the Tabarin and Trinity peninsulas of Graham Land and surrounding islands in the Prince Gustav and Antarctic sounds.

The volcanic group consists predominantly of alkali basalts with minor hawaiites, benmoreites and mugearites. They are interpreted to have been deposited by volcanic eruptions in an extensional back-arc setting after subduction had ceased along the western margin of the Antarctic Peninsula. K–Ar dating of these rocks suggest that they were erupted from about 7 million years ago up until about a few hundred thousand years ago. However, volcanic rocks as young as only a few thousand years old may exist on James Ross Island.

Rocks of the James Ross Island Volcanic Group comprise Surtseyan tuff cones and Strombolian cinder cones, as well as lava deltas and overlying subaerial lava flows. The dominating feature of the James Ross Island Volcanic Group is Mount Haddington, a massive shield volcano of Miocene-to-Pliocene age on James Ross Island.

== Subdivisions ==
The James Ross Island Volcanic Group includes the following geological formations:

- Cape Lachman Formation
- Cape Well-met Formation
- Dobson Dome Formation
- Donnachie Cliffs Formation
- Ekelof Point Formation
- Forster Cliffs Formation
- Hamilton Formation
- Jefford Point Formation
- Johnson Mesa Formation
- Jonkers Mesa Formation
- Keltie Head Formation
- Kipling Mesa Formation
- Lachman Crags Formation
- Lookalike Peaks Formation
- Palisade Nunatak Formation
- Patalamon Mesa Formation
- Sandwich Bluff Formation
- Smellie Peak Formation
- Stickle Ridge Formation
- Sungold Hill Formation
- Taylor Bluff Formation
- Terrapin Hill Formation
- Tumbledown Formation
- Vertigo Cliffs Formation

== Features ==
The James Ross Island Volcanic Group includes the following volcanic features:

- Abel Nunatak
- Andersson Island
- Brown Bluff
- Buttress Hill
- Cain Nunatak
- Carlson Island
- Cockburn Island
- Corry Island
- Devil Island
- Dobson Dome
- Donnachie Cliff
- Eagle Island
  - Scree Peak
- Egg Island
- False Island Point
- Flett Buttress
- Förster Cliffs
- Gamma Hill
- Cape Gordon
- Mount Haddington
- Jonassen Island
- Keltie Head
- Lachman Crags
- Léal Bluff
- Lockyer Island
- Lomas Ridge
- Mahogany Bluff
- Cone Nunatak
- Organpipe Nunatak
- Palisade Nunatak
- Paulet Island
- Persson Island
- Cape Purvis
- Red Island
- Rosamel Island
- Sandwich Bluff
- Seacatch Nunataks
- Sentinel Buttress
- Stark Point
- Stickle Ridge
- Sungold Hill
- Tail Island
- Terrapin Hill
- Tongue Rocks
- Virgin Hill
- Vortex Island

== See also ==
- List of volcanoes in Antarctica
