= Eagle Island, Antarctica =

Island in Antarctica

Eagle Island
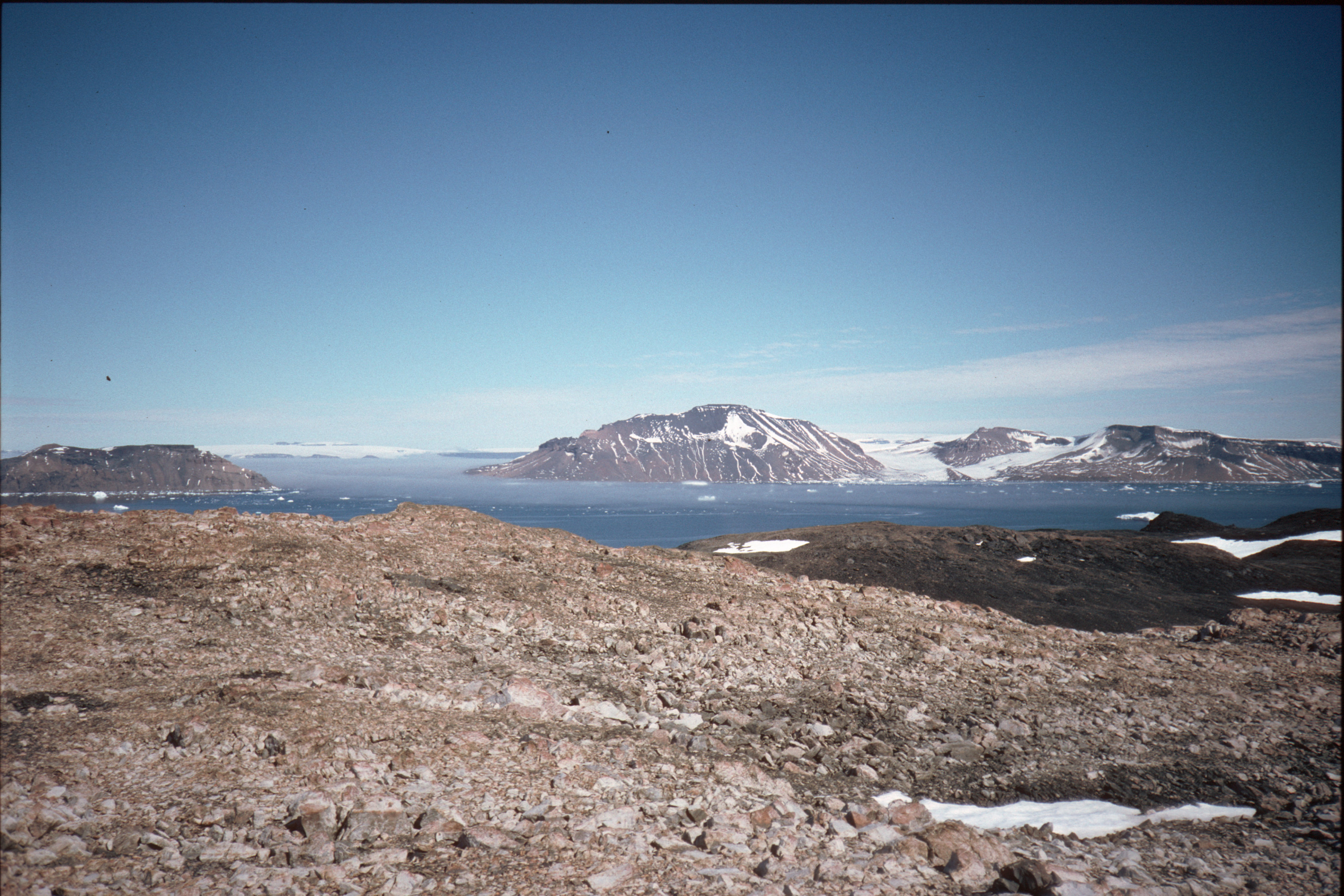
- Eagle Island seen from View Point

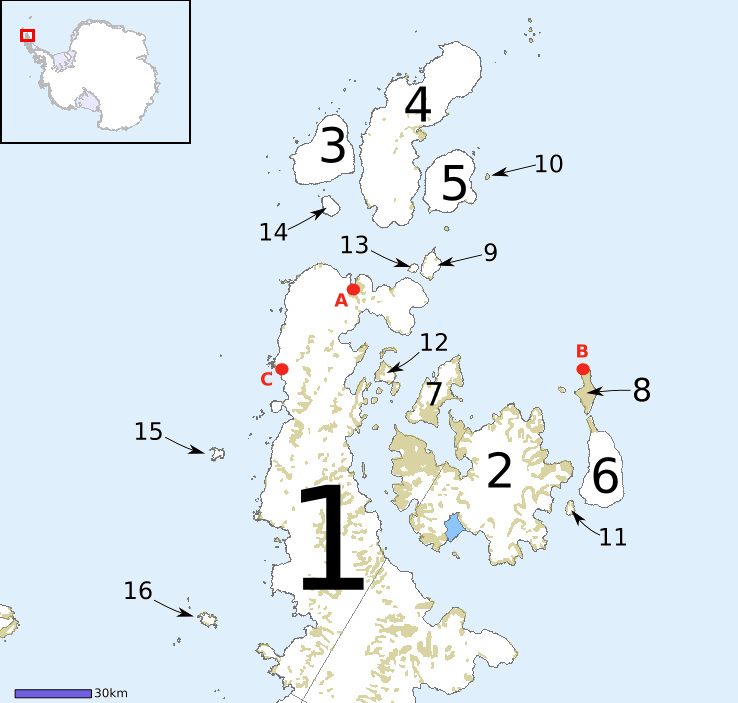
- Eagle Island (12)

- Location in Antarctica

Geography
- Location: Antarctica
- Coordinates: 63°40′S 57°29′W

Eagle Island (63°40′S 57°29′W) is an island 5 nautical miles (9.3 km; 5.8 mi) long and 4 nautical miles (7.4 km; 4.6 mi) wide, rising to 560 metres (1,840 ft) on the NE side. It is the largest island in the archipelago which lies between Trinity Peninsula and Vega Island. Eagle Island is separated from the Antarctic mainland by the 1.77 km wide Aripleri Passage. It is volcanic in origin, having been K-Ar dated 1.7 ± 0.2 and 2.0 ± 0.2 million years old. It forms part of the James Ross Island Volcanic Group.

== Location ==
Trinity Peninsula on Antarctic Peninsula. Eagle Island southeast of the tip

Eagle Island is in Graham Land, to the southeast of the Trinity Peninsula, which is the tip of the Antarctic Peninsula. Eyrie Bay and Duse Bay are to the north, and the south tip of Tabarin Peninsula is to the west. Erebus and Terror Gulf is to the southwest. Prince Gustav Channel to the south separates Eagle Island from Vega Island-

== Exploration and name ==
Eagle Island was probably first seen by a party under Johan Gunnar Andersson of the Swedish Antarctic Expedition (SwedAE), 1901–04. Eagle Island was charted in 1945 by the Falkland Islands Dependencies Survey (FIDS) and named after the ship Eagle, used by the FIDS.

== Melting events ==
During the Southern Hemisphere summer of 2019-2020 three melting events occurred on Trinity peninsula, in November 2019, January 2020, and particularly February 6–11, 2020, during which 106 millimeters of snow melted, forming melt ponds on Eagle Island. The nine day heatwave in early February 2020 melted about 20% of the island's snow cover.

== Features ==
=== The Horn ===
63°39′S 57°34′W. A hill, 220 metres (720 ft) high, with a sheer cliff of reddish rock on its west side, surmounting the northwest point of Eagle Island. Surveyed and named descriptively by the FIDS in 1945.

=== Scree Peak ===
63°38′S 57°27′W. A conspicuous, flat-topped peak with talus-covered slopes, 560 metres (1,840 ft) high, standing at the northeast end of Eagle Island in Prince Gustav Channel. Discovered by the FIDS and so named following their 1945 survey. The name is descriptive of the slopes of the peak.

=== Aripleri Passage ===
63°38′10″S 57°35′30″W A 1.77 kilometres (1.10 mi) wide passage between Eagle Island and Yatrus Promontory. Named after the medieval fortress of Aripleri in Southeastern Bulgaria.

== Nearby islands ==
=== Tongue Rocks ===
63°38′S 57°21′W. A small ice-free volcanic rocks lying between Eagle Island and Beak Island, off Trinity Peninsula. Named by UK Antarctic Place-Names Committee (UK-APC) in association with Eagle and Beak Islands.

=== Beak Island ===
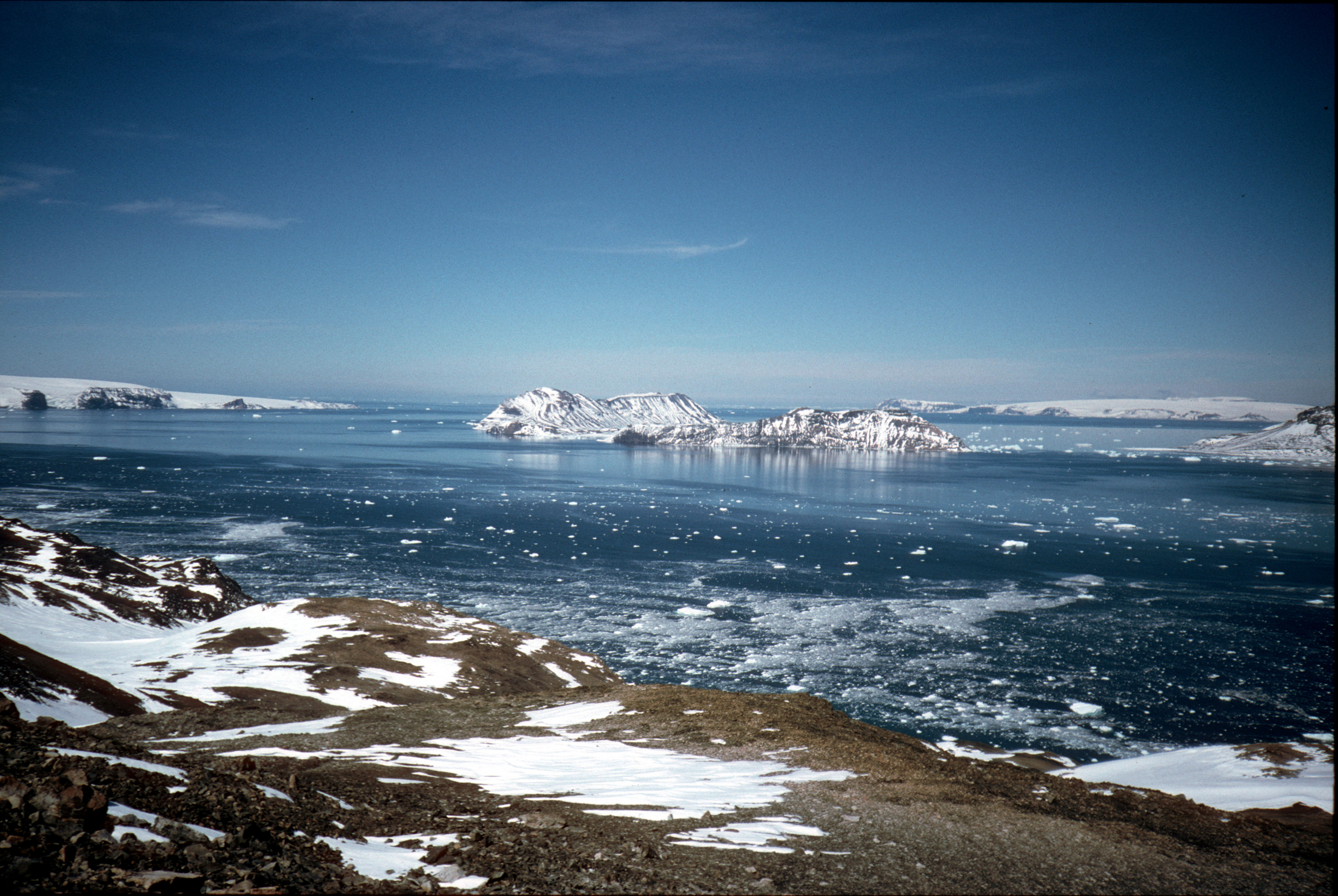
View of Beak Island from western summit of View Point

63°37′S 57°18′W. An arc-shaped island, 4 nautical miles (7.4 km; 4.6 mi) long and 360 metres (1,180 ft) high, lying 0.5 nautical miles (0.93 km; 0.58 mi) northeast of Eagle Island in the northeast part of Prince Gustav Channel. Probably first seen in 1902–03 by members of the SwedAE under Nordenskjold. The FIDS surveyed Beak Island in 1945 and so named it because of its shape and relative position to nearby Tail and Eagle Islands.

=== Tail Island ===
63°40′S 57°37′W. A circular island 1.25 nautical miles (2.32 km; 1.44 mi) in diameter and 130 metres (430 ft) high, lying midway between Egg Island and Eagle Island in the northeast part of Prince Gustav Channel. Islands in this area were first seen by a party under J. Gunnar Andersson of the SwedAE, 1901–04. Tail Island was charted by the FIDS in 1945, and so named by them because of its relative position to Eagle and Beak Islands.

=== Egg Island ===
63°41′S 57°42′W. A circular island 1.5 nautical miles (2.8 km; 1.7 mi) in diameter and 310 metres (1,020 ft) high, lying 1 nautical mile (1.9 km; 1.2 mi) west of Tail Island in the northeast part of Prince Gustav Channel. Probably first seen by a party under J. Gunnar Andersson of the SwedAE, 1901–04. It was charted in 1945 by the FIDS, who so named it because of its relative position to Tail, Eagle and Beak Islands.

=== Corry Island ===
63°43′S 57°31′W. An island 2 nautical miles (3.7 km; 2.3 mi) long and 510 metres (1,670 ft) high, lying off the south coast of Trinity Peninsula between Vega Island and Eagle Island. This is believed to be the feature sighted by a British expedition under James Clark Ross, 1839–43, and named Cape Corry for Thomas L. Corry, a Lord Commissioner of the Admiralty. In 1945, the FIDS charted an archipelago in this area. The present application of this name is in accord with the FIDS "that the name of Corry should be perpetuated on the most conspicuous of these islands as seen from eastward (the direction from which it was seen by Ross)".

=== Vortex Island ===
63°44'S, 57°38'W

An island 0.5 nautical miles (0.93 km; 0.58 mi) long and 245 metres (804 ft) high, lying in the northeast part of Prince Gustav Channel about 2 nautical miles (3.7 km; 2.3 mi) west-southwest of Corry Island. Islands in this area were first seen by a party under J. Gunnar Andersson of the SwedAE, 1901–04. Vortex Island was first charted by the FIDS in August 1945. The FIDS survey party was forced to lie idle there by a whirlwind snowstorm, thus suggesting the name.

=== Devil Island ===
63°48′S 57°17′W. A narrow island 1 nautical mile (1.9 km; 1.2 mi) long with a low summit on each end, lying in the center of a small bay 1 nautical mile (1.9 km; 1.2 mi) southeast of Cape Well-met, northern Vega Island. Discovered and named by the SwedAE, 1901–04, under Nordenskjold.

== Sources ==
- Alberts, Fred G., ed. (1995), Geographic Names of the Antarctic (PDF) (2 ed.), United States Board on Geographic Names This article incorporates public domain material from websites or documents of the United States Board on Geographic Names.
- "Aripleri Passage", Composite Gazetteer of Antarctica, Scientific Committee on Antarctic Research
- Graham Land and South Shetland Islands, BAS: British Antarctic Survey, 2005
- Kasha Patel (24 February 2020), Antarctica Melts Under Its Hottest Days on Record, NASA Earth Observatory
- Scottie, Andrew (24 February 2020), A heat wave in Antarctica melted 20% of an island's snow in 9 days, CNN
- Smellie, J.L.; Johnson, J.S.; Nelson, A.E. (2013), "Geological map of James Ross Island. I. James Ross Island Volcanic Group (1:125 000 scale)" (PDF), BAS GEOMAP 2 Series, Sheet 5, British Antarctic Survey

This article incorporates public domain material from websites or documents of the United States Geological Survey.
