= Humps Island =

Island in Antarctica

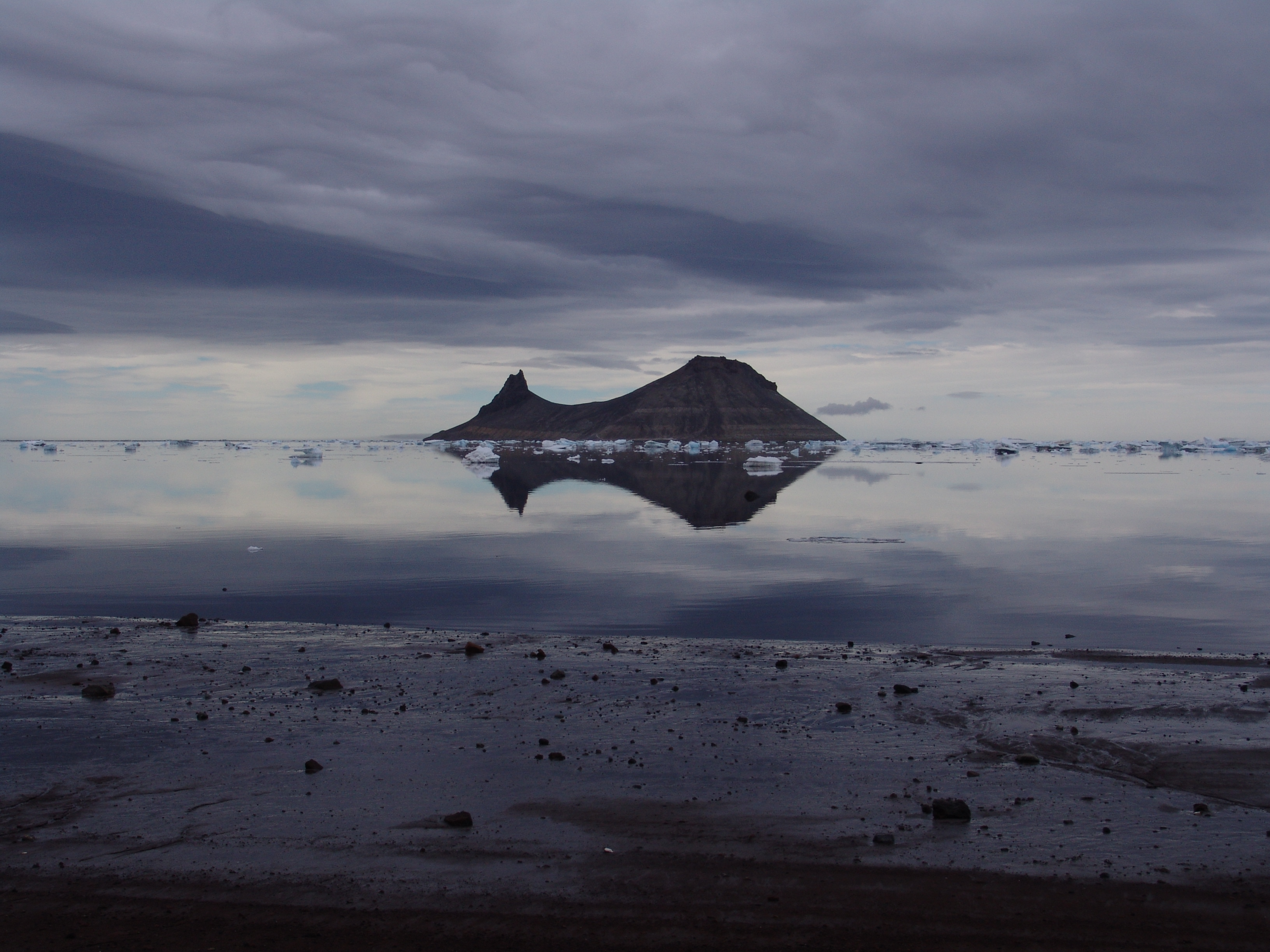
- Panoramic view of Humps Island as seen from the Naze Peninsula on James Ross Island.

- Location of Humps Island

- Location in Antarctica Humps Island (Antarctica)

Geography
- Location: Antarctica
- Coordinates: 63°59′S 57°25′W
- Archipelago: James Ross Island group
- Length: 1 km (0.6 mi)

Administration
- Administered under the Antarctic Treaty System

Humps Island is an island 0.5 nautical miles (1 km) long with two summits near the western end, situated 4 nautical miles (7 km) south-southeast of the tip of The Naze, a peninsula of northern James Ross Island, which lies south of the northeast end of the Antarctic Peninsula. It was discovered by the Swedish Antarctic Expedition under Nordenskjöld, 1901–04. This descriptive name was recommended by the UK Antarctic Place-Names Committee in 1948 following a survey of the area by the Falkland Islands Dependencies Survey in 1945.

== See also ==
- List of Antarctic and sub-Antarctic islands
