= Alban Dobson =

English cricketer and civil servant

Alban Dobson CVO CBE CB
Personal information
- Full name: Alban Tabor Austin Dobson
- Born: 29 June 1885; Ealing, Middlesex, England
- Died: 19 May 1962 (aged 76); Bury St Edmunds, Suffolk, England
- Batting: Unknown

Career statistics
Competition	First-class
Matches	1
Runs scored	1
Batting average	0.50
100s/50s	0/0
Top score	1
Catches/stumpings	0/–
- Source: Cricinfo, 2 August 2019

Alban Tabor Austin Dobson CVO CBE CB (29 June 1885 – 19 May 1962) was an English first-class cricketer and civil servant. Dobson was an important figure in the Board of Agriculture and Fisheries, later known as the Ministry of Agriculture and Fisheries. He later served as the secretary of the International Whaling Commission from 1949 to 1959 and the president of the International Council for the Exploration of the Sea from 1952 to 1955. As a cricketer, he made one first-class appearance for the Gentlemen of England.

== Early life and civil service career ==
The son of the poet Henry Austin Dobson, he was born at Ealing in June 1885 and was raised with a strict upbringing in the Plymouth Brethren. He was educated at Clifton College, before going up to Emmanuel College, Cambridge. While studying at Cambridge, he made a single appearance in first-class cricket for the Gentlemen of England against Surrey at The Oval in 1905. Batting twice in the match, he was dismissed in the Gentlemen of England first-innings without scoring by Jack Crawford, while in their second-innings he was dismissed for a single run by Ernest Nice. After graduating from Cambridge, he entered into the civil service. He was appointed to the position of assistant to the head of the Board of Agriculture and Fisheries in January 1908. Dobson served in the First World War with the Royal Hampshire Regiment, with him holding the rank of second lieutenant in November 1916, with promotion to the rank of lieutenant coming in April 1918.

== Post-war career and life ==
Following the war, he returned to the Ministry of Agriculture and Fisheries. He was made a CBE in the 1930 New Year Honours, before being made a Commander of the Royal Victorian Order in the 1932 New Year Honours. Seven years later he was made a Companion to the Order of the Bath in the 1939 New Year Honours. Following the death of his father, he managed his literary estate and kept a library of his father's works, which he donated to the Senate House Library at the University of London in 1946. Dobson was the secretary of the International Whaling Commission from 1949–59, before serving as the president of the International Council for the Exploration of the Sea from 1952–55. Dobson died at Bury St Edmunds in May 1962, and was survived by his son, the librarian Christopher Dobson. Two years after his death, the UK Antarctic Place-Names Committee named Dobson Dome after him.
