= Church Point =

Church Point may refer to:

- Church Point, Louisiana, United States
- Church Point, New South Wales, Australia
- Church Point, Nova Scotia, Canada
- Church Point, Virginia Beach, Virginia, United States
- Church Point, Antarctica
