= Beak Island =

Island in Graham Land, Antarctica

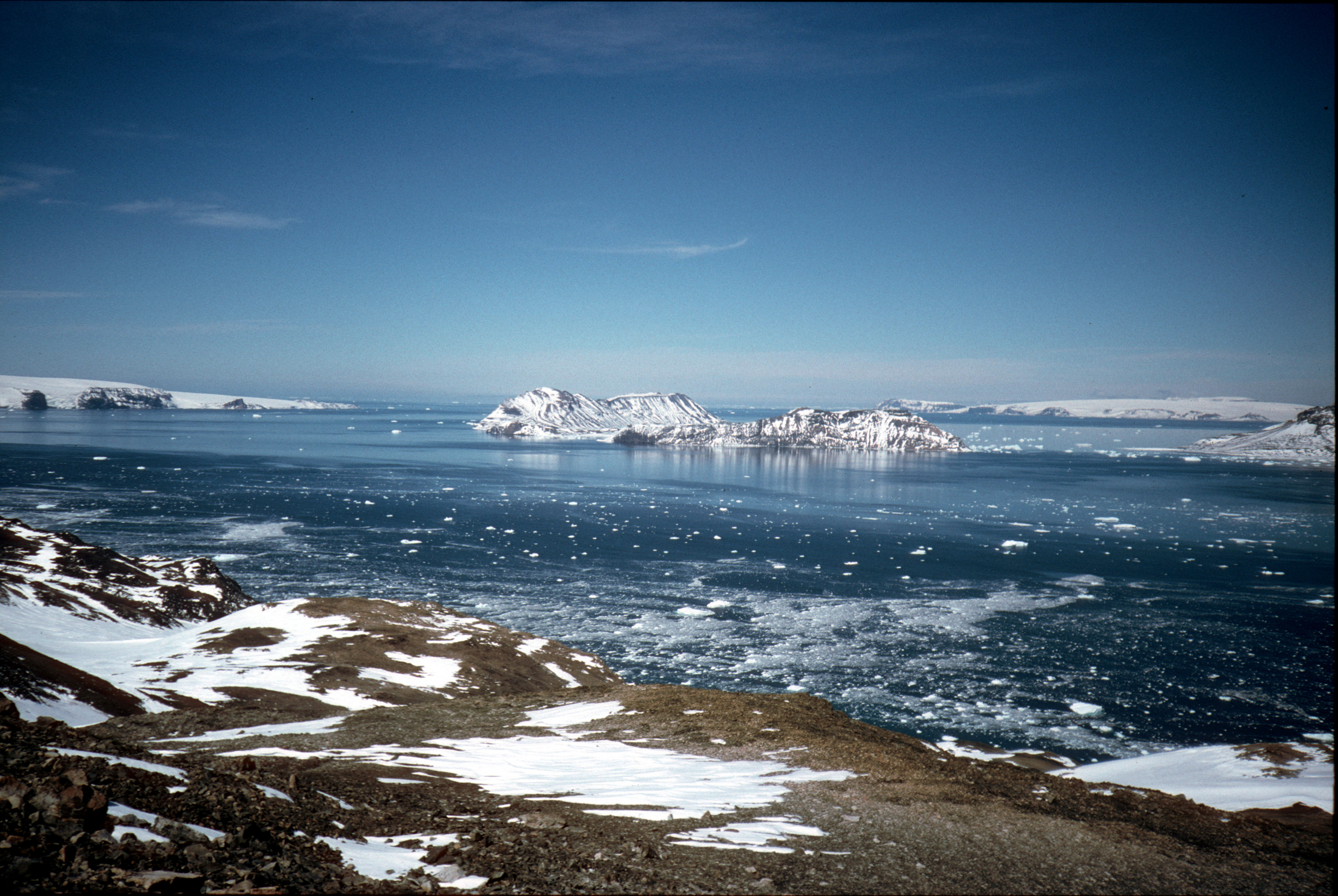
- View of Beak Island from western summit of View Point

- Location within Antarctica

Geography
- Location: Antarctica
- Coordinates: 63°37′S 57°18′W
- Highest elevation: 360 m (1180 ft)

Administration
- Administered under the Antarctic Treaty System

Demographics
- Population: Uninhabited

Beak Island is an arc-shaped island, 7 kilometres (4 nmi) long and 360 metres (1,200 ft) high, lying 1 kilometre (0.5 nmi) northeast of Eagle Island in the northeast part of Prince Gustav Channel, in Antarctica. It was possibly first seen in 1902–1903 by members of the Swedish Antarctic Expedition under Otto Nordenskiöld. The Falkland Islands Dependencies Survey surveyed Beak Island in 1945 and so named it because of its shape and relative position to nearby Tail Island and Eagle Island.

The island is volcanic in origin, having been K-Ar dated 1.7 ± 0.2 and 2.0 ± 0.2 million years old. It forms part of the James Ross Island Volcanic Group.

== See also ==
- List of Antarctic and sub-Antarctic islands
