= Abel Nunatak =

Highest point
- Coordinates: 63°33′S 57°41′W

Geography
- Location: Trinity Peninsula, Antarctica

Abel Nunatak is the easternmost of two isolated nunataks on the south side of Broad Valley, Trinity Peninsula. It is a volcanic feature and an inferred vent of the James Ross Island Volcanic Group.

The name arose at the time of the Falkland Islands Dependencies Survey (FIDS) geological survey in 1960–61 and is in association with nearby Cain Nunatak, after the biblical brothers Cain and Abel.
