= Devils Island =

Devils Island, Devil's Island, or Devil Island may refer to:

== Films ==
- Devil's Island (1926 film), silent starring Pauline Frederick and Marian Nixon
- Devil's Island (1939 film), starring Boris Karloff
- Devil's Island (1979 film), Yugoslav film
- Devil's Island (Jazeerat al-shaytan), a 1990 film by Egyptian director Nader Galal
- Devil's Island (1996 film), Icelandic film

== Music ==
- "Devil's Island", a song from the 1986 Megadeth album Peace Sells... but Who's Buying?
- "Devil's Island", a 2011 single, included on the 2012 album Daybreaker by British band Architects

== Places ==
=== Antarctica ===
- Devil Island

=== Canada ===
- Devil Island (Lake Temagami), Ontario
- Devils Island (Nova Scotia)
- Devil's Island, former name for King Island (Saskatchewan)

=== French Guiana ===
- Devil's Island, former penal colony
- Devil's Island (Kourou), island of the Salvation's Islands

=== Greenland ===
- Djævleøen (Devil's Island)

=== United States ===
- Devils Island (Wisconsin), one of the Apostle Islands

== See also ==
- Alcatraz - Uncle Sam's Devil's Island by Philip Grosser
- Isle of Devils or Devil's Isles, old names for Bermuda
- King of Devil's Island, a 2010 film about Norway's Bastøy Prison
