= Erebus and Terror Gulf =

Gulf in the Antarctic Peninsula

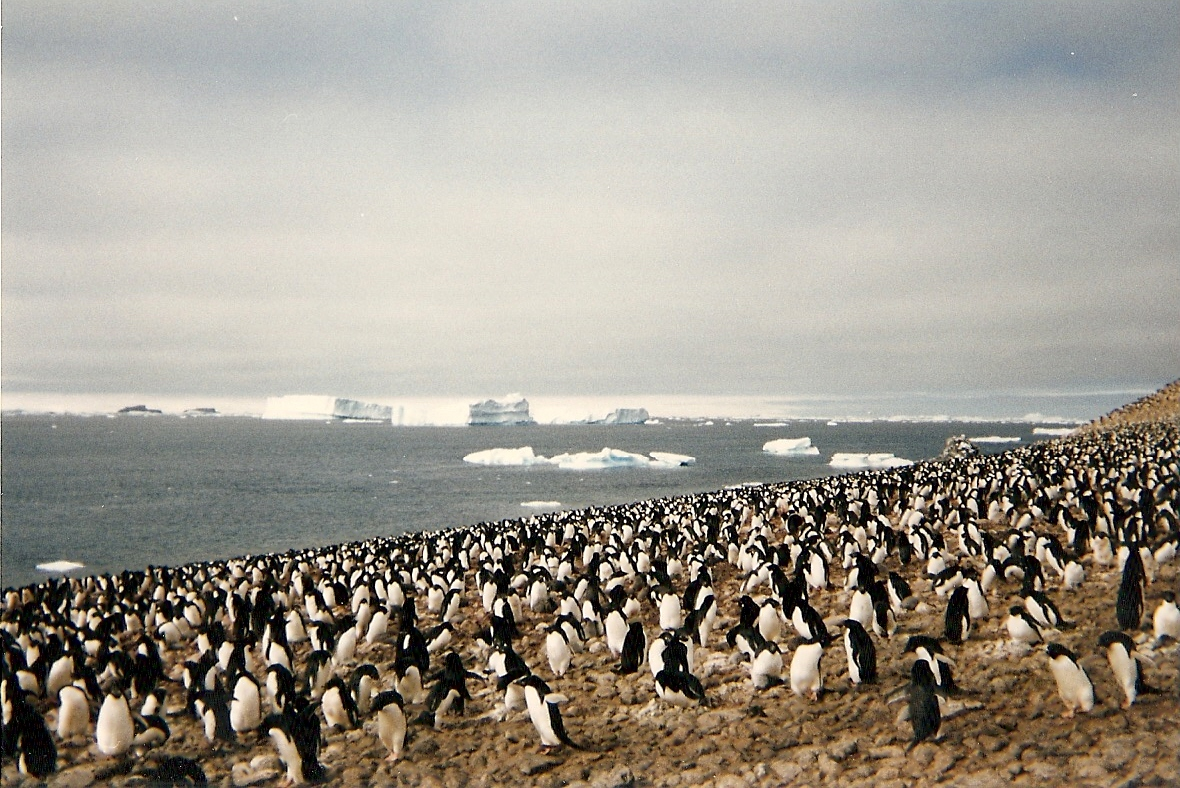
- Adélie penguin rookery at Erebus and Terror Gulf on Paulet Island, 1996

- Location within Antarctica
- Coordinates: 63°55′S 56°40′W
- Type: Gulf
- Ocean/sea sources: Weddell Sea

The Erebus and Terror Gulf (63°55′S 56°40′W) is a gulf on the southeast side of the tip of the Antarctic Peninsula, bordered on the northeast by the Joinville Island group and on the southwest by the James Ross Island group.

== Location ==
Trinity Peninsula on Antarctic Peninsula. Erebus and Terror Gulf to the northeast

The Erebus and Terror Gulf lies in Graham Land to the east of the Trinity Peninsula, which is itself the tip of the Antarctic Peninsula. The Joinville Island group, Andersson Island and the Tabarin Peninsula are to the north. Prince Gustav Channel enters the west of the gulf, between Eagle Island to the north and Vega Island to the south. James Ross Island and Seymour Island form the southwest edge of the gulf. The Weddell Sea is to the east.

This region contains tabular icebergs.

== Name ==
The Erebus and Terror Gulf was named for HMS Erebus and HMS Terror, the vessels used by Sir James Clark Ross in exploring these waters in 1842–43.

== Features ==
=== Barker Bank ===
64°01′S 57°01′W. A marine bank in Erebus and Terror Gulf with a least depth of 20 metres (66 ft). The bank extends northeast from Ula Point, James Ross Island, but its limits are not precisely defined. Charted from HMS Endurance, 1981–1982, and named by the UK Antarctic Place-Names Committee (UK-APC) after Captain Nicholas J. Barker, RN, who was in command of the ship, 1980–1982.

== Sources ==
- Alberts, Fred G., ed. (1995), Geographic Names of the Antarctic (PDF) (2 ed.), United States Board on Geographic Names This article incorporates public domain material from websites or documents of the United States Board on Geographic Names.
- Graham Land and South Shetland Islands, BAS: British Antarctic Survey, 2005

This article incorporates public domain material from websites or documents of the United States Geological Survey.
