= Cape Purvis =

Cape Purvis (63°35′S 55°58′W) is a cape forming the south extremity of Dundee Island, off the north tip of Antarctic Peninsula. Its topography is that of a promontory which forms a mesa. The rest of the island is smooth.

== Composition ==
The only large, accessible portion of Cape Purvis is at its southwest. It is composed of recently formed volcanic rock of the James Ross Island Volcanic Group. Cape Purvis is described as a basalt tuya in the Encyclopedia of Quaternary Science.

The basalts on Cape Purvis have similar composition to lavas on Paulet Island, which is 5 kilometers east of it. Said composition is relatively low in magnesium oxide but high in titanium dioxide, calcium oxide, and niobium.

Cape Purvis's snow and ice-covered summit boasts an unnamed hill at its northern edge.

== Discovery ==
It was discovered in December 1842 by Captain James Ross, Royal Navy, and named by him for Commodore (later Rear Admiral) John B. Purvis, Royal Navy, who was of assistance to Ross's expedition. Of all islands in the James Ross Island Volcanic Group, it is the furthest north. It is also one of the youngest.
