= George Harris (cricketer, born 1880) =

English cricketer

Personal information
- Full name: George Woodrouffe Harris
- Born: 6 August 1880; Chelsea, London, England
- Died: 10 July 1954 (aged 73); Chorleywood, Hertfordshire, England
- Batting: Right-handed

Domestic team information
- Years: Team
- 1899: Hampshire

Career statistics
Competition	First-class
Matches	1
Runs scored	10
Batting average	5.00
100s/50s	–/–
Top score	10
Catches/stumpings	–/–
- Source: Cricinfo, 29 December 2009

George Woodrouffe Harris (6 August 1880 – 10 July 1954) was an English first-class cricketer.

The son of Vincent Dormer Harris, he was born at Chelsea in August 1880. He was educated at Uppingham School, before matriculating to Caius College, Cambridge. In his final year at Uppingham, Harris made a single appearance in first-class cricket for Hampshire against Surrey at The Oval in the 1899 County Championship. Batting twice in the match, he was dismissed in Hampshire's first innings for 10 runs by Ernest Nice, while in their second innings he was dismissed without scoring by Tom Hayward. After graduating from Cambridge, Harris was in business as a merchant at Bishopsgate. In 1924, he was elected a fellow of the Zoological Society of London, in addition to being a member of the Linnean Society of London. Harris died at Chorleywood in July 1954.
