= Vortex Island =

Island in Graham Land, Antarctica

Vortex Island (63°44′S 57°38′W) is an island 0.5 nautical miles (0.9 km) long and 245 m high, lying in the northeast part of Prince Gustav Channel about 2 nautical miles (3.7 km) west-southwest of Corry Island, close south of Trinity Peninsula. Islands in this area were first seen by a party under J. Gunnar Andersson of the Swedish Antarctic Expedition, 1901–04. Vortex Island was first charted by the Falkland Islands Dependencies Survey (FIDS) in August 1945. The FIDS survey party was forced to lie idle there by a whirlwind snowstorm, thus suggesting the name.

== Geology ==
Vortex Island is composed of Pleistocene volcanic rocks of the James Ross Island Volcanic Group, consisting of a tuya or moberg, which is a volcano erupted under an icecap. Yellow layers are palagonite weathering of steeply dipping ash layers, whereas black layers are basalt flows and pillow basalts.

== See also ==
- List of Antarctic and sub-Antarctic islands
