= Cone Nunatak =

Nunatak in Graham Land, Antarctica

Cone Nunatak (63°36′S 57°2′W) is a nunatak, 350 metres (1,150 ft) high, which appears conical on its north side but has brown rock cliffs on its south face, lying 3 nautical miles (6 km) south-southeast of Buttress Hill on the Tabarin Peninsula, at the northeast extremity of the Antarctic Peninsula. It represents a volcanic vent of the James Ross Island Volcanic Group.

The descriptive name was applied by the Falkland Islands Dependencies Survey following their survey of the area in 1946.
