= Cain Nunatak =

Nunatak in Graham Land, Antarctica

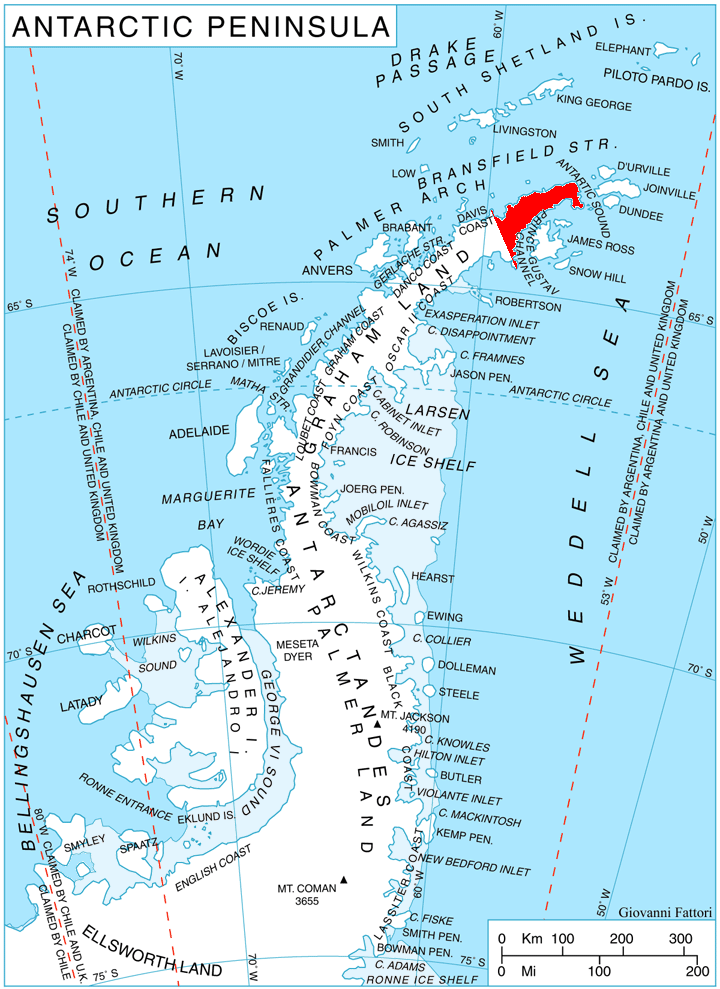
Location of Trinity Peninsula.

Cain Nunatak (63°34′S 57°42′W) is the westernmost of two isolated nunataks on the south side of Broad Valley, situated 3.37 km east-northeast of Kumata Hill on Trinity Peninsula, Antarctica. It is a volcanic feature and an inferred vent of the James Ross Island Volcanic Group.

The name arose at the time of the Falkland Islands Dependencies Survey geological survey in 1960–61 and is in association with nearby Abel Nunatak, through the story of Cain and Abel.

== Map ==
- Trinity Peninsula. Scale 1:250000 topographic map No. 5697. Institut für Angewandte Geodäsie and British Antarctic Survey, 1996.
