= Brown Bluff =

Volcano located in Antarctica

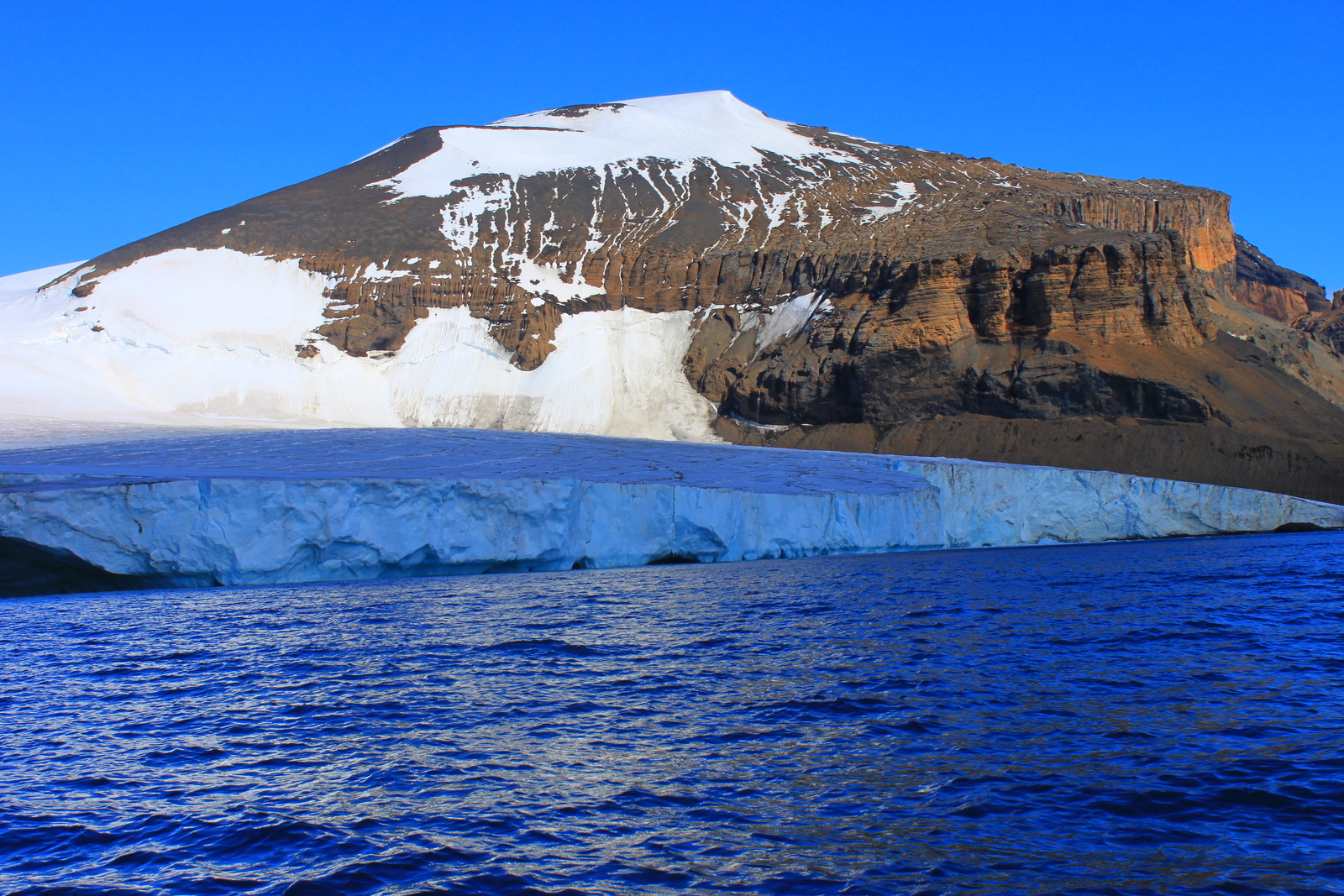
- Brown Bluff as seen from Antarctic Sound

Highest point
- Elevation: 745 m (2,444 ft)
- Listing: List of subglacial volcanoes List of volcanoes in Antarctica
- Coordinates: 63°32′S 56°55′W

Geography
- Location within Antarctica
- Location: Tabarin Peninsula, Antarctica

Geology
- Mountain type: Tuya
- Volcanic field: James Ross Island Volcanic Group
- Last eruption: Pleistocene

Brown Bluff is a basalt tuya on the Tabarin Peninsula of northern Antarctica. It formed in the last 1 million years as a result of subglacial eruptions within an englacial lake. The volcano's original diameter is thought to have been about 12–15 kilometers (7.5–9.3 mi) and was probably formed by a single vent. Brown Bluff is divided into four stages: pillow volcano, tuff cone, slope failure, and hyaloclastite delta; and into five structural units.

The volcano gets its name from its steep slopes and brown-to-black hyaloclastite. It was applied by the Falkland Islands Dependencies Survey following their survey in 1946.

== Environment ==
=== Topography ===
Brown Bluff has a 1.5 km-long (0.93 mi) cobble and ash beach rising increasingly steeply towards towering red-brown tuff cliffs embedded with bombs and tephra. The cliffs are heavily eroded, resulting in loose scree and rock falls on higher slopes, and large, wind-eroded boulders on the beach. Permanent ice and tidewater glaciers surround the site to the north and south, occasionally filling the beach with brash ice.

=== Flora and fauna ===
Lichens in the genera Xanthoria and Caloplaca have been recorded on exposed boulders from the shoreline to an elevation of 185 m (607 ft). Mosses occur at higher elevations near glacial drainage.

The site has been identified as an Important Bird Area (IBA) by BirdLife International because it supports a breeding colony of about 20,000 pairs of Adélie penguins, as well as about 550 pairs of gentoo penguins. Other birds nesting there include cape petrels, Wilson's storm petrels and kelp gulls. Weddell seals regularly haul out, and leopard seals often hunt offshore.

== Geology ==
Brown Bluff is a one-half-mile-high (0.80 km) cliff of volcanic rocks consisting of a tuya or moberg, which is a volcano erupted under an icecap. The base layer is breccia formed by violent phreatic eruptions under the lake formed in the ice cap by the magmatic heat. The middle yellow layers are palagonite weathering of steeply dipping ash layers. The top caprock is composed of black layers are basalt flows that erupted after the meltwater lake drained away, resulting in subaerial lava flows.
