= Vega Island =

Island of Antarctica

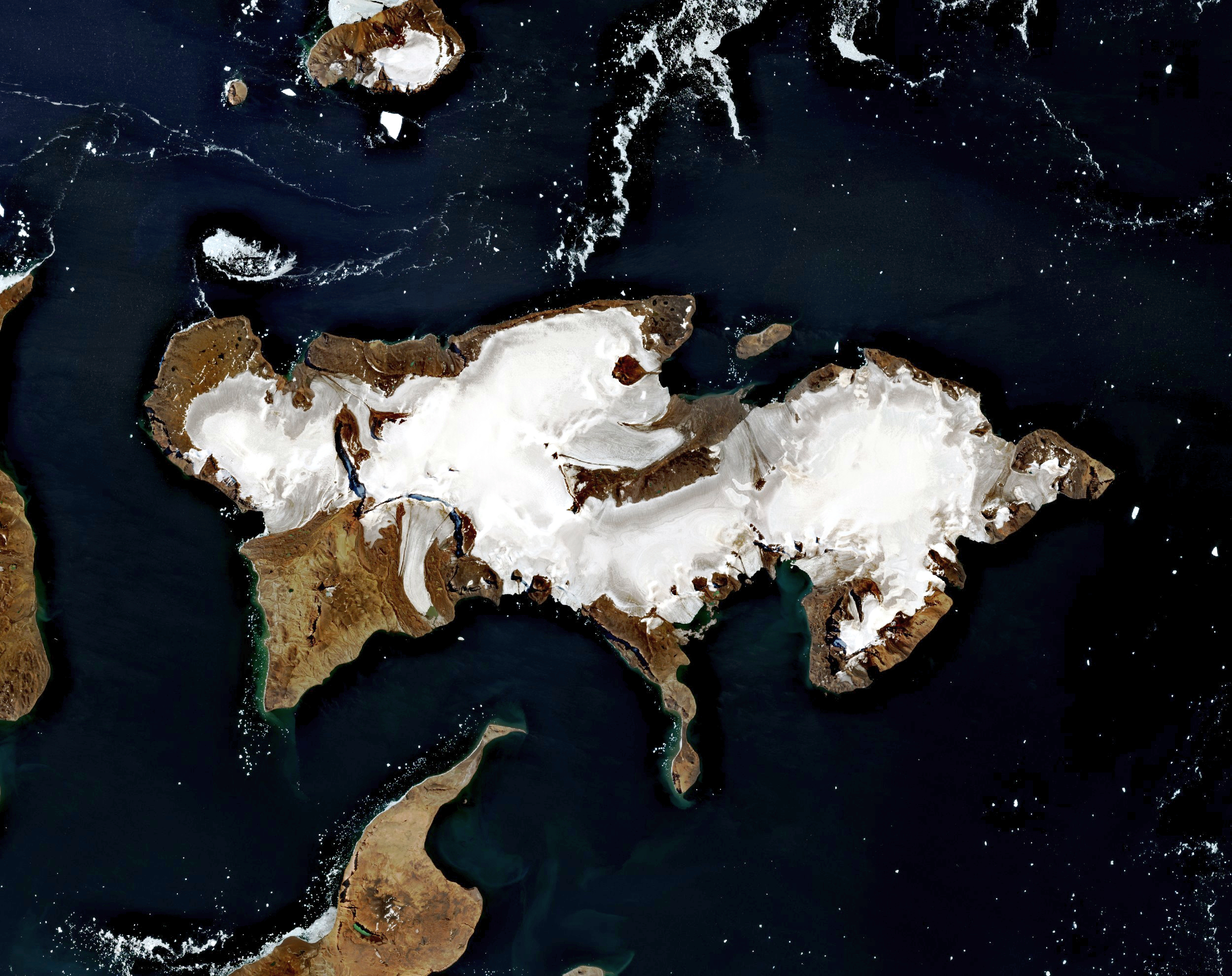
- Satellite image of Vega Island

- Location of Vega Island

- Location in Antarctica

Geography
- Location: Graham Land, Antarctica
- Coordinates: 63°50′S 57°25′W
- Archipelago: James Ross Island group
- Width: 3 km (1.9 mi)

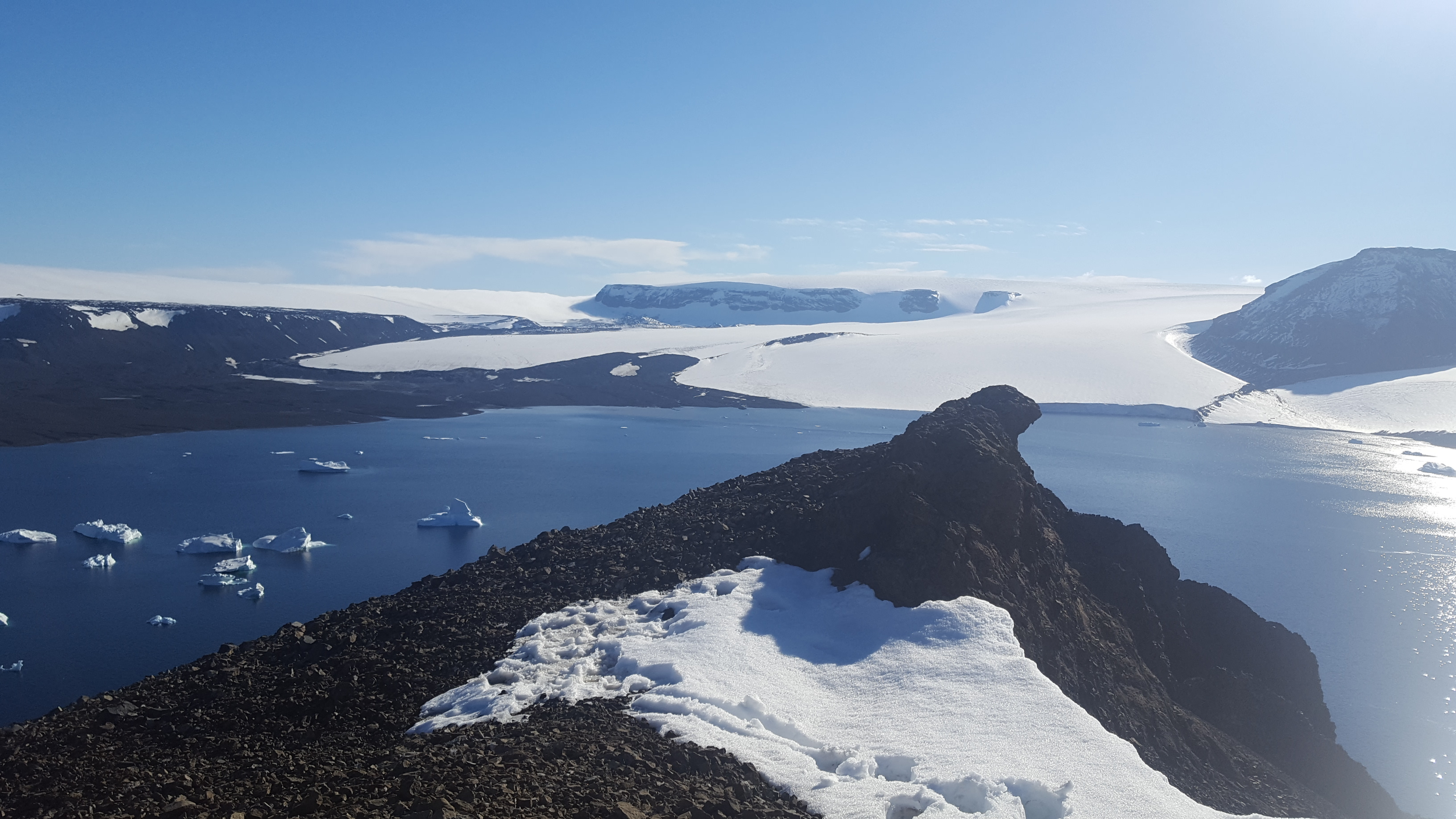
Mountaintop view of Vega Island

Vega Island (63°50′S 57°25′W) is an island in Antarctica, 17 nautical miles (31 km; 20 mi) long and 6 nautical miles (11 km; 6.9 mi) wide, which is the northernmost of the James Ross Island group and lies in the west part of Erebus and Terror Gulf. It is separated from James Ross Island by Herbert Sound and from Trinity Peninsula by Prince Gustav Channel.

== Location ==
Vega Island is in Graham Land, to the southeast of the Trinity Peninsula, which is the tip of the Antarctic Peninsula. Erebus and Terror Gulf is to the east. James Ross Island is to the south, and the Ulu Peninsula of James Ross Island is to the west, separated from Vega Island by the Herbert Sound. The Prince Gustav Channel separates it from Corry Island and Eagle Island to the north. Cape Gordon is at the east end of the island.

== Sailing directions ==
The US Defense Mapping Agency's Sailing Directions for Antarctica (1976) describes Vega Island as follows:

Vega Island, the northernmost of the Ross Group, is about 16 miles long, east and west, and 5 miles wide, It is high and precipitous, with tower like rocks; the lower fells of eruptive rock are plateau like in form, and brown in color. Cape Scott Keltie (Keltie Head) and Cape Gordon, the western and eastern extremities, respectively, are high projecting headlands. On the northern coast, near the middle of the island, is Cape Wellmet, a dark, conspicuous, jutting headland.

Devil Island, 680 feet high, lies close to the northern shore in the vicinity of Cape Wellmet. It has steep stone sides and is ice-free. Cape Gordon is believed to be clear of dangers: the Wyatt Earp passed the high cliffs less than 100 yards distant. On the southern coast near the middle of the island a headland, known as False Island Point, extends for about 2 1/4 miles to the southward. A rock lies about 1/2 mile offshore in a position about 4 miles east-northeastward of False Island Point; some charts show this rock as lying on a shoal area extending up to 3/4 mile from a point on the shore. A shoal, with a depth of 0.9m (3 ft.) lies about 6 3/4 miles eastward of Cape Gordon.

== Name ==
Vega Island was named by Dr. Otto Nordenskjöld, leader of the Swedish Antarctic Expedition (SwedAE; 1901–04), apparently for the ship Vega used by his uncle, Baron A.E. Nordenskjold, in making the first voyage through the Northeast Passage between 1878 and 1879.

== Geology ==
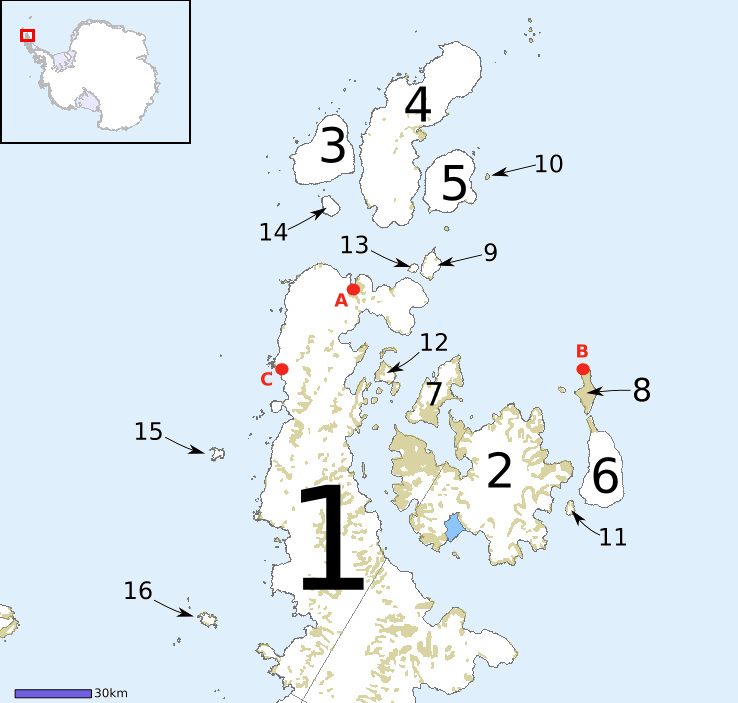
Antarctica Peninsula island: Vega Island (7)

Vega Island is a volcanic island of the James Ross Island Volcanic Group. As can be observed in limited outcrops, Vega Island consists of the deeply eroded volcanic deposits of tuff cones and lava-fed, volcanic deltas. So far, these volcanic deposits have been dated at being 2, 2.67, and 5.42 Ma. They rest upon well-bedded sandstones and mudstones ranging in age from Cretaceous to Paleogene periods. These sedimentary strata outcrop near the islands's base and as bluffs along its shoreline.

The lava-fed, volcanic deltas formed by the eruption of lava from a volcanic vent into a glacial lake formed by the prior melting of the ice cap in which the lake was contained. Initially, the underwater eruption resulted in volcanic breccia and basaltic pillow lava. As the volcanic deposits built up, the volcanic vent rose above lake level and erupted subaerially forming tuff cones and lava-feed, volcanic deltas that built out into the glacial lake. The basaltic lava flows form a caprock along the northwest shore, which forms an impermeable layer that results in about sixty waterfalls on warm days.

In Vegas Island, the Cretaceous sedimentary strata outcrops primarily in Cape Lamb and False Island Point. The oldest Cretaceous strata consists of minor outcrops of highly bioturbated silty mudstones to silty sandstones of the Herbert Sound Member of the Santa Marta Formation. Widely exposed and overlying it are 400 m (1,300 ft) of fine-grained strata in Lamb Member of the Snow Hill Island Formation. The youngest exposed Cretaceous strata in Vegas Island belong to the Sandwich Bluff Member of the López de Bertodano Formation. This member consists of 111 m (364 ft) of a variety of sedimentary rock types, including thin conglomerates, pebbly sandstones, sandstones and mudstones, and contains slump sheets, hummocky cross-stratification and rare rootlet horizons. The Sandwich Bluff Member is exposed almost entirely along the flanks of Sandwich Bluff in an outcrop that is approximately 700 m (2,300 ft) long by 300 m (980 ft) wide.

== Paleontology ==
The exposed Cretaceous strata make Vega Island is an important site for paleontology. The Cape Lamb Member of the Snow Hill Island Formation contains an extraordinarily abundant and diverse marine invertebrate macrofauna. This macrofauna is dominated by ammonoids (mostly Gunnarites antarcticus), nautiloids, bivalves (mostly Pinna sp.), crustaceans, and serpulid worms. Fossil wood is also abundant in these strata along with a large variety of trace fossils preserved within concretions. the fossil bones of dinosaurs Hadrosauridae and birds (Charadriiformes) have been found in the Cape Lamb Member in 1986. The López de Bertodano Formation exposed at Sandwich Bluff is also an important locality for its fossils of high-latitude, latest Cretaceous terrestrial plants and vertebrates in the Southern Hemisphere. Vertebrate fossils found there include the fossils of mosasaurs, plesiosaurs (Mauisaurus sp.), dinosaurs (Hadrosauridae), and birds (Polarornis sp. and Vegavis iaai).

== Northern features ==
Northern features, from west to east, include:

=== Keltie Head ===
63°47′S 57°41′W. A rounded headland with vertical cliffs which rise to a small ice dome 395 metres (1,296 ft) high, forming the northwest end of Vega Island. Discovered by the SwedAE under Otto Nordenskjöld, 1901-04, and named by him for Sir John Scott Keltie, Secretary of the Royal Geographical Society, 1892-1915.

=== Sandwich Bluff ===
63°50′S 57°30′W. A flat-topped mountain, 610 metres (2,000 ft) high, broken sharply at its west side by a steep dark bluff standing slightly west of center on Vega Island. Discovered by the SwedAE under Otto Nordenskjöld, 1901-04. Charted in 1945 by the FIDS, and so named because a horizontal snow-holding band of rock breaks the western cliff giving it the appearance of a sandwich when viewed from the north.

=== Vertigo Cliffs ===
63°48′S 57°26′W. Spectacular, near vertical cliffs on the north coast of Vega Island. The cliffs rise to about 200 metres (660 ft) high and extend west for 7 nautical miles (13 km; 8.1 mi) from Cape Well-met, broken by a cirque near the west end. Named allusively by the UK Antarctic Place-Names Committee (UK-APC) in 1987.

=== Cape Well-met ===
63°47′S 57°19′W. A dark, conspicuous headland near the center of the north side of Vega Island, close south of Trinity Peninsula. Cape Well-met was discovered and named by the SwedAE, 1901-04- The name commemorates the long delayed union at this point of a relief party under Doctor Johan Gunnar Andersson and the winter party under Doctor Otto Nordenskjöld after twenty months of enforced separation.

=== Cape Gordon ===
63°51′S 57°03′W. A jagged headland 330 metres (1,080 ft) high, forming the east end of Vega Island. Discovered by a British expedition 1839-43, under James Clark Ross, and named by him for Captain William Gordon, RN, a Lord Commissioner of the Admiralty

== Southern features ==
Southern features, from west to east, include:

=== Cape Lamb ===
63°54′S 57°37′W. A cape which forms the southwest tip of Vega Island. It was discovered by the SwedAE, 1901-04, under Otto Nordenskjöld. It was resighted in 1945 by the Falkland Islands Dependencies Survey (FIDS), and named after Ivan Mackenzie Lamb (1911-90), botanist on the FIDS staff at Port Lockroy, 1944; at Hope Bay, 1945; leader of biological expedition to Melchior Islands, 1964-65.

=== Léal Bluff ===
63°53′S 57°35′W. A rounded bluff rising to 485 metres (1,591 ft) high, 2 nautical miles (3.7 km; 2.3 mi) inland from Cape Lamb in the southwest part of Vega Island. It was named by the Argentine Antarctic Expedition after Mayor Jorge Leal, deputy leader at the Argentine Esperanza Base in 1947.

=== False Island Point ===
63°55′S 57°20′W. A headland 1 nautical mile (1.9 km; 1.2 mi) long and 0.5 nautical miles (0.93 km; 0.58 mi) wide, which is connected by a low, narrow, almost invisible isthmus to the south side of Vega Island. First sighted in February 1902 and charted as an island by the SwedAE under Otto Nordenskjöld. It was determined to be a part of Vega Island in 1945 by the Falkland Islands Dependencies Survey (FIDS), who applied this descriptive name.

=== Pastorizo Bay ===
63°54′S 57°17′W. A bay 2 nautical miles (3.7 km; 2.3 mi) wide, indenting the south side of Vega Island just west of Mahogany Bluff. The name appears on an Argentine chart of 1959.

=== Mahogany Bluff ===
Mahogany Bluff from Pastorizo Bay. The sea is in the process of freezing, forming grease ice.

63°53′S 57°14′W. A rocky bluff 5 nautical miles (9.3 km; 5.8 mi) southwest of Cape Gordon, forming the east side of Pastorizo Bay. So named by UK-APC because of the striking deep red-brown color of the bluff.

== Sources ==
- Alberts, Fred G., ed. (1995), Geographic Names of the Antarctic (PDF) (2 ed.), United States Board on Geographic Names This article incorporates public domain material from websites or documents of the United States Board on Geographic Names.
- Graham Land and South Shetland Islands, BAS: British Antarctic Survey, 2005
- Hart, M.B.; Batenburg, S.J.; Huber, B.T.; Price, G.D.; Thibault, N.; Wagreich, M.; Walaszczyk, I. (2025). "Cretaceous stratigraphy of Antarctica and its global significance.". Cretaceous Project 200 Volume 2: Regional Studies. London, England: Geological Society. doi:10.1144/SP545-2023-153. ISBN 978-1-78620-610-7.
- Roberts, E.M.; Lamanna, M.C.; Clarke, J.A.; Meng, J.; Gorscak, E.; Sertich, J.J.; O'Connor, P.M.; Claeson, K.M.; MacPhee, R.D. (2014). "Stratigraphy and vertebrate paleoecology of Upper Cretaceous–? lowest Paleogene strata on Vega Island, Antarctica". Palaeogeography, Palaeoclimatology, Palaeoecology. 402 (2014): 55–72. Bibcode:2014PPP...402...55R. doi:10.1016/j.palaeo.2014.03.005.
- Sailing Directions for Antarctica: Includes Islands South of Latitude 60.̊, United States. Defense Mapping Agency. Hydrographic Center, 1976
- Salani, Flavia M (January 2005), Rocas hipabisales del grupo volcánico James Ross, Isla Vega] (PDF) (in Spanish), National Scientific and Technical Research Council, Argentine Antarctic Institute, archived from the original (PDF) on 12 June 2007
- Smellie, J.L.; Johnson, J.S.; Nelson, A.E. (2013), "Geological map of James Ross Island. I. James Ross Island Volcanic Group (1:125 000 scale)" (PDF), BAS GEOMAP 2 Series, Sheet 5 -, British Antarctic Survey
- Smellie, J.L.; Johnson, J.S.; McIntosh, W.C.; Esser, R.; Gudmundsson, M.T.; Hambrey, M.J.; De Vries, B.V.W. (2008), "Six million years of glacial history recorded in volcanic lithofacies of the James Ross Island Volcanic Group, Antarctic Peninsula", Palaeogeography, Palaeoclimatology, Palaeoecology, 260 (1–2): 122–148, doi:10.1016/j.palaeo.2007.08.011

This article incorporates public domain material from websites or documents of the United States Geological Survey.
