= Dobson Dome =

Mountain in Antarctica

Dobson Dome (64°2′S 57°55′W) is a prominent snow-covered, dome-shaped mountain 950 metres (3,120 ft) high between Rohss Bay and Croft Bay, in the northern portion of James Ross Island. It was surveyed by the Falkland Islands Dependencies Survey of 1958–61, and it was named by the UK Antarctic Place-Names Committee for Alban Dobson (1885–1962), a British civil servant who was Secretary of the International Whaling Commission from 1949–59 and President of the International Council for the Exploration of the Sea from 1952–55.

Dobson Dome is described as a basalt tuya in the Encyclopedia of Quaternary Science. It is part of the James Ross Island Volcanic Group.
