= Seacatch Nunataks =

Nunatak group in Graham Land, Antarctica

Seacatch Nunataks (63°58′S 58°4′W) is a group of nunataks rising to about 500 m between Carro Pass and Massey Heights in James Ross Island. It was named by the United Kingdom Antarctic Place-Names Committee (UK-APC) following British Antarctic Survey (BAS) geological work here from 1981-83 and is named after Seacatch, the father seal in Kipling's The White Seal, in association with similar names in this area.
