= James Ross Island group =

Group of islands off Graham Land in Antarctica

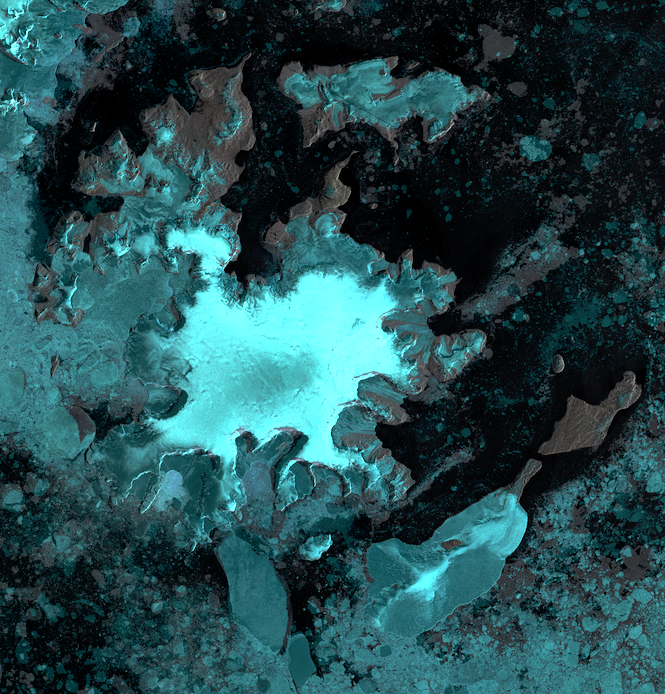
- Satellite image of James Ross Island group

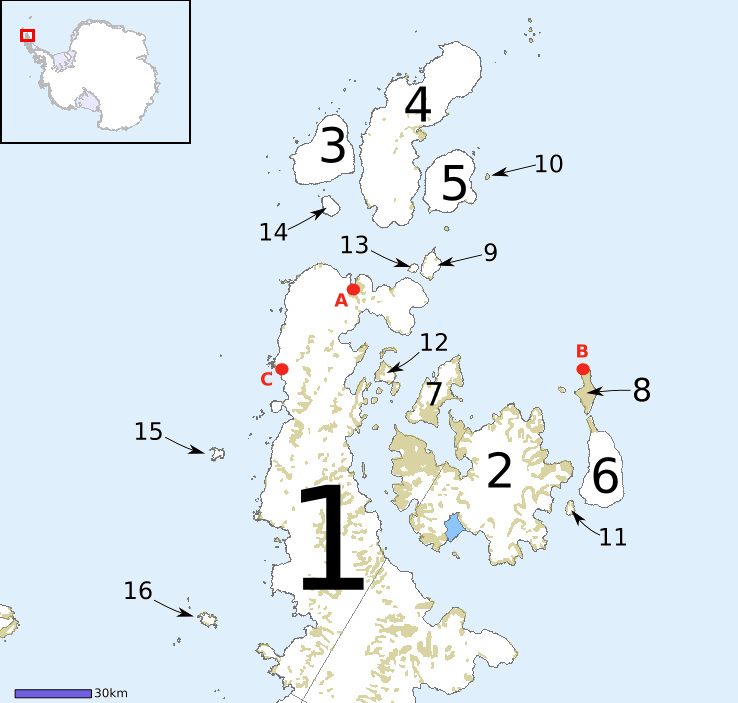
- Map of Graham Land, showing James Ross Island (2), Snow Hill Island (6), Vega Island (7), Seymour Island (8), and Lockyer Island (11)

- Location within Antarctica

Geography
- Location: Antarctica
- Coordinates: 64°10′S 57°45′W

Administration
- Administered under the Antarctic Treaty System

The James Ross Island group (64°10′S 57°45′W) is a group of islands located close to the northeastern tip of the Antarctic Peninsula. The largest islands in the group are James Ross Island, Snow Hill Island, Vega Island, and Seymour Island. The islands lie to the south of the Joinville Island group. The groups contains several scientific bases, notably Marambio Base, and numerous important palaeontological sites.

== Location ==
Trinity Peninsula on Antarctic Peninsula. James Ross Island group to the left

The James Ross Island group lies in Graham Land to the east of the tip of Trinity Peninsula, which is itself the tip of the Antarctic Peninsula. It is separated from the mainland by Prince Gustav Channel, to the west. Eagle Island is to the north of this channel. The Erebus and Terror Gulf is to the northeast. The Weddell Sea is to the south and east. The main islands are James Ross Island, separated from Vega Island to the north by Herbert Sound, Seymour Island, Snow Hill Island and Lockyer Island.

== Features ==
=== Herbert Sound ===
63°55′S 57°40′W. A sound extending from Cape Lachman and Keltie Head on the northwest to the narrows between The Naze and False Island Point on the southeast, separating Vega Island from James Ross Island and connecting Prince Gustav Channel with Erebus and Terror Gulf. On 6 January 1843 Captain James Clark Ross discovered a broad embayment east of the sound, which he named Sidney Herbert Bay after the Hon. Sidney Herbert, M.P., First Secretary to the Admiralty, 1841–45. The sound proper was discovered and charted by the Swedish Antarctic Expedition (SwedAE), 1901–04, under Otto Nordenskjöld, who included it with the broad embayment under the name Sidney Herbert Sound. The recommended application restricts Herbert Sound to the area west of the narrows between The Naze and False Island Point; the embayment discovered by Ross forms the west margin of Erebus and Terror Gulf.

=== Admiralty Sound ===
64°20′S 57°10′W. A sound which extends in a northeast–southwest direction and separates Seymour Island and Snow Hill Island from James Ross Island. The broad northeast part of the sound was named Admiralty Inlet by the British expedition under James Clark Ross, who discovered it on 6 January 1843. The feature was determined to be a sound rather than a bay in 1902 by the SwedAE under Otto Nordenskjöld.

=== Picnic Passage ===
64°20′S 56°55′W. A marine channel, 1.5 nautical miles (2.8 km; 1.7 mi) long and 0.5 nautical miles (0.93 km; 0.58 mi) wide, between Snow Hill Island and Seymour Island. First surveyed in 1902 by SwedAE, 1901–04, under Otto Nordenskjöld. The UK-APC name arose from the excellent sledging conditions experienced during the Falkland Islands Dependencies Survey (FIDS) resurveying of the area of 1952, which gave to the work a picnic-like atmosphere.

=== Lockyer Island ===
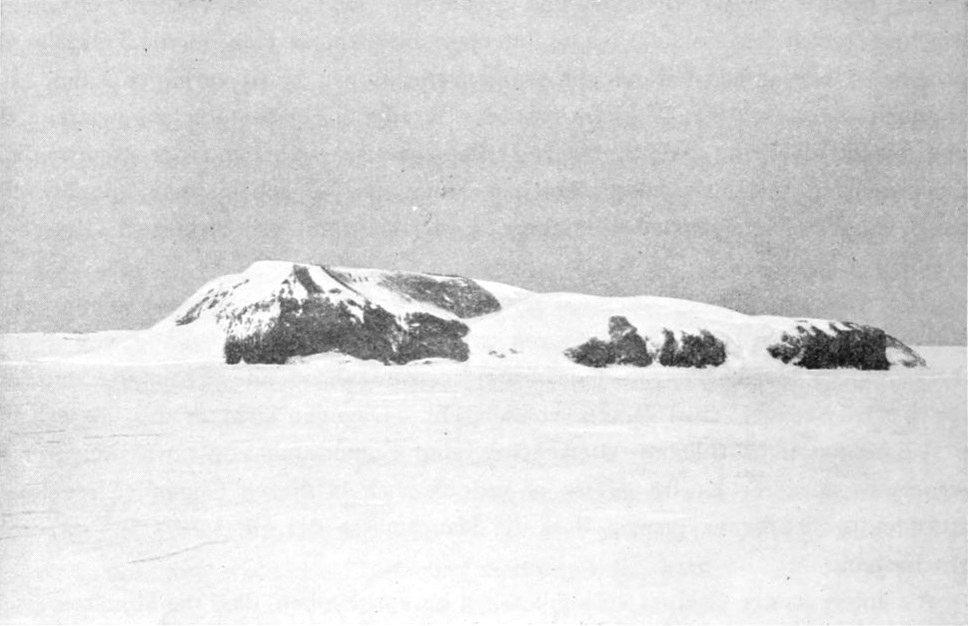
Lockyer Island, Admiralty Sound, Antarctica, from North. Photo taken by Otto Nordenskjöld during the Swedish Antarctic Expedition

64°27′S 57°36′W. An island 2.5 nautical miles (4.6 km; 2.9 mi) long, lying off the south shore of James Ross Island in the southwest entrance to Admiralty Sound. Named Cape Lockyer by Captain James Clark Ross, 7 January 1843, at the request of Captain Francis R.M. Crozier in honor of the latter's friend, Captain Nicholas Lockyer, RN. The insularity of the feature was determined by the SwedAE under Nordenskjold in 1902.

=== Cockburn Island ===
64°12′S 56°51′W. A circular island 1 nautical mile (1.9 km; 1.2 mi) in diameter, consisting of a high plateau with steep slopes surmounted on the northwest side by a pyramidal peak 450 metres (1,480 ft) high, lying in the northeast entrance to Admiralty Sound. Discovered by a British expedition under James Clark Ross, 1839–43, who named it for Admiral George Cockburn, Royal Navy, then Senior Naval Lord of the Admiralty.

=== Devil Island ===
63°48′S 57°17′W. A narrow island 1 nautical mile (1.9 km; 1.2 mi) long with a low summit on each end, lying in the center of a small bay 1 nautical mile (1.9 km; 1.2 mi) southeast of Cape Well-met, northern Vega Island. Discovered and named by the SwedAE, 1901–04, under Otto Nordenskjöld.

== See also ==
- James Ross Island Volcanic Group

== Sources ==
- Alberts, Fred G., ed. (1995), Geographic Names of the Antarctic (PDF) (2 ed.), United States Board on Geographic Names This article incorporates public domain material from websites or documents of the United States Board on Geographic Names.
- Davies, Dr. Bethan, "James Ross Island : Department of Geography & Earth Sciences, Aberystwyth University", www.aber.ac.uk
- Graham Land and South Shetland Islands, BAS: British Antarctic Survey, 2005

This article incorporates public domain material from websites or documents of the United States Geological Survey.
