= Devil Island =

Island of Antarctica

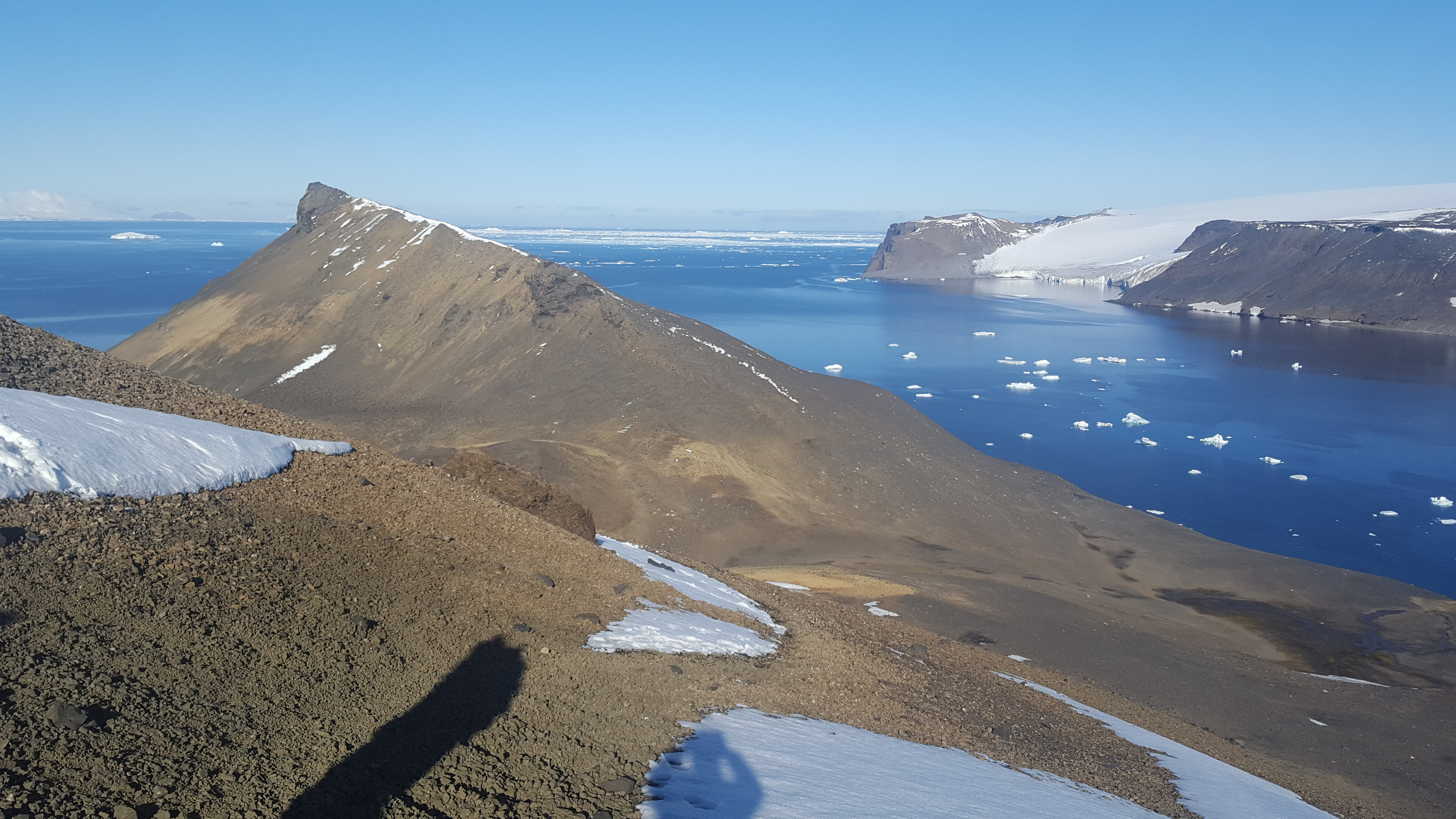
- View from top of volcanic peak

- Location of Devil Island

- Location in Antarctica Devil Island (Antarctica)

Geography
- Location: Antarctica
- Coordinates: 63°48′S 57°17′W
- Archipelago: James Ross Island group

Administration
- None
- Administered under the Antarctic Treaty System.

Devil Island is a 128 ha, ice-free island about 2 km long, in the James Ross Island group near the north-eastern tip of the Antarctic Peninsula. It lies in a small cove 1 km north of Vega Island, east of the Trinity Peninsula. It is characterised by several low hills rising to a maximum height of about 150 m.

== Geography ==
Devil island is a recent volcano consisting of two basalt volcano necks, surrounded by extensive talus.

== Important Bird Area ==
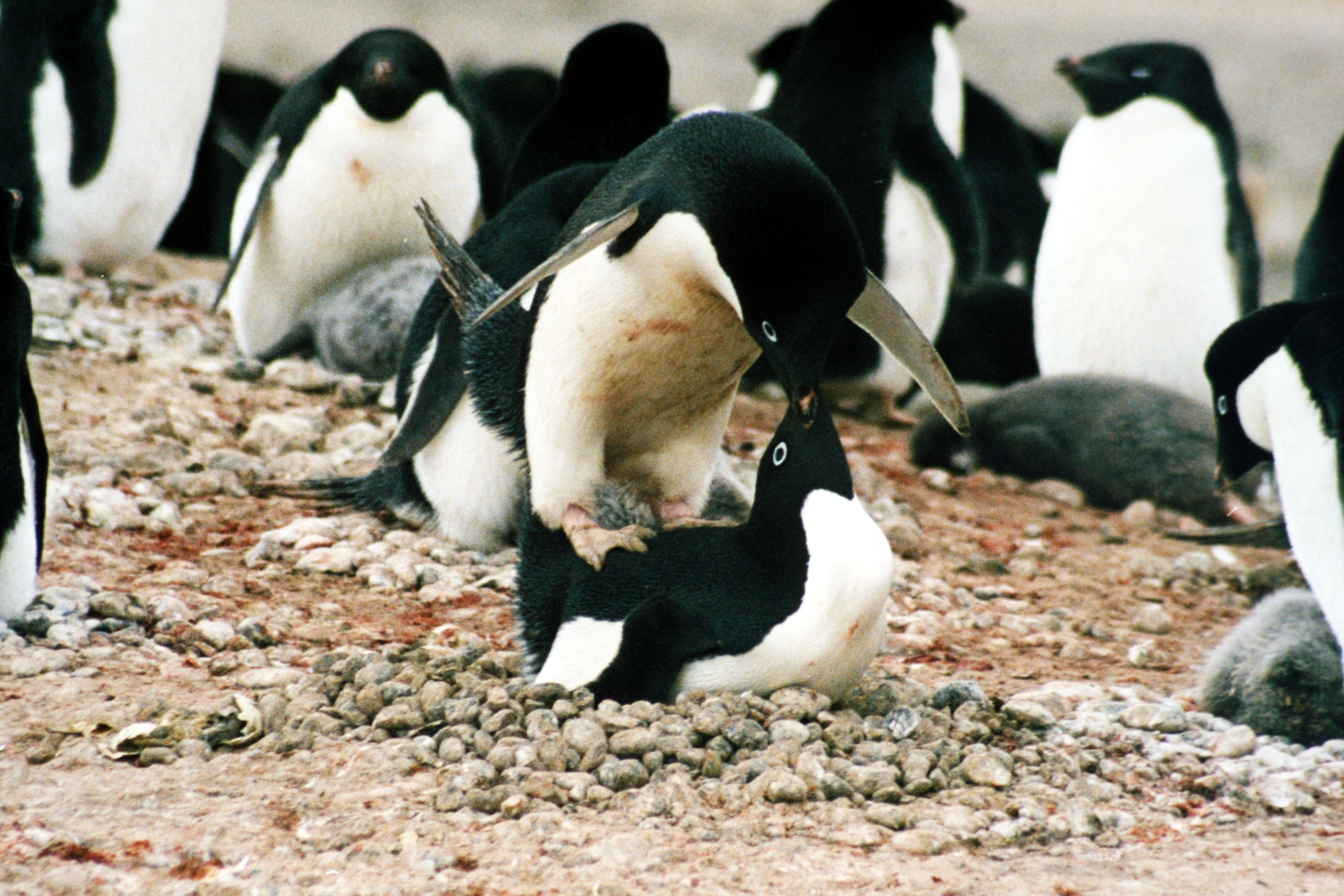
The island is an important breeding site for Adélie penguins

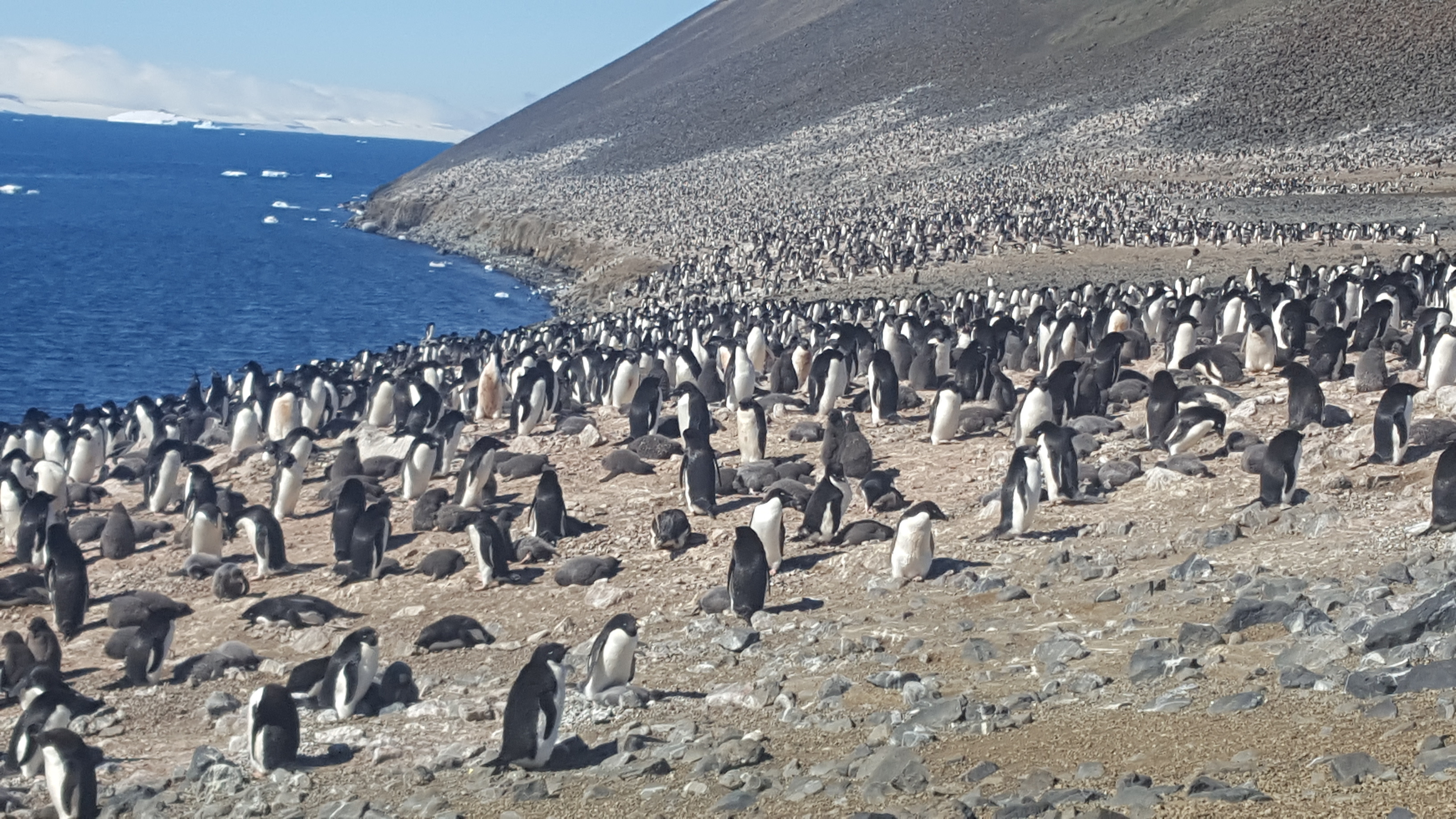

The site has been identified as an Important Bird Area (IBA) by BirdLife International because it supports a large breeding colony of about 15,000 pairs of Adélie penguins. Other birds recorded as nesting there include brown skuas and snow petrels.
