= Virgin Hill =

Hill in James Ross Island, Antarctica

Virgin Hill (63°56′S 58°9′W) is a hill rising to 665 m west of Carro Pass, James Ross Island. The name derives from "Cerro Virgen de las Nieves" (Virgin of the Snows hill) applied by Argentine Antarctic Expeditions, 1978. A more concise English form of the name has been approved.
