= Cugnot Ice Piedmont =

Ice piedmont

- Location within Antarctica
- Location: Trinity Peninsula, Graham Land, Antarctica
- Coordinates: 63°38′S 58°10′W
- Terminus: Prince Gustav Channel

Cugnot Ice Piedmont (63°38′S 58°10′W) is an ice piedmont in Trinity Peninsula, Antarctica. It is about 15 nautical miles (28 km; 17 mi) long and between 3 and 6 nautical miles (5.6 and 11.1 km; 3.5 and 6.9 mi) wide, extending from Russell East Glacier to Eyrie Bay and bounded on the landward side by Louis Philippe Plateau.

== Location ==
Trinity Peninsula, Antarctic Peninsula. Cugnot Ice Piedmont in center of southeast coast

Cugnot Ice Piedmont is in Graham Land in the center of the south coast of the Trinity Peninsula, which forms the tip of the Antarctic Peninsula. It is on the coast of the Prince Gustav Channel to the south of the Louis Philippe Plateau and Broad Valley. Eyre Bay is to the northeast and Russell East Glacier is to the southwest. Features, from west to east, include Benz Pass, Panhard Nunatak, Levassor Nunatak, Chapel Hill, Shelter Cove, Church Point, Striped Hill, Camp Hill, McCalman Peak, Crystal Hill, Bald Head and Jade Point.

== Exploration and name ==
Cugnot Ice Piedmont was mapped from surveys by the Falkland Islands Dependencies Survey (FIDS; 1960–61), and was named by the UK Antarctic Place-Names Committee (UK-APC) for Nicolas-Joseph Cugnot (1725-1804), a French military engineer who designed and built the first full-sized vehicle propelled by its own engine (steam), in 1769.

== Western features ==
Features of the west part of the ice piedmont include, from west to east,

=== Chochoveni Nunatak ===
63°40′21″S 58°18′16″W. A rocky hill rising to 701 metres (2,300 ft) high in the southwest part of Cugnot Ice Piedmont. Situated 3.87 kilometres (2.40 mi) south by east of Smin Peak, 4.29 kilometres (2.67 mi) northwest of Kolobar Nunatak, 3.34 kilometres (2.08 mi) northeast of Coburg Peak and 5.75 kilometres (3.57 mi) east of Drenta Bluff. German-British mapping in 1996. Named after the settlements of Golyamo Chochoveni and Malko Chochoveni in Southeastern Bulgaria.

=== Kolobar Nunatak ===
63°41′31″S 58°13′46″W. A rocky hill rising to 541 metres (1,775 ft) high in the southwest part of Cugnot Ice Piedmont. Situated 3.59 kilometres (2.23 mi) northeast of Panhard Nunatak, 4.29 kilometres (2.67 mi) southeast of Chochoveni Nunatak and 5.66 kilometres (3.52 mi) southwest of Levassor Nunatak. German-British mapping in 1996. Named after the settlement of Kolobar in Northeastern Bulgaria.

=== Levassor Nunatak ===
63°40′S 58°07′W. A conspicuous horseshoe-shaped nunatak 1 nautical mile (1.9 km; 1.2 mi) inland in the middle of Cugnot Ice Piedmont. Mapped from surveys by FIDS (1960-61). Named by UK-APC for Émile Levassor (1844–1897), French engineer, who in 1891 was jointly responsible with René Panhard for a motor car design which originated the principles on which most subsequent developments were based.

=== Bratsigovo Hills ===
63°39′10″S 58°00′00″W. A chain of rocky hills rising to 400 metres (1,300 ft) high and extending from the coast of Prince Gustav Channel 4 kilometres (2.5 mi) northwards. Situated on the southeast side of Cugnot Ice Piedmont, 3.77 kilometres (2.34 mi) west of Chernopeev Peak and 6.5 kilometres (4.0 mi) east-northeast of Levassor Nunatak. German–British mapping in 1996. Named after the town of Bratsigovo in Southern Bulgaria.

== Central features ==
Features around Church Point include, from west to east,

=== Chapel Hill ===
63°41′S 57°58′W. A hill, 140 metres (460 ft) high, forming the summit of a headland 1.5 nautical miles (2.8 km; 1.7 mi) west-southwest of Church Point. Charted by the Falkland Islands Dependencies Survey (FIDS) in 1946, who so named it because of its proximity to Church Point.

=== Shelter Cove ===
63°41′S 57°57′W. A small coastal indentation on the north shore of Prince Gustav Channel, between Chapel Hill and Church Point. The name, given by UK-APC, is descriptive of the only part of this coast which is sufficiently sheltered from the prevailing southwest winds to afford a reliable camp site.

=== Chernopeev Peak ===
63°39′29″S 57°55′29″W. A rocky peak rising to 521 metres (1,709 ft) high on the southeast side of Cugnot Ice Piedmont, 2.5 kilometres (1.6 mi) north of Church Point, 102 kilometres (63 mi) east-northeast of Levassor Nunatak, 2.89 kilometres (1.80 mi) south-southwest of Kribul Hill and 8.5 kilometres (5.3 mi) southwest of McCalman Peak. German–British mapping in 1996. Named after Hristo Chernopeev (1868-1915), a leader of the Bulgarian liberation movement in Macedonia.

=== Church Point ===
63°41′S 57°55′W. A point 2 nautical miles (3.7 km; 2.3 mi) west of Camp Hill. The feature was sighted by Swedish Antarctic Expedition (SwedAE) in 1903. It was surveyed by FIDS in 1945 and so named because the point rises to a rock peak 355 metres (1,165 ft) high, the sides of which resemble a church steeple.

=== Striped Hill ===
63°40′S 57°53′W. A small ice-free hill, 90 metres (300 ft) high, standing near the south shore of Trinity Peninsula, 1 nautical mile (1.9 km; 1.2 mi) east-northeast of Church Point. Charted and named by the FIDS, 1946. The descriptive name is derived from the stratifications on a small cliff on the seaward side of the hill.

=== Botany Bay ===
63°41′S 57°53′W. A small bay between Church Point and Camp Hill on the south coast of Trinity Peninsula. Surveyed by FIDS, December 1946, and named by UK-APC from the fossil plants collected there.

=== Camp Hill ===
63°41′S 57°52′W. Small ice-free hill, 120 metres (390 ft) high, which lies 2 nautical miles (3.7 km; 2.3 mi) east of Church Point. Charted in 1946 by the FIDS, who so named it because a geological camp was established at the foot of the hill.

== Eastern features ==
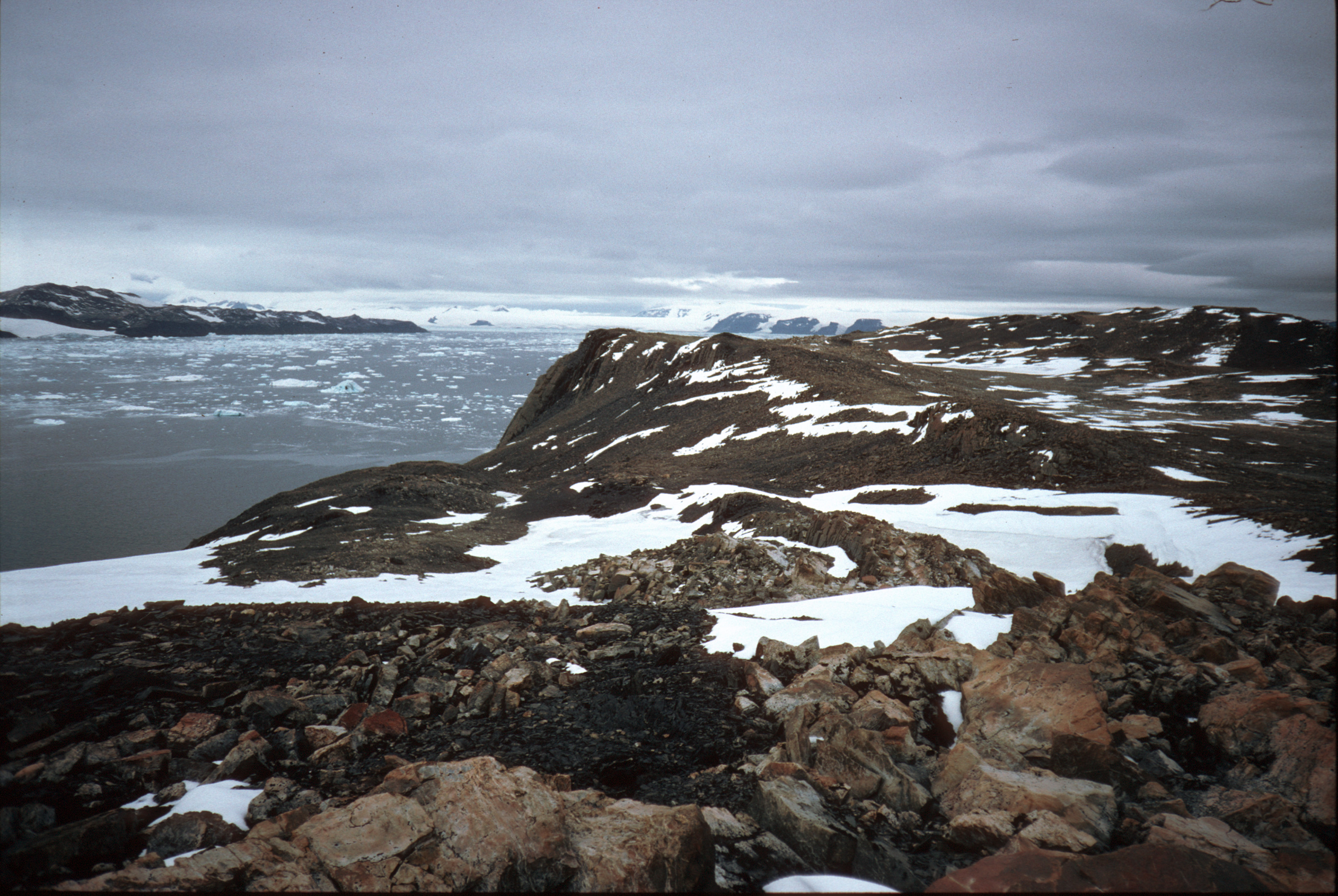
Jade Point

=== Kribul Hill ===
63°37′59″S 57°54′32″W. A rocky hill rising to 501 metres (1,644 ft) high on Trinity Peninsula. Situated on the southeast side of Cugnot Ice Piedmont, 2.71 kilometres (1.68 mi) west-southwest of Gornik Knoll, 5.27 kilometres (3.27 mi) north of Church Point and 7.88 kilometres (4.90 mi) south by west of Marten Crag. German–British mapping in 1996. Named after the settlement of Kribul in Southwestern Bulgaria.

=== Gornik Knoll ===
63°37′36″S 57°51′22″W. A rocky hill rising to 477 metres (1,565 ft) high on Trinity Peninsula. Situated on the southeast side of Cugnot Ice Piedmont, 3.97 kilometres (2.47 mi) west-southwest of McCalman Peak, 2.71 kilometres (1.68 mi) east-northeast of Kribul Hill and 7.25 kilometres (4.50 mi) south-southeast of Marten Crag. German–British mapping in 1996. Named after the settlement of Gornik in Northern Bulgaria.

=== McCalman Peak ===
63°37′S 57°47′W. The 550 metres (1,800 ft) high summit of an east–west trending ridge 3 nautical miles (5.6 km; 3.5 mi) north of Crystal Hill. Named by UK-APC for Donald McCalman, FIDS surveyor at Hope Bay, 1958-59.

=== Crystal Hill ===
63°39′S 57°44′W. Ice-free hill, 150 metres (490 ft) high, forming the summit of a headland between Bald Head and Camp Hill on the south side of Trinity Peninsula. So named by the FIDS because crystals were collected at the foot of the hill in 1945 and 1946.

=== Yatrus Promontory ===
63°36′50″S 57°41′10″W. A predominantly ice-free promontory projecting 8 kilometres (5.0 mi) in east direction into Prince Gustav Channel south of Eyrie Bay. Ending in Jade Point to the east and Bald Head to the southeast. Named after the ancient Roman town of Yatrus in Northern Bulgaria.

=== Zaldapa Ridge ===
63°36′30″S 57°41′34″W. A predominantly ice-free ridge extending 4.6 kilometres (2.9 mi) in an east–west direction and 1.7 kilometres (1.1 mi) wide on Yatrus Promontory. The ridge's twin rocky summits rise to 385 metres (1,263 ft) and 365 metres (1,198 ft) high respectively, with the higher western one situated 4.55 kilometres (2.83 mi) east-northeast of McCalman Peak and 4.75 kilometres (2.95 mi) west by south of Jade Point. Named after the ancient Thracian and Roman town of Zaldapa in Northeastern Bulgaria.

=== Bald Head ===
63°38′S 57°36′W. A bare, ice-free headland 8 nautical miles (15 km; 9.2 mi) southwest of View Point. Probably first seen in 1902-03 by J. Gunnar Andersson's party of the SwedAE under Otto Nordenskjöld. The FIDS charted it and applied the descriptive name in 1945.

=== Jade Point ===
63°36′S 57°35′W. A gently sloping rocky point forming the south limit of Eyrie Bay. Named by the UK-APC. The lower slopes of the point are permanently sheathed in greenish-tinged ice, which suggested the descriptive name.

== Sources ==
- Alberts, Fred G., ed. (1995), Geographic Names of the Antarctic (PDF) (2 ed.), United States Board on Geographic Names This article incorporates public domain material from websites or documents of the United States Board on Geographic Names.

REMA Explorer
The Reference Elevation Model of Antarctica (REMA) gives ice surface measurements of most of the continent. When a feature is ice-covered, the ice surface will differ from the underlying rock surface and will change over time. To see ice surface contours and elevation of a feature as of the last REMA update,
- Open the Antarctic REMA Explorer
- Enter the feature's coordinates in the box at the top left that says "Find address or place", then press enter
  The coordinates should be in DMS format, e.g. 65°05'03"S 64°01'02"W. If you only have degrees and minutes, you may not be able to locate the feature.
- Hover over the icons at the left of the screen
- Find "Hillshade" and click on that
  In the bottom right of the screen, set "Shading Factor" to 0 to get a clearer image
- Find "Contour" and click on that
  In the "Contour properties" box, select Contour Interval = 1m
  You can zoom in and out to see the ice surface contours of the feature and nearby features
- Find "Identify" and click on that
  Click the point where the contour lines seem to indicate the top of the feature
  The "Identify" box will appear to the top left. The Orthometric height is the elevation of the ice surface of the feature at this point.

- Antarctic REMA Explorer (Digital Elevation Models created by the Polar Geospatial Center from Maxar imagery), Polar Geospatial Center, University of Minnesota, 2019
- "Bratsigovo Hills", Composite Gazetteer of Antarctica, Scientific Committee on Antarctic Research
- "Chernopeev Peak", Composite Gazetteer of Antarctica, Scientific Committee on Antarctic Research
- "Chochoveni Nunatak", Composite Gazetteer of Antarctica, Scientific Committee on Antarctic Research
- "Gornik Knoll", Composite Gazetteer of Antarctica, Scientific Committee on Antarctic Research
- Graham Land and South Shetland Islands, BAS: British Antarctic Survey, 2005
- "Kolobar Nunatak", Composite Gazetteer of Antarctica, Scientific Committee on Antarctic Research
- "Kribul Hill", Composite Gazetteer of Antarctica, Scientific Committee on Antarctic Research
- Trinity Peninsula (PDF) (Scale 1:250000 topographic map No. 5697), Institut für Angewandte Geodäsie and British Antarctic Survey, 1996, archived from the original (PDF) on 23 September 2015
- "Yatrus Promontory", Composite Gazetteer of Antarctica, Scientific Committee on Antarctic Research
- "Zaldapa Ridge", Composite Gazetteer of Antarctica, Scientific Committee on Antarctic Research

This article incorporates public domain material from websites or documents of the United States Geological Survey.
