= Broad Valley =

Valley in Antarctica

- Location within Antarctica

Geography
- Location: Trinity Peninsula, Graham Land, Antarctica
- Coordinates: 63°32′S 57°55′W
- Interactive map of Broad Valley

Broad Valley (63°32′S 57°55′W (Note: Alberts 1995 gives the coordindates of Broad Valley as 63°22′S 57°55′W. This appears to be a typo, putting it 10' to far north)) is a descriptive name for the broad glacier-filled valley on the south side of Laclavere Plateau, Trinity Peninsula, Antarctica. The name was suggested by V.I. Russell of the Falkland Islands Dependencies Survey (FIDS) following his survey in 1946.

== Location ==
Trinity Peninsula, Antarctic Peninsula. Broad Valley towards northeast end

Broad Valley is in Graham Land towards the north of the Trinity Peninsula, which forms the tip of the Antarctic Peninsula. It is south of the Laclavère Plateau, west of Duse Bay, north of Eyrie Bay and east of Cugnot Ice Piedmont and Louis Philippe Plateau, from which it is separated by Windy Gap. Misty Pass leads northwest from the valley to the Cockerell Peninsula. Features and nearby features include Stepup Col, Cain Nunatak, Abel Nunatak and View Point.

== Features ==
Features from west to east include:

=== Windy Gap ===
63°34′S 58°09′W. Pass 975 metres (3,199 ft) high, located at the northeast end of Louis Philippe Plateau. It marks the meeting place of three valleys of Trinity Peninsula, namely Broad Valley leading eastward toward Duse Bay, a valley leading northward to Lafond Bay, and another southward to Prince Gustav Channel. Discovered by the Falkland Islands Dependencies Survey (FIDS) and so named because of the very bad weather experienced in the pass during a survey journey in April 1946.

=== Yarlovo Nunatak ===
63°32′52″S 57°58′17″W. A rocky hill rising to 739 metres (2,425 ft) high on Trinity Peninsula. Situated in the northern foothills of Giovannini (Lobell) Ridge, 4.53 kilometres (2.81 mi) west-northwest of Marten Crag, 6.72 kilometres (4.18 mi) south of Prilep Knoll and 11.48 kilometres (7.13 mi) southwest of Kanitz Nunatak. Surmounting Broad Valley to the north. German-British mapping in 1996. Named after the settlement of Yarlovo in Western Bulgaria.

=== Marten Crag ===
63°33′46″S 57°53′12″W. A rocky peak rising to 665 metres (2,182 ft) high on Trinity Peninsula. Situated between Stepup Col and the eastern foothills of Giovannini (Lobell) Ridge, 8.2 kilometres (5.1 mi) northwest of McCalman Peak, 7.88 kilometres (4.90 mi) north by east of Kribul Hill, 4.53 kilometres (2.81 mi) east-southeast of Yarlovo Nunatak, 9.58 kilometres (5.95 mi) southwest of Kanitz Nunatak and 3.08 kilometres (1.91 mi) west of Kumata Hill. Surmounting Broad Valley to the north and Cugnot Ice Piedmont to the SE. German-British mapping in 1996. Named after the town of Marten in Northeastern Bulgaria.

=== Stepup Col ===
63°34′S 57°51′W. A snow-covered north–south running col linking Broad Valley and Cugnot Ice Piedmont, at the east end of Louis Philippe Plateau. The name given by UK Antarctic Place-Names Committee (UK-APC) is descriptive, as 100 feet (30 m) in height is gained when the col is traversed in a northerly direction.

=== Kumata Hill ===
63°33′35″S 57°49′30″W. A partly ice-free hill rising to 552 metres (1,811 ft) high on Trinity Peninsula. Situated east of Stepup Col, 6.9 kilometres (4.3 mi) north-northwest of McCalman Peak, 3.08 kilometres (1.91 mi) east of Marten Crag, 7.88 kilometres (4.90 mi) south-southwest of Kanitz Nunatak and 3.37 kilometres (2.09 mi) west-southwest of Cain Nunatak. Surmounting Broad Valley to the north and Cugnot Ice Piedmont to the S. German-British mapping in 1996. Named after the Kumata locality on Vitosha Mountain in Western Bulgaria.

=== Cain Nunatak ===
63°34′S 57°42′W. The westernmost of two isolated nunataks on the south side of Broad Valley. The name arose at the time of the FIDS geological survey in 1960-61 and is in association with nearby Abel Nunatak.

=== Abel Nunatak ===
63°33′S 57°41′W. The easternmost of two isolated nunataks on the south side of Broad Valley. The name arose at the time of the FIDS geological survey in 1960-61 and is in association with nearby Cain Nunatak.

=== Eyrie Bay ===
63°35′S 57°38′W. A bay, 2.5 nautical miles (4.6 km; 2.9 mi) wide at its mouth and extending 3 nautical miles (5.6 km; 3.5 mi) inland, lying north of Jade Point. So named by UK-APC because of the proximity to Eagle Island.

== Sources ==
- Alberts, Fred G., ed. (1995), Geographic Names of the Antarctic (PDF) (2 ed.), United States Board on Geographic Names This article incorporates public domain material from websites or documents of the United States Board on Geographic Names.

REMA Explorer
The Reference Elevation Model of Antarctica (REMA) gives ice surface measurements of most of the continent. When a feature is ice-covered, the ice surface will differ from the underlying rock surface and will change over time. To see ice surface contours and elevation of a feature as of the last REMA update,
- Open the Antarctic REMA Explorer
- Enter the feature's coordinates in the box at the top left that says "Find address or place", then press enter
  The coordinates should be in DMS format, e.g. 65°05'03"S 64°01'02"W. If you only have degrees and minutes, you may not be able to locate the feature.
- Hover over the icons at the left of the screen
- Find "Hillshade" and click on that
  In the bottom right of the screen, set "Shading Factor" to 0 to get a clearer image
- Find "Contour" and click on that
  In the "Contour properties" box, select Contour Interval = 1m
  You can zoom in and out to see the ice surface contours of the feature and nearby features
- Find "Identify" and click on that
  Click the point where the contour lines seem to indicate the top of the feature
  The "Identify" box will appear to the top left. The Orthometric height is the elevation of the ice surface of the feature at this point.

- Antarctic REMA Explorer (Digital Elevation Models created by the Polar Geospatial Center from Maxar imagery), Polar Geospatial Center, University of Minnesota, 2019
- Graham Land and South Shetland Islands, BAS: British Antarctic Survey, 2005
- "Kumata Hill", Composite Gazetteer of Antarctica, Scientific Committee on Antarctic Research
- "Marten Crag", Composite Gazetteer of Antarctica, Scientific Committee on Antarctic Research
- Trinity Peninsula (PDF) (Scale 1:250000 topographic map No. 5697), Institut für Angewandte Geodäsie and British Antarctic Survey, 1996, archived from the original (PDF) on 23 September 2015
- "Yarlovo Nunatak", Composite Gazetteer of Antarctica, Scientific Committee on Antarctic Research

This article incorporates public domain material from websites or documents of the United States Geological Survey.
