= Paulet Island =

Island of Antarctica

- Location of Paulet Island

- Location within Antarctica

Geography
- Location: Antarctica
- Coordinates: 63°35′S 55°47′W
- Archipelago: Joinville Island group
- Length: 1.5 km (0.93 mi)
- Width: 1.5 km (0.93 mi)

Administration
- Administered under the Antarctic Treaty System

Demographics
- Population: Uninhabited

Paulet Island
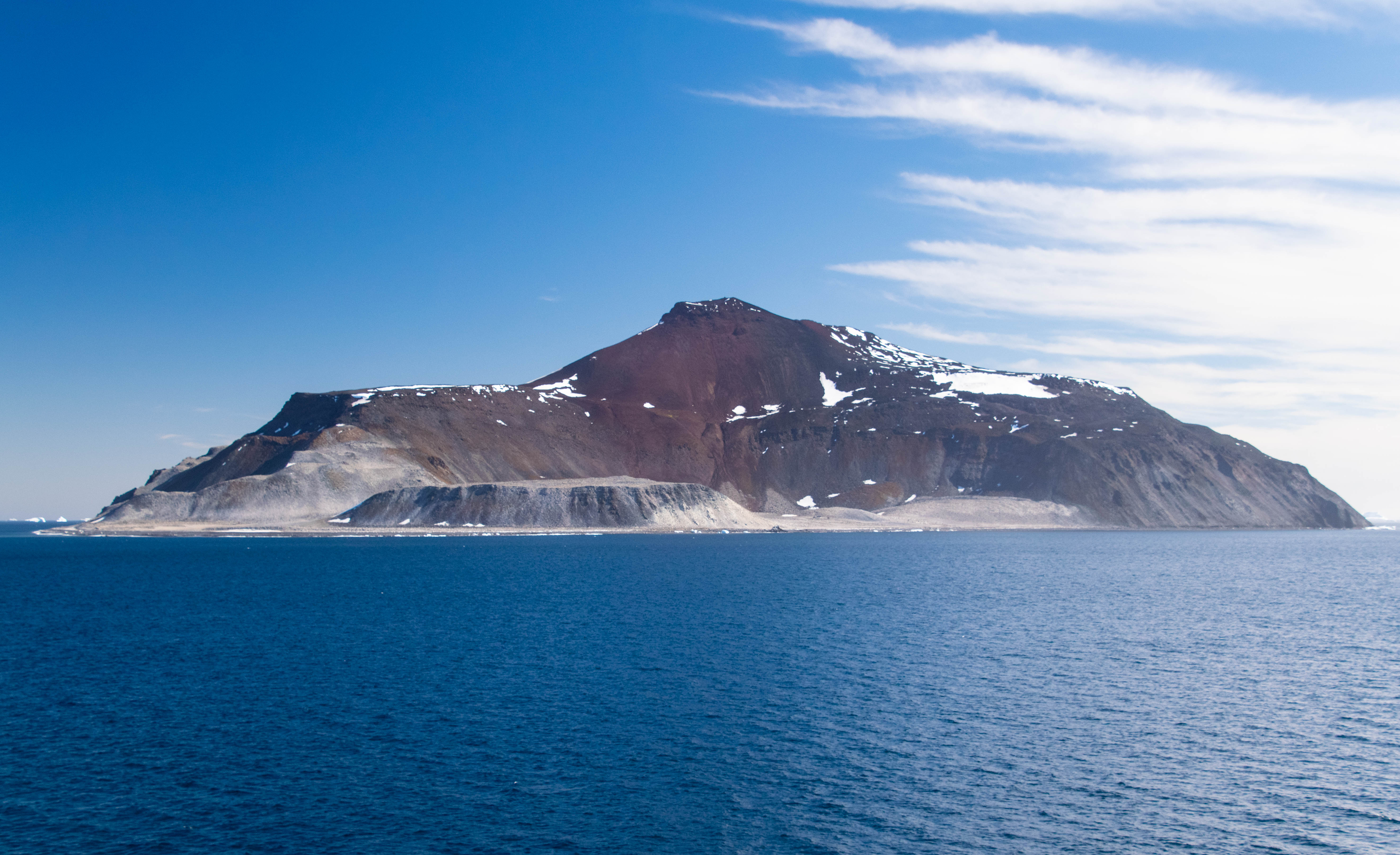
- Paulet Island, December 2021

Highest point
- Elevation: 353 m (1,158 ft)
- Prominence: 353 m (1,158 ft)
- Coordinates: 63°35′S 55°47′W

Geography
- Location: Antarctic Peninsula, Antarctica

Geology
- Mountain type: Cinder cone
- Last eruption: Unknown

Paulet Island is a circular island about 1.5 km (0.93 mi) in diameter, lying 4.5 km (2.8 mi) south-east of Dundee Island, off the north-eastern end of the Antarctic Peninsula. Because of its large penguin colony, it is a popular destination for sightseeing tours.

== Description ==
The island is composed of lava flows capped by a cinder cone with a small summit crater. Geothermal heat keeps parts of the island ice-free, and the youthful morphology of the volcano suggests that it was last active within the last 1,000 years. The island is part of the James Ross Island Volcanic Group.

== Historic monuments ==
Paulet Island was discovered by a British expedition (1839–1843) under James Clark Ross and named by him for Captain the Right Honorable Lord George Paulet, Royal Navy.

In 1903 during the Swedish Antarctic Expedition led by Otto Nordenskiöld his ship Antarctic was crushed and sunk by the ice off the coast of the island. A stone hut built in February 1903 by shipwreck survivors, together with the grave of an expedition member, and the cairn built on the highest point of the island to draw the attention of rescuers, have been designated a Historic Site or Monument (HSM 41), following a proposal by Argentina and the United Kingdom to the Antarctic Treaty Consultative Meeting. The shipwrecked crew of the Endurance planned to travel to the island and use stores there that were left by the Swedish Expedition, but the ice pack that they were stranded on eventually drifted too far east.

== Important Bird Area ==
The island has been identified as an Important Bird Area (IBA) by BirdLife International because it supports a very large breeding colony of about 100,000 pairs of Adélie penguins. Other birds known to nest on the island include imperial shags, snow petrels and kelp gulls.

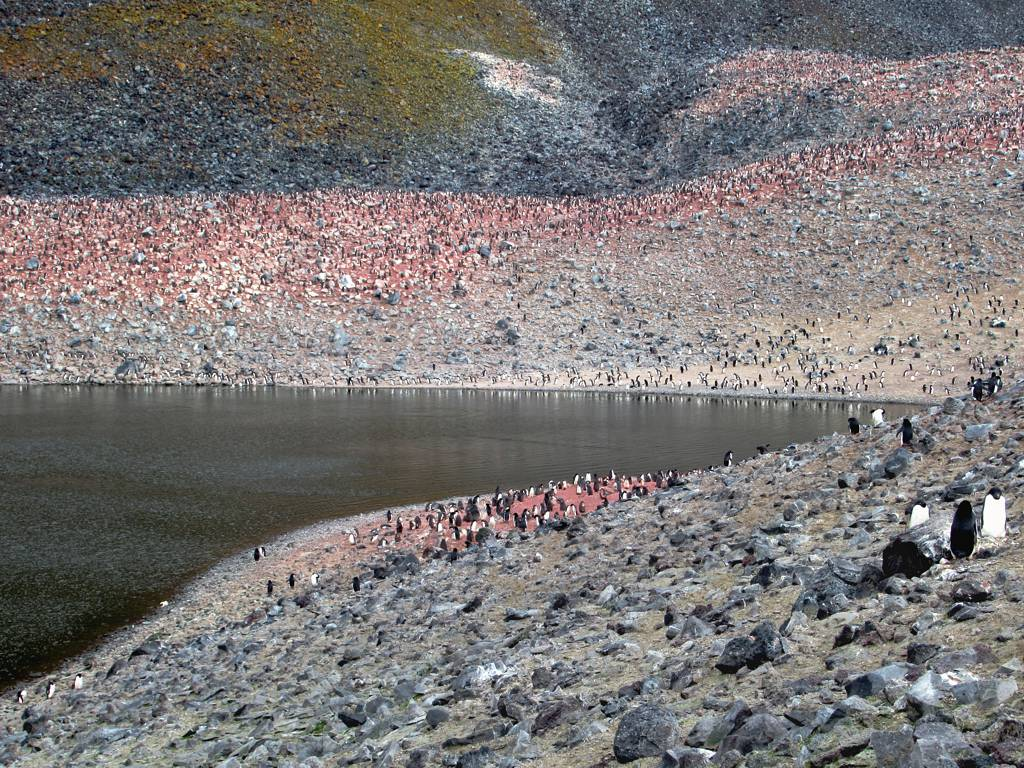
One of the meltwater lakes

== Gallery ==
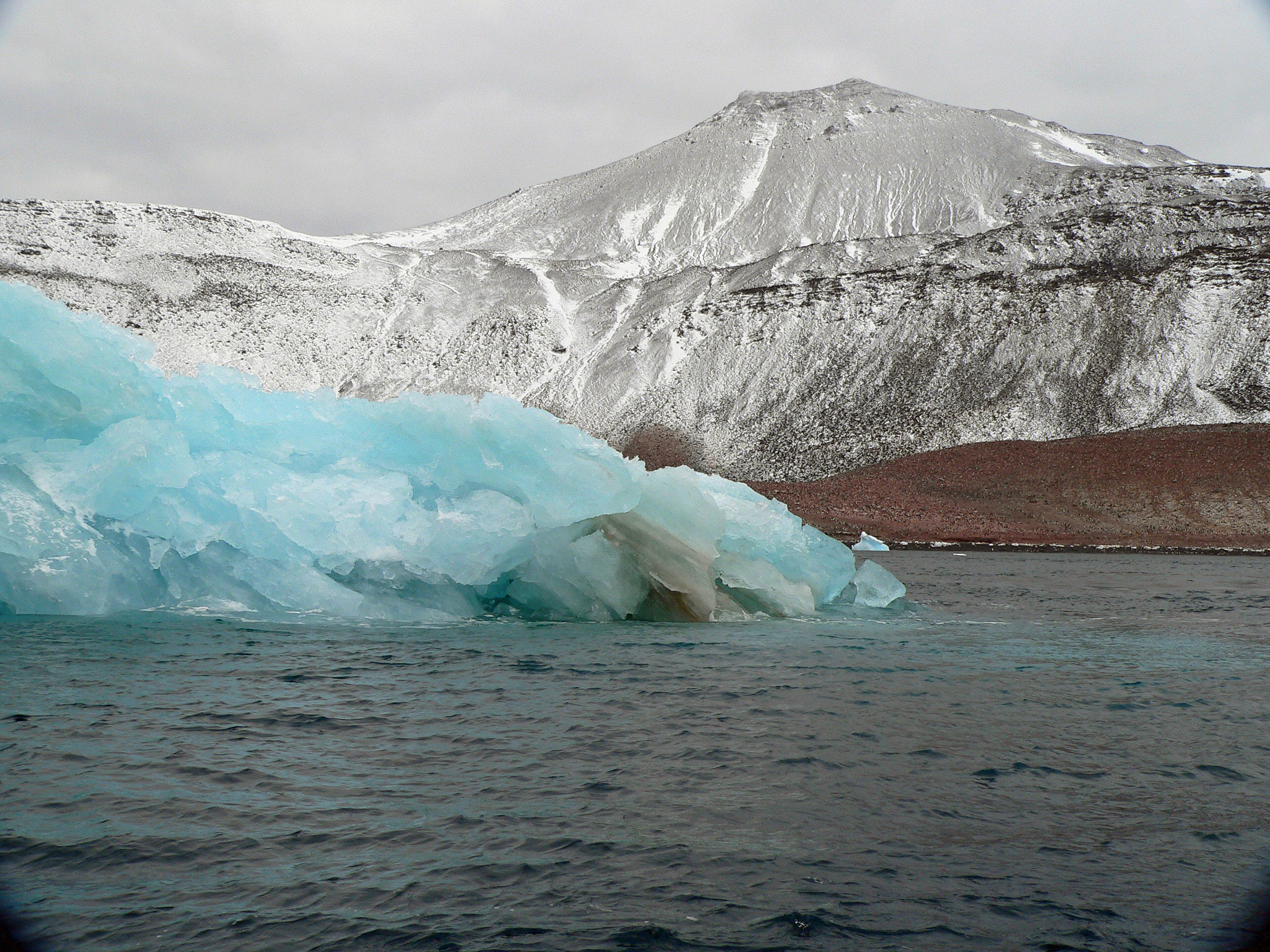
Paulet Island (February 2007)

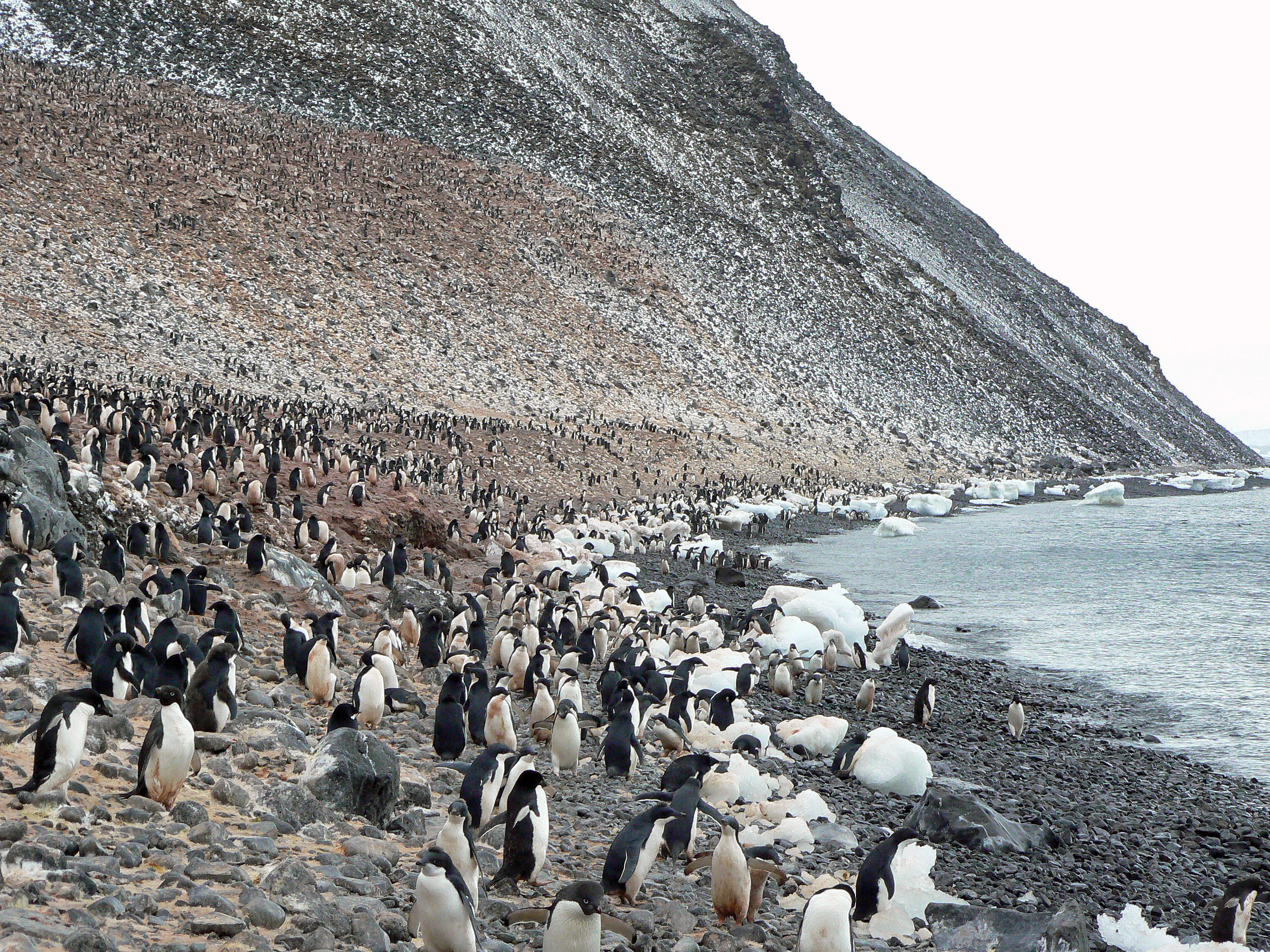
Adelie penguin colony on Paulet Island

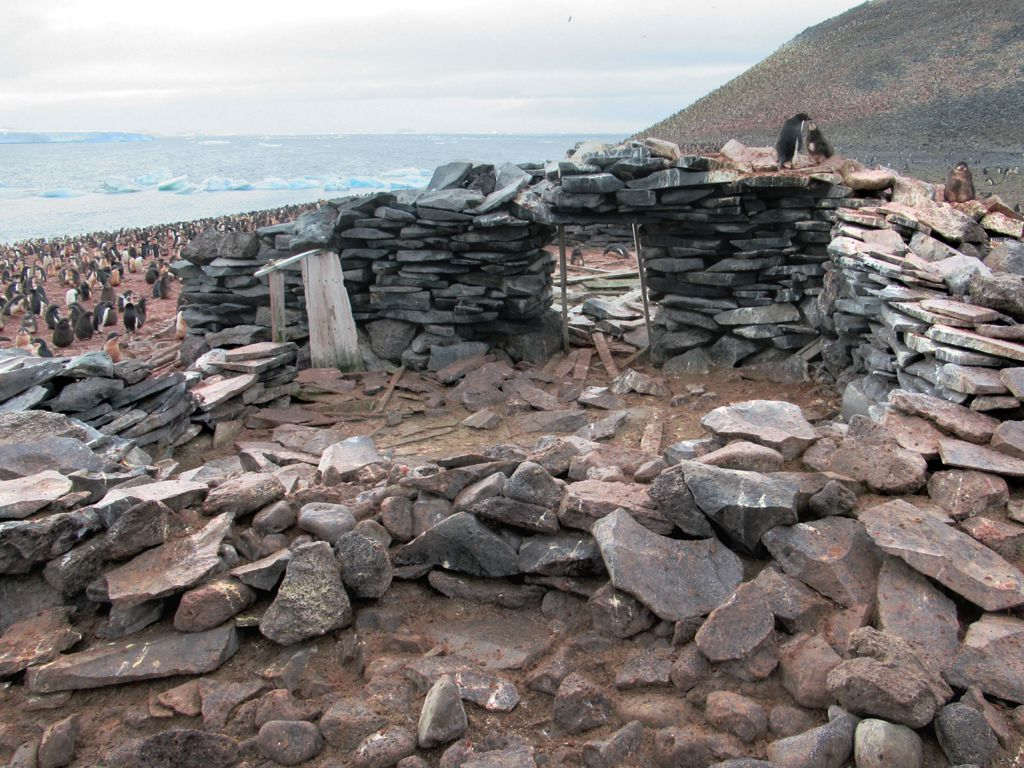
Nordenskjöld Expedition Shelter (2022)

== See also ==
- List of Antarctic and subantarctic islands
- List of volcanoes in Antarctica

== Bibliography ==
- Antarctica. Sydney: Reader's Digest, 1985, pp. 152–159.
- Child, Jack. Antarctica and South American Geopolitics: Frozen Lebensraum. New York: Praeger Publishers, 1988, pp. 69, 72.
- Lonely Planet, Antarctica: a Lonely Planet Travel Survival Kit, Oakland, CA: Lonely Planet Publications, 1996, 302.
- Stewart, Andrew, Antarctica: An Encyclopedia. London: McFarland and Co., 1990 (2 volumes), p 752.
- U.S. National Science Foundation, Geographic Names of the Antarctic, Fred G. Alberts, ed. Washington: NSF, 1980.
- LeMasurier, W. E.; Thomson, J. W., eds. (1990). Volcanoes of the Antarctic Plate and Southern Oceans. American Geophysical Union. p. 512 pp. ISBN 0-87590-172-7.
