= Ernest Nice =

English cricketer

Ernest Herbert Leonard Nice (1 August 1875 – 6 June 1946) was an English first-class cricketer active 1895–1905 who played for Surrey. He was born in Earlswood Common, Surrey; died in Redhill.
