= Ameghino =

Ameghino may refer to:

== People ==
- Carlos Ameghino (1865-1936), Argentine paleontologist and explorer
- Florentino Ameghino (1853-1911), Argentine naturalist, paleontologist, anthropologist and zoologist
- Sabrina Ameghino (born 1980), Argentine sprint canoeist

== Locations ==
Argentina

- Florentino Ameghino, Buenos Aires, town in Buenos Aires Province
- Florentino Ameghino Partido, district in the northwest of Buenos Aires Province
- Carlos Ameghino Provincial Museum, natural science museum in La Plata, Buenos Aires Province
- Centro Ameghino, hospital in Buenos Aires
- Florentino Ameghino Department, in Chubut Province
- Florentino Ameghino Dam, gravity dam in Chubut Province
- Villa Dique Florentino Ameghino, commune in Chubut Province
- Florentino Ameghino, Misiones, municipality in Misiones Province

Elsewhere

- Ameghino Gully, landform in Longing Peninsula, Nordenskjold Coast, Antarctica
- Ameghino (crater), lunar crater
