= Maslarov Nunatak =

Antarctic nunatak

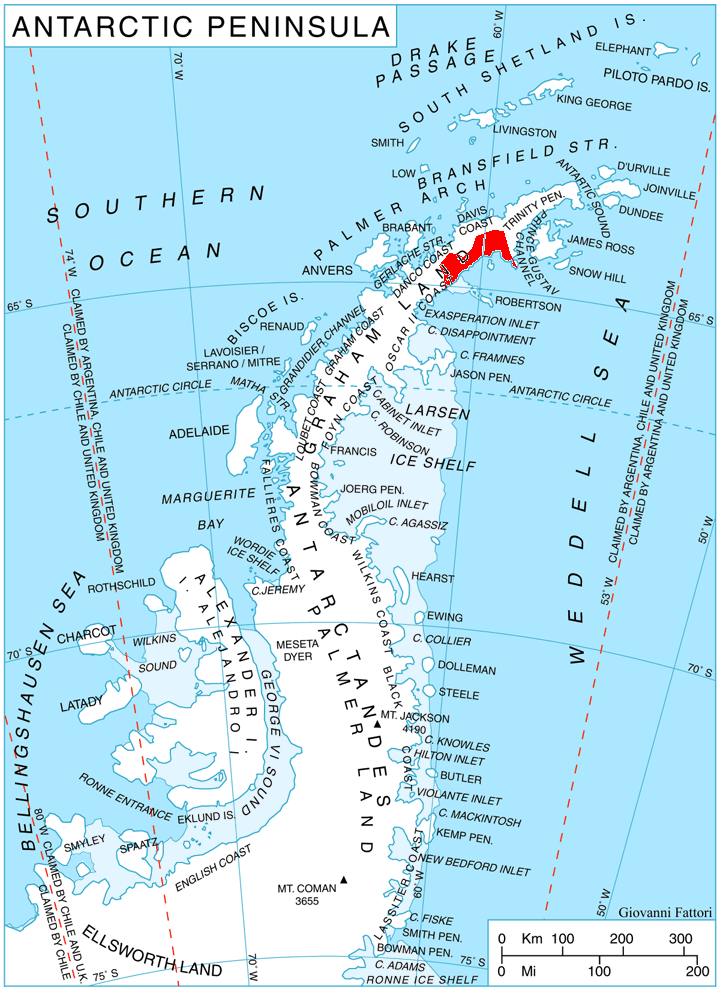
Location of Nordenskjöld Coast on Antarctic Peninsula

Maslarov Nunatak (Bulgarian: Масларов нунатак, romanized: Maslarov nunatak, IPA: [mɐsˈɫarof ˈnunɐtak]) is the rocky ridge 1.9 km long in northwest–southeast direction and 1.3 km wide, rising to 697 m at the northwest coast of Larsen Inlet on Nordenskjöld Coast in Graham Land, Antarctica.

The feature is named after Iliya Maslarov, cook at St. Kliment Ohridski base during the 1993/94 summer season, member of the team that repaired and inaugurated the base facilities, and set the practice of annual national Antarctic campaigns.

== Location ==
Maslarov Nunatak's summit is located at 64°20′17″S 59°40′45″W, which is 2.8 km southwest of Dolen Peak, 4.05 km north of Cletrac Peak, 5.7 km northeast of Skidoo Nunatak, 5.14 km east of Nodwell Peaks and 8.2 km southeast of Chipev Nunatak.

== Maps ==
- Antarctic Digital Database (ADD). Scale 1:250000 topographic map of Antarctica. Scientific Committee on Antarctic Research (SCAR). Since 1993, regularly upgraded and updated
