= Nodwell =

Nodwell may refer to:

- Bruce Nodwell (1914–2006), Canadian inventor and engineer
- Nodwell Peaks, Graham Land, Antarctic Peninsula, Antarctica
- Nodwell Indian Village; an archaeological site in Port Elgin, Ontario, Canada
- Nodwell tracked carrier, a caterpillar drive truck made by Robin-Nodwell Mfg. Ltd.; created by Bruce Nodwell
- Robin-Nodwell Mgf. Ltd.; makers of the Nodwell tracked carrier; a company founded by Bruce Nodwell
- Nodwell (UK), a British tractor company; see List of tractor manufacturers

== See also ==
- Well (disambiguation)
- NOD (disambiguation)
