= Sobral Peninsula =

Peninsula in northern Graham Land, Antarctica

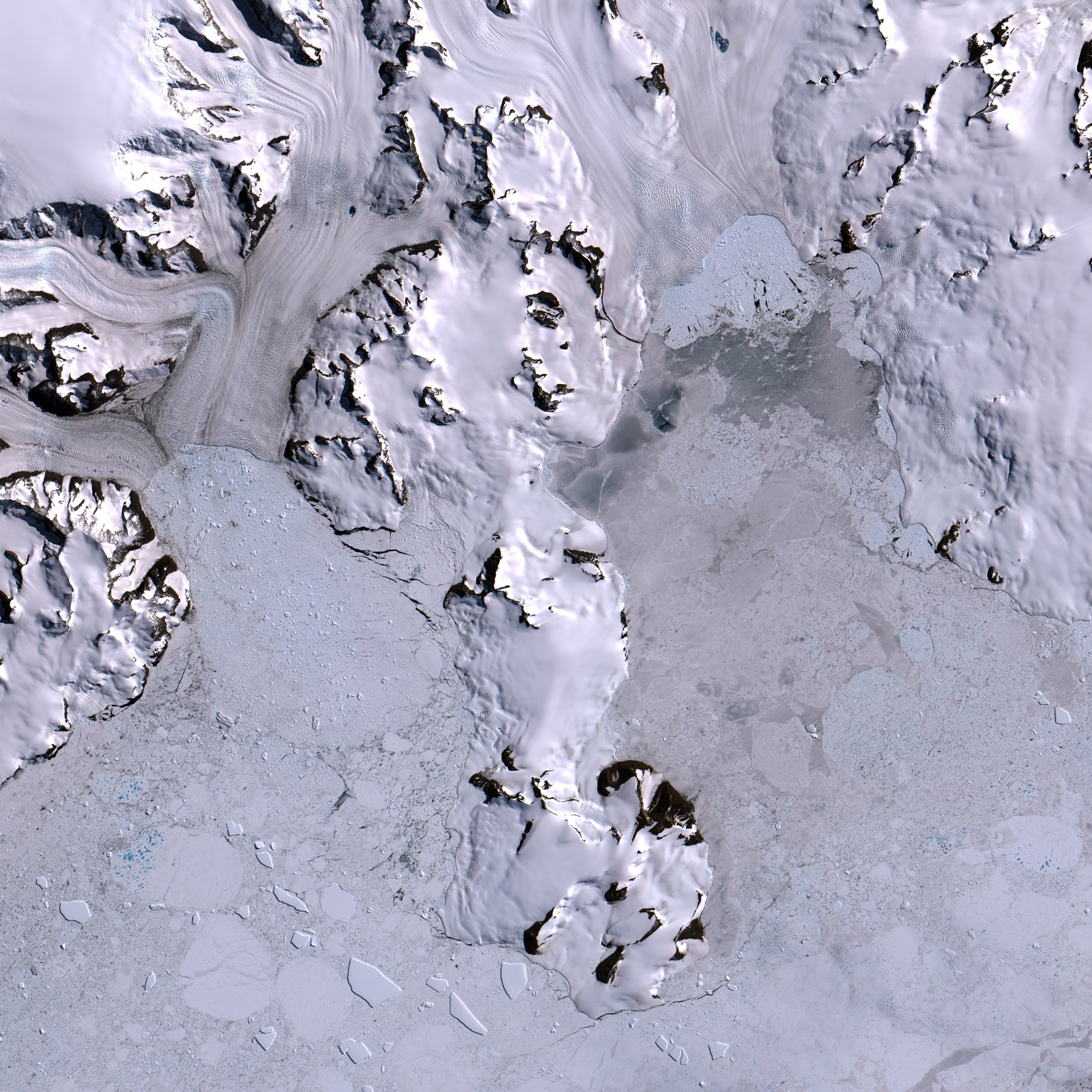
- Sobral Peninsula 31 January 2020

- Location within Antarctica

Geography
- Location: Nordenskjöld Coast, Graham Land, Antarctica
- Coordinates: 64°30′S 59°40′W

The Sobral Peninsula (64°30′S 59°40′W) is a high and mainly ice-covered peninsula in northern Graham Land, Antarctica. The feature is 11 nautical miles (20 km; 13 mi) long and 5 nautical miles (9.3 km; 5.8 mi) wide and projects southward into the northern part of the Larsen Ice Shelf west of Larsen Inlet.

== Location ==
Nordenskjöld Coast, Antarctic Peninsula. Sobral Peninsula at the northeast end

The Sobral Peninsula lies towards the east end of the Nordenskjöld Coast of the Antarctic Peninsula. It extends southward into the Weddell Sea. The Detroit Plateau and Mount Hornsby are to the north. To the east, Larsen Inlet separates the Sobral Peninsula from Mount Tucker and the Longing Peninsula. The Edgeworth Glacier flows into Mundraga Bay to the west.

- Copernix satellite image

== Name ==
The name "Sobral Peninsula" was applied by UK Antarctic Place-Names Committee (UK-APC) in 1963, and derives from Cape Sobral at the south end of this peninsula.

== Features ==
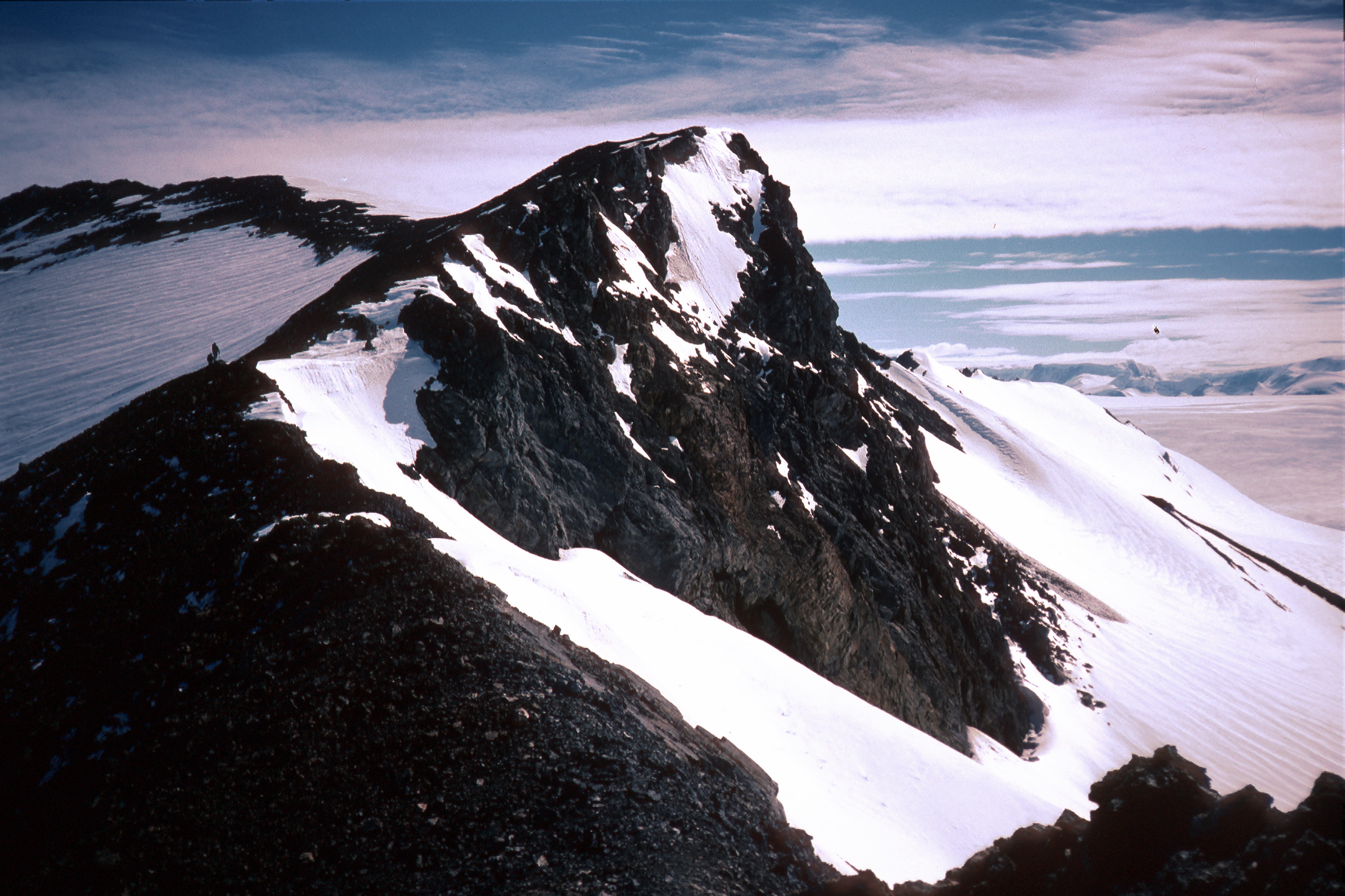
Phoenix Peak granite dyke

Features and nearby features, from north to south, include:

=== Ferguson Ridge ===
64°23′S 59°48′W. A ridge trending north-northwest – south-southeast and rising to 855 metres (2,805 ft) high southwest of Nodwell Peaks. Named in 1983 by the UK-APC after Harry Ferguson (1884-1960), British pioneer of tractor design from 1911 onward.

=== Skidoo Nunatak ===
64°23′S 59°45′W. A nunatak rising to 935 metres (3,068 ft) high, 1.3 nautical miles (2.4 km; 1.5 mi) south-southeast of Nodwell Peaks. Named by UK-APC following geological work by the British Antarctic Survey (BAS), 1978–79, and in association with the names of pioneers of overland mechanical transport grouped in this area. Named after the Bombardier Inc. Ski-Doo snowmobile used extensively by BAS since 1976.

=== Muskeg Gap ===
64°23′S 59°39′W. A low isthmus at the north end of Sobral Peninsula. The gap provides a coastal route which avoids a long detour around Sobral Peninsula Mapped from surveys by FIDS (1960–61). Named by UK-APC after the Canadian "Muskeg|tractor.

=== Phoenix Peak ===
64°24′S 59°39′W. A peak immediately south of Muskeg Gap at the north end of Sobral Peninsula. Mapped from surveys by FIDS (1960-61). Named by UK-APC after the Phoenix Manufacturing Company of Eau Claire, Wisconsin, which started in 1906-07 to design and build steam "locomotive sleds" for hauling logs over ice and snow, probably the earliest successful vehicles of their type.

=== Fishhook Ridge ===
64°27′S 59°36′W. A ridge rising to about 100 metres (330 ft) high on the east side of Sobral Peninsula. So named by UK-APC in 1990 from the shape of the feature in plan view.

=== Farquharson Nunatak ===
64°30′S 59°42′W. A nunatak 1.3 nautical miles (2.4 km; 1.5 mi) northwest of Mount Lombard. Named by the UK-APC after Geoffrey W. Farquharson, BAS geologist who worked in this area in the 1979–80 and 1980-81 field seasons.

=== Mount Lombard ===
64°31′S 59°38′W. The highest peak dominating the mountain mass whose south extremity is Cape Sobral. Mapped from surveys by the Falkland Islands Dependencies Survey (FIDS) (1960–61). Named by UK-APC for Alvin Orlando Lombard, American engineer of the Lombard Steam Log Hauler Co., Waterville, Maine, who designed some of the earliest successful off-rail steam ice locomotives, the first application of knowledge of off-rail winter mechanics to trafficability on hard pack or ice covered surfaces, 1901-13.

=== Hamer Hill ===
64°32′S 59°35′W. A hill (505 metres (1,657 ft) high) on the eastern edge of the central mountain mass of Sobral Peninsula. Named by the UK-APC for Richard D. Hamer, BAS geologist, Rothera Station, 1978–79 and 1980–81, who worked in the area.

=== Cape Sobral ===
64°33′S 59°34′W. High, mainly snow-covered elevation which surmounts the south end of Sobral Peninsula. Discovered by the Swedish Antarctic Expedition (SwedAE), 1901–04, under Otto Nordenskjöld, who named it for Lieutenant José M. Sobral of the Argentine Navy, assistant physicist and meteorologist with the expedition.

== Sources ==
- Alberts, Fred G., ed. (1995), Geographic Names of the Antarctic (PDF) (2 ed.), United States Board on Geographic Names This article incorporates public domain material from websites or documents of the United States Board on Geographic Names.
- Graham Land and South Shetland Islands, BAS: British Antarctic Survey, 2005
