= Sjögren Glacier =

Antarctic glacier

- Location within Antarctica
- Location: Trinity Peninsula
- Coordinates: 64°14′S 59°0′W
- Length: 12 nmi (22 km; 14 mi)
- Terminus: Prince Gustav Channel

Sjögren Glacier (64°14′S 59°0′W) is a glacier 15 nautical miles (28 km; 17 mi) long in the south part of Trinity Peninsula, Antarctica. It flows southeast from Detroit Plateau to the south side of Mount Wild, where it enters Prince Gustav Channel.

== Location ==
Trinity Peninsula, Antarctic Peninsula. Louis Philippe Plateau towards the southwest

The Sjögren Glacier is in Graham Land towards the southwest of the Trinity Peninsula, which forms the tip of the Antarctic Peninsula. It flows southeast from the Detroit Plateau to enter Prince Gustav Channel opposite Röhss Bay on James Ross Island. It is north of Mount Tucker and Longing Peninsula, and northeast of Larsen Inlet. Mount Hornsby looks over its western side.

- Copernix satellite image

== Glaciology ==
The Prince Gustaf Channel was filled by an ice shelf until the late 1980s. Its main sources were the Sjögren Glacier and the Röhss Glacier, which flows from James Ross Island. The ice shelf began to gradually retreat in the late 1980s, and collapsed in January 1995. In the period before the collapse the ice shelf contained many rifts, crevasses and melt ponds. After the collapse the Röhss Glacier rapidly retreated by about 15 kilometres (9.3 mi) between January 2001 and March 2009, and lost more than 70% of its area. Between 1996 and 2014 the glaciers flowing into Sjögren Inlet retreated by about 62 kilometres (39 mi). The rate of flow accelerated until 2007 in the Sjögren Glacier, and until 2004 in the Boydell Glacier. As of 2014 the rate of flow was still about twice the rate in 1996.

== Discovery and name ==
Sjögren Glacier was discovered in 1903 by the Swedish Antarctic Expedition (SwedAE) under Otto Nordenskjöld. He named it Hj. Sjögren Fiord after a patron of the expedition. The true nature of the feature was determined by the Falkland Islands Dependencies Survey (FIDS) in 1945.

== Western features ==
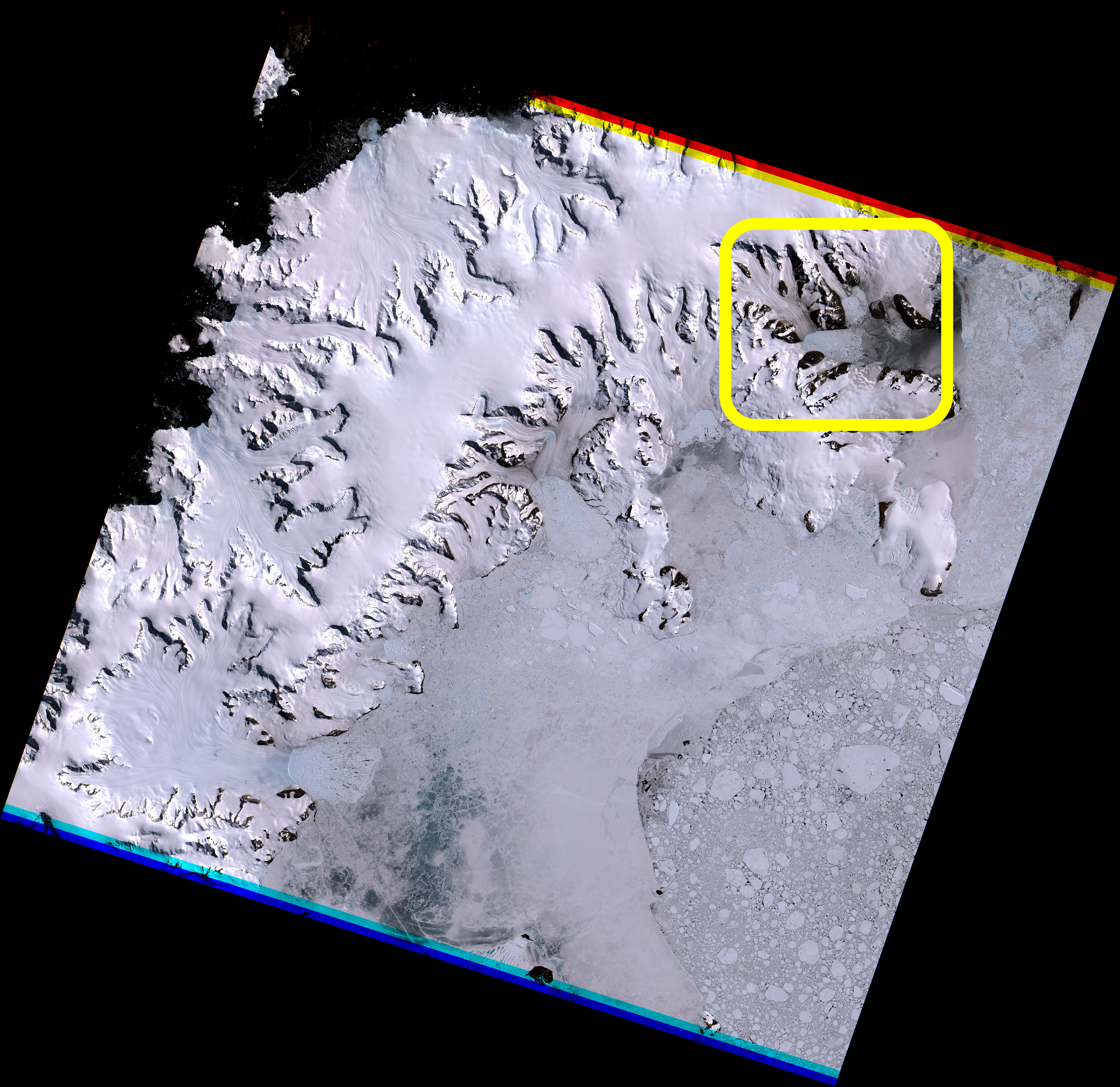
Sjögren Glacier to the east of the Detroit Plateau

=== Seydol Crag ===
64°07′03″S 59°18′21″W A narrow, rocky ridge extending 2.9 kilometres (1.8 mi) and rising to 1,070 metres (3,510 ft) high in the southeast foothills of Detroit Plateau. Situated 8.34 kilometres (5.18 mi) west-southwest of Lobosh Peak, 7.22 kilometres (4.49 mi) northwest of Mureno Peak and 8.94 kilometres (5.56 mi) north-northeast of Mount Hornsby. Surmounting the upper course of Sjögren Glacier to the west and south. Named after the settlement of Seydol in Northeastern Bulgaria.

=== Survakari Nunatak ===
64°09′40″S 59°14′45″W A rocky hill rising to 849 metres (2,785 ft) high in the southeast foothills of Detroit Plateau. Situated in upper Sjögren Glacier, 5.66 kilometres (3.52 mi) south-southeast of Seydol Crag and 6.29 kilometres (3.91 mi) northeast of Mount Hornsby. Named after the Bulgarian New Year's folkloric ritual of Survakari

=== Mount Hornsby ===
64°14′S 59°15′W. A prominent snow-capped mountain on the south side of the middle reaches of Sjögren Glacier. Mapped from surveys by FIDS (1960–61). Named by UK-APC after Richard Hornsby and Sons of Grantham, who designed and constructed several highly successful chain-track vehicles for the British War Office, the first "caterpillar tractors,|1904-10.

=== Draka Nunatak ===
64°15′06″S 59°10′06″W. A lens-shaped rocky ridge extending 4.2 kilometres (2.6 mi) and 1.9 kilometres (1.2 mi) wide, with twin heights rising to 889 metres (2,917 ft) on the southwest coast of Sjögren Inlet. Situated 6.32 kilometres (3.93 mi) south-southwest of Vetrovala Peak and 10.74 kilometres (6.67 mi) southeast of Mount Hornsby. Named after the settlements of Draka and Drakata in Southeastern and Southwestern Bulgaria respectively.

== Eastern features ==
=== Boydell Glacier ===
64°11′S 59°04′W. A glacier about 9 nautical miles (17 km; 10 mi) long, flowing southeast from the Detroit Plateau, Graham Land, and merging on the south side with Sjögren Glacier. Mapped by the Falkland Islands Dependencies Survey (FIDS) from surveys (1960–61). Named by the UK Antarctic Place-Names Committee (UK-APC) for James Boydell, English inventor of a steam traction engine, the first practical track-laying vehicle (British Patents of 1846 and 1854).

=== Lobosh Peak ===
64°06′00″S 59°08′21″W An ice-covered peak rising to 1,188 metres (3,898 ft) in the southeast foothills of Detroit Plateau. Situated east of the upper course of Boydell Glacier, 7.11 kilometres (4.42 mi) west by south of Petkov Nunatak, 3.12 kilometres (1.94 mi) northwest of the summit of Kopito Ridge, 5.18 kilometres (3.22 mi) north-northeast of Mureno Peak. Precipitous, mostly ice-free west slopes. Surmounting Boydell Glacier to the west and south. Named after the settlement of Lobosh in Western Bulgaria.

=== Mureno Peak ===
64°08′40″S 59°10′15″W. A rocky, mostly ice-free peak rising to 1,275 metres (4,183 ft) high in the north part of Aldomir Ridge. Situated between Sjögren and Boydell Glaciers, 5.18 kilometres (3.22 mi) south-southwest of Lobosh Peak, 16.9 kilometres (10.5 mi) northwest of Mount Wild, 7.15 kilometres (4.44 mi) north-northwest of Vetrovala Peak, 11.94 kilometres (7.42 mi) north of Draka Nunatak, 10.34 kilometres (6.42 mi) northeast of Mount Hornsby and 7.22 kilometres (4.49 mi) southeast of Seydol Crag. British mapping in 1983. Named after the settlement of Mureno in Western Bulgaria.

=== Aldomir Ridge ===
64°09′35″S 59°08′10″W. A mostly ice-free ridge on southern Trinity Peninsula bounded by Sjögren Glacier to the west and Boydell Glacier to the east. Extending 14 kilometres (8.7 mi) between Detroit Plateau to the north-northwest and Sjögren Inlet to the south-southeast, 4.2 kilometres (2.6 mi) wide and rising to 1,445 metres (4,741 ft) high at its north extremity. Named after the settlement of Aldomirovtsi in Western Bulgaria.

=== Mount Wild ===
64°12′S 58°53′W. Sharply defined rock ridge with several summits, the highest 945 metres (3,100 ft) high, standing at the north side of the mouth of Sjogren Glacier. First charted by the FIDS in 1945 and named for Frank Wild.

== Central features ==
=== Mount Daynes ===
64°12′12″S 59°06′35″W. Also known as Vetrovala Peak (Bulgarian). Locally prominent peak rising to 983 metres (3,225 ft) high at the south-eastern end of the promontory between Boydell and Sjögren glaciers. Named for Roger Daynes (b.1942), meteorologist and BC at Halley 1971–73. Co-founder, owner and Director of Snowsled Ltd 2000–16, manufacturers of Nansen sledges and pyramid tents for BAS since 1988 and designers and suppliers of polar equipment to many national polar research programmes and expeditions.

=== Royak Point ===
64°12′49″S 59°03′36″W. A rocky point on the northwest coast of Sjögren Inlet in southern Trinity Peninsula formed by the southeast extremity of Aldomir Ridge. Situated 2.6 kilometres (1.6 mi) southeast of Vetrovala Peak, 12.2 kilometres (7.6 mi) west of the headland formed by Mount Wild, and 16.25 kilometres (10.10 mi) northwest of the south side of the entrance to Sjögren Inlet. Formed as a result of the retreat of Sjögren Glacier and Boydell Glacier in the first decade of 21st century. Antarctic Digital Database mapping 2012. Named after the settlement of Royak in Northeastern Bulgaria.

=== Sjögren Inlet ===
64.2333333°S 59°W An inlet exposed following the retreat of Sjögren Glacier, approximately 9 nautical miles (17 km; 10 mi) long running east-southeast from the base of Sjögren Glacier, into Prince Gustav Channel, north of Longing Peninsula. Named by UK Antarctic Place-names Committee (UK-APC) (2006) in association with Sjögren Glacier.

=== Sjögren Glacier Tongue ===
64°14′S 58°38′W. A tongue of ice between 5 and 7 nautical miles (9.3 and 13.0 km; 5.8 and 8.1 mi) {{coord|wide, extending 15 nautical miles (28 km; 17 mi) {{coord|from Sjögren Glacier across Prince Gustav Channel toward Persson Island. It was mapped from surveys by the Falkland Islands Dependencies Survey (FIDS) (1960–61). The glacier tongue was an extension of the flow of Sjögren Glacier from which it took its name. It has disappeared since at least 1994, with its area now covered by the Prince Gustav Channel.

== Southern features ==
=== Hazarbasanov Ridge ===
64°13′07″S 59°16′35″W. A mostly ice-free ridge 5.5 kilometres (3.4 mi) long, 2.4 kilometres (1.5 mi) wide and rising to 1,022 metres (3,353 ft) high on the southwest side of Sjögren Glacier. Situated 4.34 kilometres (2.70 mi) southeast of Mount Hornsby, 6.57 kilometres (4.08 mi) south of Survakari Nunatak, 8.51 kilometres (5.29 mi) west-southwest of Vetrovala Peak. Named after Dobri Hazarbasanov (b. 1960), physician at St. Kliment Ohridski Base during the 1995/96 and subsequent seasons.

=== Shortcut Col ===
64°16′S 59°13′W. A wide col rising to over 460 metres (1,510 ft) immediately south of Mount Hornsby. Mapped from surveys by FIDS (1960–61). So named by UK-APC because this col provides a useful shortcut, avoiding the long detour through Longing Gap.

=== Downham Peak ===
64°17′S 58°54′W. A rock pyramid at the south side of the mouth of Sjögren Glacier. Mapped from surveys by FIDS (1960–61). Named by UK-APC for Noel Y. Downham, FIDS meteorological assistant at Hope Bay, who assisted in the triangulation of this area in 1961.

== Sources ==
- Alberts, Fred G., ed. (1995), Geographic Names of the Antarctic (PDF) (2 ed.), United States Board on Geographic Names This article incorporates public domain material from websites or documents of the United States Board on Geographic Names.
- "Aldomir Ridge", Composite Gazetteer of Antarctica, Scientific Committee on Antarctic Research

REMA Explorer
The Reference Elevation Model of Antarctica (REMA) gives ice surface measurements of most of the continent. When a feature is ice-covered, the ice surface will differ from the underlying rock surface and will change over time. To see ice surface contours and elevation of a feature as of the last REMA update,
- Open the Antarctic REMA Explorer
- Enter the feature's coordinates in the box at the top left that says "Find address or place", then press enter
  The coordinates should be in DMS format, e.g. 65°05'03"S 64°01'02"W. If you only have degrees and minutes, you may not be able to locate the feature.
- Hover over the icons at the left of the screen
- Find "Hillshade" and click on that
  In the bottom right of the screen, set "Shading Factor" to 0 to get a clearer image
- Find "Contour" and click on that
  In the "Contour properties" box, select Contour Interval = 1m
  You can zoom in and out to see the ice surface contours of the feature and nearby features
- Find "Identify" and click on that
  Click the point where the contour lines seem to indicate the top of the feature
  The "Identify" box will appear to the top left. The Orthometric height is the elevation of the ice surface of the feature at this point.

- Antarctic REMA Explorer (Digital Elevation Models created by the Polar Geospatial Center from Maxar imagery), Polar Geospatial Center. University of Minnesota, 2019
- "Draka Nunatak", Composite Gazetteer of Antarctica, Scientific Committee on Antarctic Research
- Glasser, N.F.; Scambos, T.A.; Bohlander, J.; Truffer, M.; Pettit, E.; Davies, B.J. (2011), "From Ice-Shelf Tributary to Tidewater Glacier: Continued Rapid Recession, Acceleration and Thinning of Röhss Glacier Following the 1995 Collapse of the Prince Gustav Ice Shelf, Antarctic Peninsula", Journal of Glaciology, 57 (203): 397–406, doi:10.3189/002214311796905578
- Graham Land and South Shetland Islands, BAS: British Antarctic Survey, 2005
- "Hazarbasanov Ridge", Composite Gazetteer of Antarctica, Scientific Committee on Antarctic Research
- "Lobosh Peak", Composite Gazetteer of Antarctica, Scientific Committee on Antarctic Research
- "Mount Daynes", Composite Gazetteer of Antarctica, Scientific Committee on Antarctic Research
- "Mureno Peak", Composite Gazetteer of Antarctica, Scientific Committee on Antarctic Research
- "Royak Point", Composite Gazetteer of Antarctica, Scientific Committee on Antarctic Research
- Seehaus, Thorsten; Marinsek, Sebastián; Skvarca, Pedro; van Wessem, Jan Melchior; Reijmer, Carleen H.; Seco, José; Braun, Matthias (2016), "Dynamic response of Sjögren Inlet glaciers, Antarctic Peninsula, to ice shelf breakup derived from multi-mission remote sensing time series", Frontiers in Earth Science, 4 (66), doi:10.3389/feart.2016.00066
- "Seydol Crag", Composite Gazetteer of Antarctica, Scientific Committee on Antarctic Research
- "Sjögren Inlet", Geographic Names Information System, United States Geological Survey, United States Department of the Interior
- "Survakari Nunatak", Composite Gazetteer of Antarctica, Scientific Committee on Antarctic Research
- "Vetrovala Peak", Composite Gazetteer of Antarctica, Scientific Committee on Antarctic Research

This article incorporates public domain material from websites or documents of the United States Geological Survey.
