= Florentino Ameghino Refuge =

- Refuge
- Location within Antarctica
- Coordinates: 64°25′S 58°57′W
- Country: Argentina
- Location in Antarctic Peninsula: Cape Longing; Graham Land; Antarctica
- Administered by: Argentine Army
- Established: 1960
- Named after: Florentino Ameghino
- Type: Seasonal
- Status: Closed

Florentino Ameghino Refuge (64°25′S 58°57′W) is an Antarctic refuge located on Cape Longing in the Trinity Peninsula, at the northern tip of the Antarctic Peninsula.

== Structure and site ==
The wooden hut, 2.2 metres (7 ft 3 in) high and 2 by 2 metres (6 ft 7 in by 6 ft 7 in) square, was built on 15 October 1960. The ice-free site had long been used as a depot site. It is at an altitude of 29 metres (95 ft) above sea level on Cape Longing, the southeastern tip of a peninsula that extends from the Nordenskjöld Coast on the east of the Antarctic Peninsula.

== Name ==
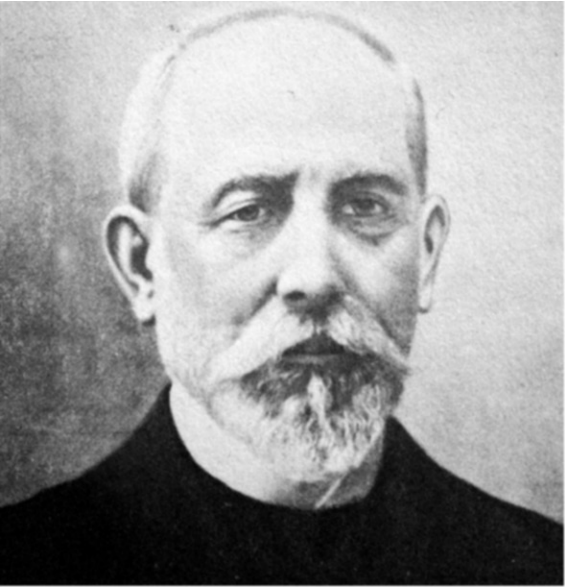
Florentino Ameghino

The nearby Ameghino Gully is named for the Refugio Ameghino, which in turn is named after Florentino Ameghino (1854–1911), Argentine geologist and anthropologist; Director, Museum of Natural History, Buenos Aires, 1902–11.

== Administration ==
The Florentino Ameghino depot is the responsibility of the Argentine Army's Antarctic Department. It is one of the 18 shelters that are under the responsibility of the Esperanza Base, which is responsible for the maintenance and the care tasks. The National Antarctic Directorate reports that the refuge is inactive.

== Sources ==
- "Ameghino Gully", Composite Gazetteer of Antarctica, Scientific Committee on Antarctic Research
- Dubrovin, L.I.; Petrov, V.N. (1971), Scientific Stations in Antarctia 1882-1963 (PDF), National Science Foundation, Polar Information Service
- Intercambio de información 3.2.1. ESTACIONES D. REFUGIOS., Dirección Nacional del Antártico, archived from the original on 2013-05-17
- "Longing Gap", Composite Gazetteer of Antarctica, Scientific Committee on Antarctic Research
