= Derzelas =

Chthonic deity in Dacian or Thracian religion

- Great God of Odessos; God of abundance, the underworld, health, and human spirit's vitality
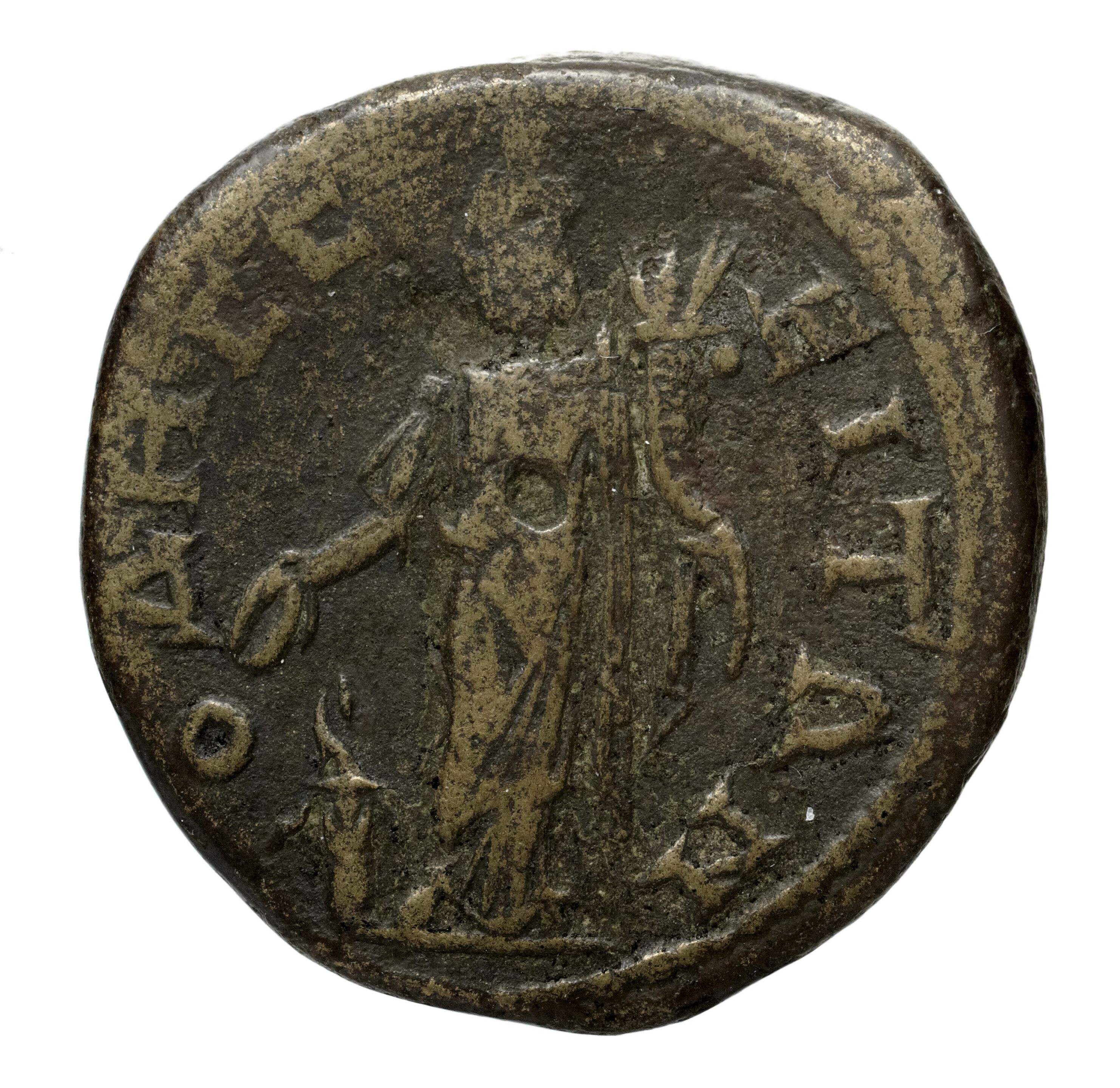
- A coin depicting the Great God of Odessos holding a patera over an altar in his right hand and a cornucopia in his left
- Venerated in: Odessos

Equivalents
- Greek: Dionysus in Orphism
- Roman: Pluto
- Graeco-Egyptian: Sarapis

Derzelas, also called Darzelas and Derzis, was a Dacian or Thracian chthonic god of abundance, the underworld, health, and human spirit's vitality. Derzelas was associated with the Roman Pluto, the Orphic interpretation of Dionysus, the Graeco-Egyptian Sarapis, and was one of the many gods associated with the Thracian Horseman.

During Roman rule of Dacia, Derzelas became associated with the Great God of Odessos (modern Varna), and thus was called Theos Megas Darzalas (the Great God Derzalas). However, his worship never fully replaced the earlier dominant cult of Apollo in Odessos.

Derzalas was also referred to as theō epēkoō Derzei (the god who listens to prayers).

There was a temple dedicated to him with a cult statue, and games (Darzaleia) were held in his honor every five years, possibly attended by Gordian III in 238 CE.

Another temple dedicated to Derzelas was built at Histria - a Greek colony on the shore of the Black Sea in the third century BC.

Darzalas Peak on Trinity Peninsula in Antarctica is named after the god.

== Origins ==
There is debate among scholars whether Derzelas was an indigenous Thracian god, if he had Greek origins, or if he was the result of religious syncretism. The name Darzalas itself is of Thracian origin, while Theos Megas is a Roman term, usually given to Pluto.

== Depiction in Coinage ==
Derzalas was frequently depicted on the coinage of Hellenistic period Odessos from the third century BCE to the third century CE and portrayed in numerous terracotta figurines, as well as in a rare 4th century BC lead one found in the city. He was also depicted on the coinage of Tomis (modern day Constanța).

Derzalas was depicted on the reverse side of coinage for Roman Empires such as Caracalla, Septimus Severus, Elagabalus, Severus Alexander, and Gordan III. He was also sometimes depicted on the obverse of coins, with the Thracian Horseman on the reverse, on either side as the central figure of a triad, between Heracles and Athena, and on the reverse of coins, with Heracles on the obverse. In Tomis coinage, Derzelas was also sometimes shown with an eagle between Castor and Pollux.

Derzalas was often depicted in himation, holding cornucopiae with altars by his side.

From 281-250 BCE, Derzelas was featured on three out of four of Odessos' countermarks.

== Association with the Thracian Horseman ==
One relief, estimated to be from the 1st - 3rd centuries BCE, discovered in Metodievo, depicts the Thracian Horseman refers to the Horseman as Derzis, who the Roman creator (Aelius Diogenes) is making an offering to.

Some scholars believe that the Thracian Horseman's association with Derzalas gave him a role as a guide for souls in the underworld.
