= Blaquier =

- Town
- Location within Buenos Aires Province
- Coordinates: 34°38′S 62°29′W
- Country: Argentina
- Province: Buenos Aires
- Partidos: Florentino Ameghino
- Established: December 5, 1905
- Elevation: 92 m (302 ft)

Population (2001 Census)
  - Total: 676
- Time zone: UTC−3 (ART)
- CPA Base: B 6065
- Climate: Dfc

Blaquier is a town located in the Florentino Ameghino Partido in the province of Buenos Aires, Argentina. It is located near the border between Buenos Aires and the province of Santa Fe.

== Geography ==
Blaquier is located 450 km (280 mi) from the city of Buenos Aires.

== History ==
Blaquier was founded on December 5, 1905, on land donated by Alberto Blaquier, who donated the land that would become the town for the construction of a railway station. The town was surveyed a year later.

In 2024, six people died in a pumping station in Blaquier after inhaling toxic gases within the pump at the station. The event was caused by one man attempting to fix the pump getting stuck, leading to an unsuccessful rescue attempt by the five others.

== Population ==
According to INDEC, which collects population data for the country, the town had a population of 676 people as of the 2001 census.
