= Bruce Nodwell =

Canadian inventor

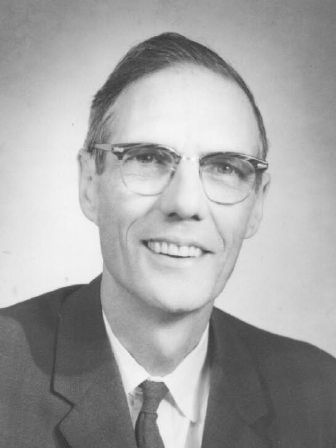
- Born: May 12, 1914; Asquith, Saskatchewan
- Died: January 20, 2006 (aged 91); Calgary, Alberta
- Occupation: inventor
- Awards: Order of Canada

Bruce Nodwell, OC (May 12, 1914 – January 20, 2006) was a Canadian inventor who invented the Nodwell 110, a multi-purpose two-tracked vehicle capable of traversing a wide variety of adverse terrain, including sand, mud, muskeg, swamp, and snow.

In 1970, he was made an Officer of the Order of Canada, Canada's highest civilian honor, "for his contribution to the opening of the Canadian North through his inventions and development of various types of tracked vehicles". A mountain in Antarctica "Nodwell Peaks" and a lake in NWT bear his name.

== Early life ==
William Bruce Nodwell was born on his father's homestead near Asquith, Saskatchewan, May 12, 1914. His unusual birth certificate read Section 22, Township 36, Range 9 west 3rd. As a youngster, his family lived in many small western Canadian towns, as his father was a grain elevator operator and trainer. They returned to Asquith, where his father ran a hardware store and later a Dodge car dealership in North Battleford. During this time, Bruce learned hands-on carpentry, electrical and mechanical machinery operations. Although he only took Grade 8 in school, he studied electrical apprenticeship by correspondence and became Saskatchewan's youngest registered electrician.

However, this was the time of the Great Depression in western Canada. Crops were drying out, prices for grain were low, farmers were being forced off the land, businesses were failing and there were next to no jobs. Bruce started doing odd jobs using his practical skills and hard work. He ran a two or three person contracting operation that took work wherever they could find it, which included all of southern Saskatchewan and Alberta. In 1936, he and his wife Phyllis settled in Calgary, Alberta where he and his brother, Jack, formed a contracting company known as Nodwell Brothers.

During the Depression and WWII years, not only were jobs hard to find, but so were materials. The government imposed a cost ceiling of $10,000 on all new buildings. This also applied to service stations, which made it very difficult to construct a building big enough to repair trucks and tractors or car dealerships. In order to construct a new building, another would have to be taken down, just to obtain nails, which then had to be straightened by hand.

== Inventive genius ==
Bruce's inventiveness and problem solving skills soon became apparent. He developed and patented an automatic rewinding mechanism for gasoline pumps (CA 454365) and a pipe-wrapping machine for coating pipelines with tar paper in the field. Many problems related to construction work were solved by adapting other available equipment. Gradually the company continued to grow and diversify its activities including concrete bridges, trucking fleet, industrial camps and a machine shop known as Industrial Fabricators.

Over the years, Bruce filed nine patents in Canada.

== Development of early tracked vehicles ==
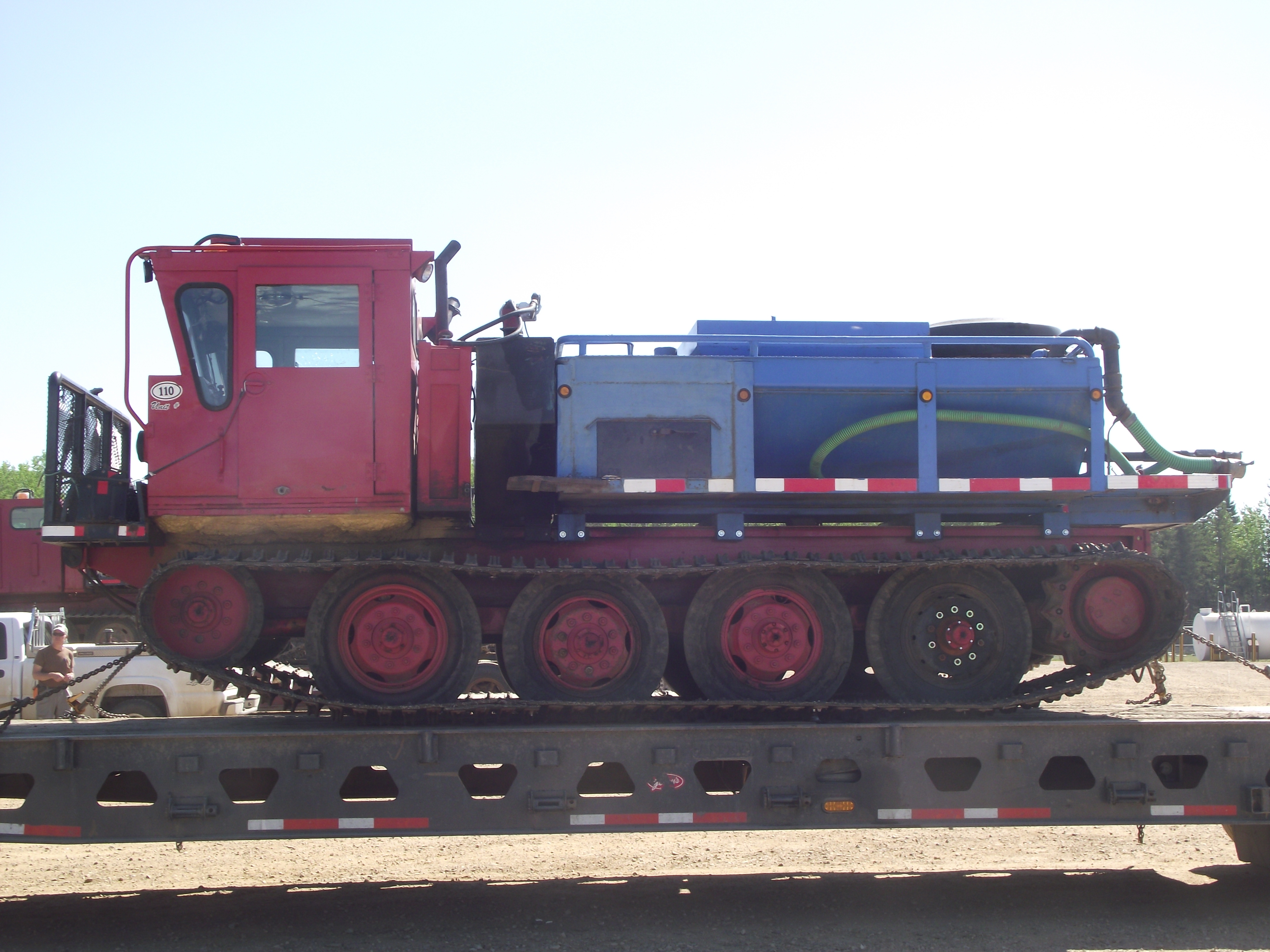
A Nodwell 110 equipped with a water tank for fire suppression

In 1947, Imperial Oil made the Leduc No. 1 discovery in Alberta, and the economy began to rapidly expand. As the oil exploration moved northward from the Leduc region, the oil men soon encountered muskeg, a wet boggy swamp-like matter through which conventional equipment could not pass. Even WWII tracked equipment either could not handle the requirement or did not have sufficient load capacities.

Imperial Oil asked Bruce Nodwell to construct two vehicles they had designed to try to provide mobility over muskeg. These vehicles were unsuccessful, but Bruce had become aware of the need for large tracked vehicles. His first designs, that were to be either tracked or wheeled, were called North Kings and 16 were sold, but even they did not have enough mobility or durability. Bruce then concentrated on a vehicle design using soft tracks and single rows of wheels to support them.

In 1955, Bruce's invention of the double sprocket made it possible to drive wide tracks and also keep them in place while using a single row of wheels. The combination of the splice in the belt and the double sprocket allowed the use of any size or shape belt the vehicles needed. The "wide track" concept was born. They were now able to build a new and different type of machine. The first of these was a small 1-ton-capacity vehicle called the Scout Car. However, the oil industry need a larger capacity in order to transport the geophysical "seismic" drilling rigs. Bruce's next step was to build a tracked trailer, since a method of steering a large vehicle had yet to be located. The powered trailer had tracks 40 inches wide, its own engine, and could carry a five-ton load through muskeg. Although it had its own power, it was navigated by the smaller Scout Car, which was attached to its front hitch. Imperial Oil, responding to this breakthrough in muskeg vehicles, bought 30 powered tracked trailers and 30 Scout Cars.

The company, Bruce Nodwell Ltd., then began working on designing improvements to the powered trailer so that it would be a self-sufficient unit. The successful trailer was to be modified to include a cab and a steering differential device to make it into a self operating vehicle. Eventually, after a few unsuccessful attempts at finding or building a steering mechanism, the problem was solved by modifying an Oliver Tractor steering differential. The new vehicle was first called the Tracked Truck. However, everyone in the industry knew Bruce, because of his close contact with existing and potential customers, so they called the vehicle the "Nodwell". Later, the vehicle became known as the Nodwell 110, indicating its payload in 100-pound units.

Even though the Model 110 was now proving to be a more successful operating unit, the Canadian marketplace was reluctant to purchase many Nodwell vehicles due to memories of past failures. For a while it became necessary for the company to try another market, making their first major sale to Western Geophysical in Alaska. This sale consisted of a complete geophysical crew, including five drill carriers, two recorders, a mechanics shop, kitchen unit and crew quarters, all mounted on the Model 110 vehicles. This crew operated successfully in severe muskeg conditions, spreading the reputation of the Model 110 throughout the geophysical industry both in Canada and Alaska.

This model became the standard for geophysical work in the muskeg country of Northern Canada and Alaska. The Nodwell 110 was ultimately so successful that over 1,500 vehicles of this style were manufactured by the industry. Several Nodwell vehicles were delivered to the US Antarctic Research Organization and in 1961 a Place-Name survey group named a mountain in the Antarctic Peninsula Nodwell Peaks.

== Diversification of products and worldwide markets ==
As Bruce expanded the applications and product line, additional financing was required and he used a number of different companies including, North King Equipment Ltd., Bruce Nodwell Ltd. and in 1958, Robin-Nodwell Ltd. Bruce left Robin-Nodwell in 1965 to join his son, Jack Nodwell, in a new company, Foremost Industries. Foremost, over the years expanded the product lines to encompass both tracked and large-tired vehicles with load capacities from 5 to 70 tonnes. The company pursued international markets throughout the world, with its major success being in the USSR and Russia where over 700 vehicles with load capacities of 30 tonnes were delivered.

In 1976 Foremost Industries recovered the trade name "Nodwell" when its rival folded.

== Recognitions ==
In 1970, he was made an Officer of the Order of Canada, Canada's highest civilian honor, "for his contribution to the opening of the Canadian North through his inventions and development of various types of tracked vehicles".

A mountain in Antarctica "Nodwell Peaks" was named in recognition of the vehicles in use by the various Antarctica Research institutions.

A large lake in Canada's North West Territories is called Nodwell Lake (Lat 67.4539, Long -135.3115). During the early days of geophysical exploration in the north, the Nodwell vehicles were often sent out onto lakes once the ice was believed to be strong enough. The tracks in the snow would speed further freezing for other equipment. A Nodwell 110 fell through the ice of this lake and from then on it was known as Nodwell Lake. The crew was able to quickly exit out of the "Escape Hatch" on the roof that was standard equipment.

Canada Post issued a special stamp series in 1996 called Historic Land Vehicles. The Robin-Nodwell RN 110 is illustrated on an 88 cent stamp.
