= Paramun =

Paramun Парамун
- Village
- Location of Paramun
- Coordinates: 42°47′31″N 22°44′47″E
- Country: Bulgaria
- Provinces (Oblast): Pernik
- First mentioned: 1451

Government
  - Mayor: Stanislav Nikolov
- Elevation: 917 m (3,009 ft)

Population (2005)
  - Total: 56
- Time zone: UTC+2 (EET)
  - Summer (DST): UTC+3 (EEST)
- Postal Code: 2474
- Area code: 07733
- License plate: B

Paramun (Bulgarian: Парамун) is a village in Tran Municipality, Pernik Province. It is located in western Bulgaria, 66 km from the capital city of Sofia and 14 km from the town of Tran, near the Serbian border. The toponym is of Byzantine Greek origin, from the loanword paramun meaning "guard, watch, sentry". It was rendered as παραμονή in Greek and was retained in medieval Serbian as ПАРАМОУНЬ. The name was first mentioned in 1451 and 1453.
