= Florentino Ameghino =

Argentine naturalist, paleontologist, anthropologist and zoologist

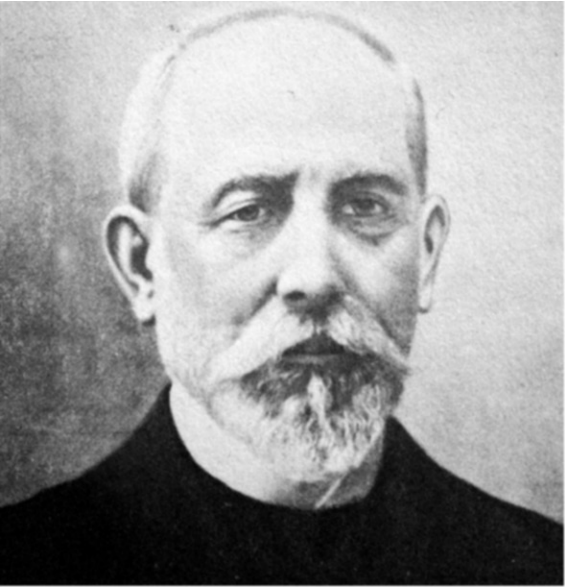
- Florentino Ameghino
- Born: Giovanni Battista Fiorino Giuseppe Ameghino; September 19, 1853; Moneglia, Kingdom of Sardinia
- Died: August 6, 1911 (aged 56); La Plata, Argentina
- Resting place: La Plata Cemetery
- Awards: Bronze medal at the Exposition Universelle (1889) for Mammalian Fossils in the Argentine Republic.
- Scientific career
- Fields: Paleontology

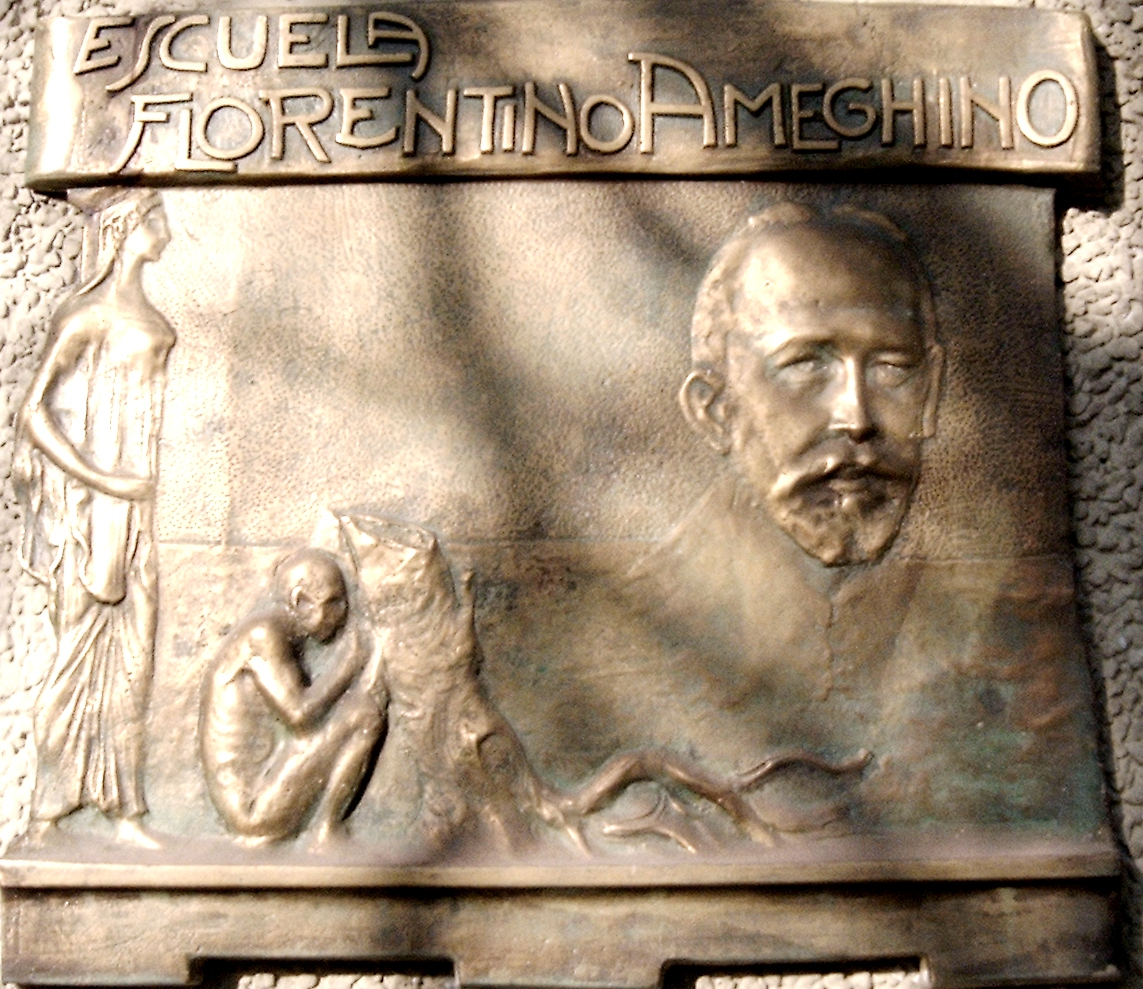
Homage to Florentino Ameghino, by the sculptor Erminio Blotta

Florentino Ameghino (born Giovanni Battista Fiorino Giuseppe Ameghino; September 19, 1853 – August 6, 1911) was an Argentine naturalist, paleontologist, anthropologist and zoologist, whose fossil discoveries on the Argentine Pampas, especially on Patagonia, rank with those made in the western United States during the late 19th century. Along with his two brothers – Carlos and Juan – Florentino Ameghino was one of the most important founding figures in South American paleontology.

From 1887 until his death, Ameghino was passionately devoted to the study of fossil mammals from Patagonia, with the valuable support of his brother Carlos Ameghino (1865–1936) who, between 1887 and 1902, made 14 trips to that region, where he discovered and collected numerous fossil faunas and made important stratigraphic observations.

== Biography ==
Ameghino was born on September 19, 1853, in Tessi, an hamlet of Moneglia, a municipality of Liguria in Italy, in what was then the Kingdom of Sardinia and moved to Argentina with his parents when he was 18 months old. Ameghino was a self-taught naturalist, and focused his study on the lands of the southern Pampas. He formed one of the largest collections of fossils of the world at the time, which served him as base for numerous geological and paleontological studies. Ameghino was a leading pioneer in the development of phylogenetics and of the paleontological approach of evolutionary biology. He also investigated the possible presence of prehistoric man in the Pampas and made several controversial claims about human origins in South America. Domingo Faustino Sarmiento, president of Argentina 1868–1874, described Ameghino as "a countryman from Mercedes that nobody knows of here, but that is admired by scholars worldwide."

The Antiquity of Man in the Río de la Plata, later translated into French, was published in 1878. Phylogeny, published in 1884, was a theoretical work on developing an evolutionary concept in the Lamarckian vein, and led to the establishment of zoological taxonomy as a discipline with mathematical foundations. He later directed the Department of Zoology at the National University of Córdoba, which awarded him with an honorary doctorate, and was inducted into the National Academy of Sciences of Argentina.

Ameghino worked with Francisco P. Moreno, founder and director of the La Plata Museum, as deputy director, secretary, and director of the Paleontology Department upon its establishment in 1888. Ameghino enriched his department with his own collection, which he sold to the provincial government for the purpose. But it was little time in which these two scientists worked together. A year later his magnum opus appeared in the Proceedings of the National Academy of Sciences, Mammalian Fossils in the Argentine Republic, comprising 1028 pages and an atlas. This latter contribution to the knowledge of the fossil mammals of Argentina won the bronze medal at the Exposition Universelle of 1889 in Paris.

He later served as director of the Bernardino Rivadavia Natural Sciences Museum, in Buenos Aires, and in 1906 published Sedimentary Formations of the Cretaceous and Tertiary Eras in Patagonia, a work of synthesis is not limited to descriptions, but it raises hypotheses about the evolution of various mammals and analyzes the different layers of the crust and their possible ages. Ameghino returned between 1907 and 1911 to his earlier dedication: anthropology, the descriptions of the first inhabitants, industries and cultures. He theorized about the coexistence between human beings and the extinct megafauna in the Pampas, including the possible origin of humans and subsequent evolution in America. As an autodidact, he studied the lands of the Pampa, collecting numerous fossils, on which he based himself to carry out numerous geology and paleontology investigations. He also investigated Quaternary man at the Chelles archaeological site.

Florentino Ameghino died in La Plata, at the age of 57, on August 6, 1911, after falling ill with diabetes and resisting surgery.

== Oeuvre ==
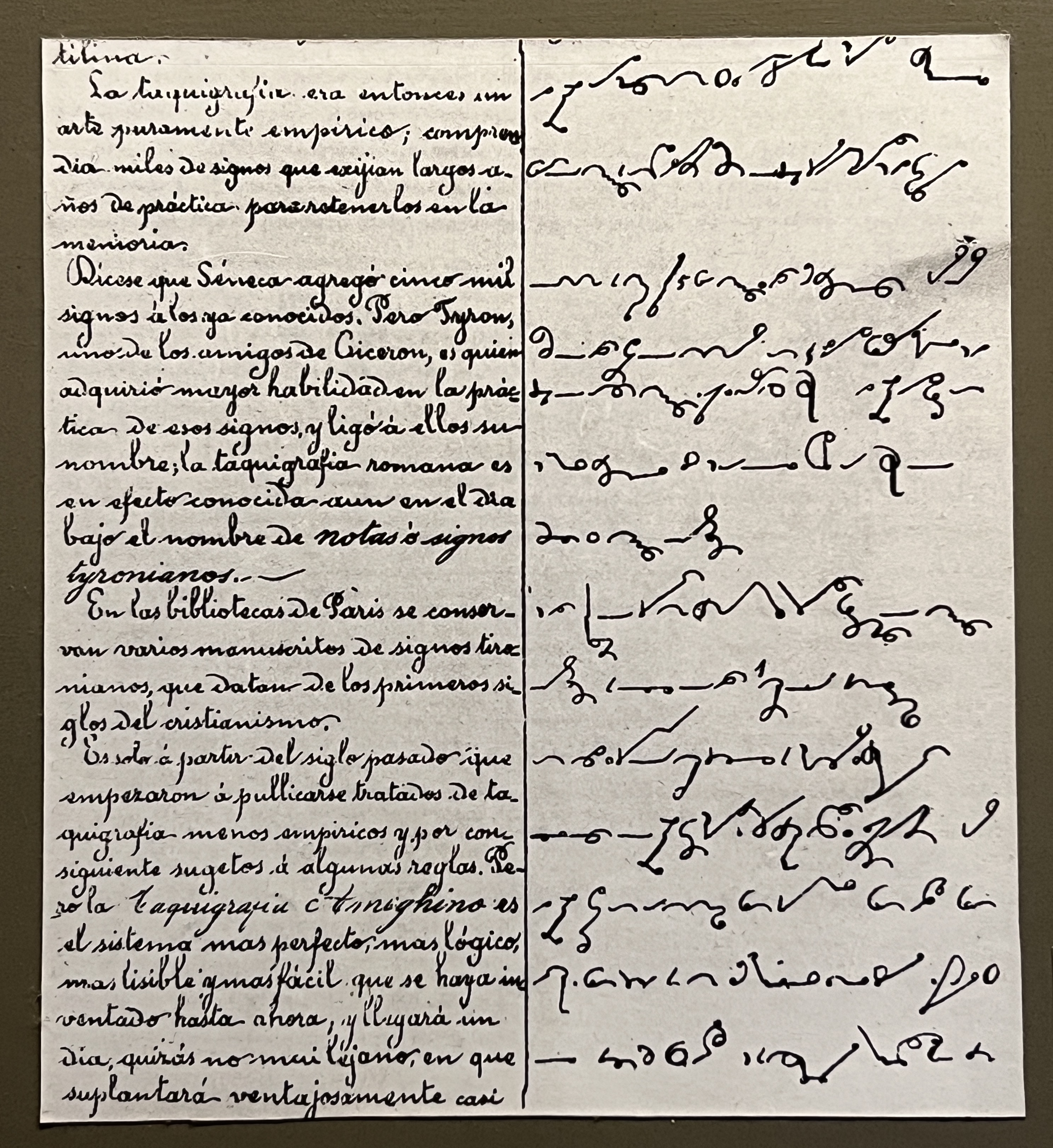
A new shorthand method proposed by Ameghino in 1880

His published works include 24 volumes of between 700 and 800 pages each, containing classifications, studies, comparisons and descriptions of more than 9000 extinct animals, many discovered by him. This was an important contribution to the known catalog of extinct mammals, and would, along with the Ameghino collection, be consulted by scientists from America and Europe in subsequent years. He died from the symptoms of diabetes in La Plata in 1911.

== Honors ==
The Ameghino Crater on the Moon is named in his honor. The Florentino Ameghino Partido and its county seat of Ameghino, situated in the north-west of Buenos Aires Province, are also named after him, as is the palaeontology journal Ameghiniana.

Several Argentine cities are named Florentino Ameghino as well as various educational institutions across the country, libraries and museums, squares, schools, parks and other locations. Among others, these include:

- The square Parque Florentino Ameghino, located in Buenos Aires
- The Florentino Ameghino Department, administrative division of the province of Chubut
- The judicial district Florentino Ameghino Partido, legal jurisdiction of the province of Buenos Aires; Florentino Ameghino, Buenos Aires, a city in the province of Buenos Aires
- Florentino Ameghino, a town in the province of Misiones
- The Florentino Ameghino Dam, forming an artificial lake in the province of Chubut
- The Villa Dique Florentino Ameghino, a small town in the province of Chubut
- Florentino Ameghino, a town in the province of Chubut; the petrified forest "Bosque Petrificado Florentino Ameghino" in the province of Chubut
- The "Colegio Nacional Florentino Ameghino", located in the city of Mercedes, Buenos Aires Province
- Ameghino Gully and Florentino Ameghino Refuge in Antarctica
- The municipal garden in the city of Miramar, Buenos Aires Province has the name "Vivero Dunícola Florentino Ameghino"
- A club from the city of Necochea in the province of Buenos Aires.

== Selected publications ==
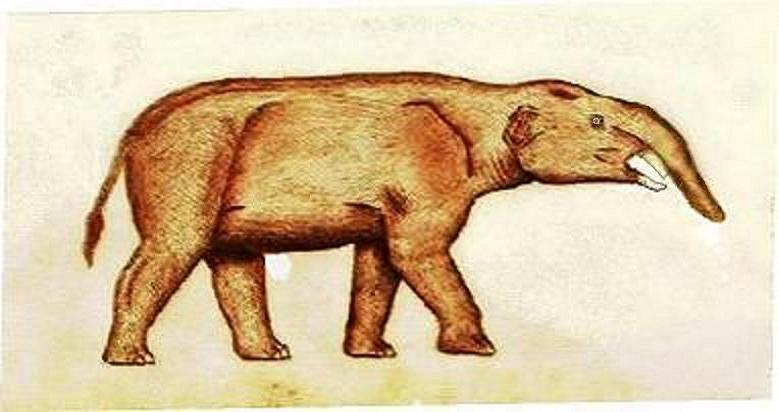
Pyrotherium romeroi or beast of fire named in honor of Argentine Army Captain Antonio Romero who sent a tusk, a premolar, and two molars to Ameghino. P. romeroi is a large extinct mammal whose fossil remains were described and classified by Ameghino. Its tusks and trunk evolved separately from the elephants — the species belonged to the xenungulata within the meridiungulata.

- "La Antigüedad del Hombre en el Plata". París, 1880 (2nd edition in 2 volumes, Editorial Intermundo, Buenos Aires, 1947)
- "Los monos fósiles de la República Argentina". 1891
- "Énumeration synoptique des espèces de mammifères fossiles des formations éocènes de Patagonie". 1894, in which 440 species are catalogued
- "Sur les oiseaux fossiles de la Patagonie". 1895
- "Las sequías e inundaciones en la provincia de Buenos Aires". online text
- "L'Âge des formations sédimentaires de Patagonie". 1900–1903
- "Línea filogenética de los proboscídeos". 1902
- "On the primitive type of the Plagiodont molars of Mammalia". 1902
- "Los Diprotodontes del orden de los plagiaulacoides y el origen de los roedores y de los Polimastodontes". 1903
- Paleontologia argentina. 1904
- "Recherches de morphologie phylogénétique sur les molaires supérieures des ongulés". 1904
