= Edgeworth Glacier =

Glacier in Antarctica

- Location within Antarctica
- Location: Graham Land, Antarctica
- Coordinates: 64°23′S 59°55′W
- Terminus: Prince Gustav Channel

The Edgeworth Glacier (64°23′S 59°55′W) is a glacier 12 nautical miles (22 km; 14 mi) long, flowing south-southwestwards from the edge of Detroit Plateau below Wolseley Buttress to the ice shelf west of Sobral Peninsula, Graham Land, Antarctica.

== Location ==
Nordenskjöld Coast, Antarctic Peninsula. Edgeworth Glacier towards east of south coast

Edgeworth Glacier is in Graham Land on the Nordenskjöld Coast of the eastern Antarctic Peninsula. It flows south from the Detroit Plateau, past the Sobral Peninsula to the east to enter the Weddell Sea.

== Mapping and name ==
The Edgeworth Glacier was mapped from surveys by the Falkland Islands Dependencies Survey (FIDS) in 1960–61, and was named by the UK Antarctic Place-Names Committee (UK-APC) for Richard Lovell Edgeworth, the British inventor of the "portable railway," the first track-laying vehicle, in 1770.

== Features ==
=== Bombardier Glacier ===
64°19′S 59°59′W. A glacier flowing southeast from the edge of Detroit Plateau, and through a deep trough to join Edgeworth Glacier. Mapped from surveys by FIDS (1960-61). Named by UK-APC for Joseph-Armand Bombardier, Canadian engineer who developed the "Snowmobile", one of the earliest successful over-snow vehicles (1926-37).

=== Kavlak Peak ===
64°23′26″S 60°12′32″W A peak rising to 1,160 metres (3,810 ft) high in the southeast foothills of Detroit Plateau. Situated in the west part of a narrow rocky ridge projecting 5 kilometres (3.1 mi) eastwards into the upper course of Dinsmoor Glacier, 7.17 kilometres (4.46 mi) west-southwest of Darzalas Peak and 6.92 kilometres (4.30 mi) northwest of Mount Elliott. Named after the settlement of Kavlak in Northern Bulgaria.

=== Darzalas Peak ===
64°21′41″S 60°04′35″W A rocky, mostly ice-free peak rising to 934 metres (3,064 ft) high in the southeast foothills of Detroit Plateau. Situated between Bombardier Glacier and Dinsmoor Glacier, 6.16 kilometres (3.83 mi) north of Mount Elliott and 7.17 kilometres (4.46 mi) east-northeast of Kavlak Peak. Named after the Thracian god Darzalas.

=== Mount Elliott ===
64°24′S 60°02′W. Conspicuous mountain, 1,265 metres (4,150 ft) high, with a few small rock exposures and ice-free cliffs on the southeast side, standing 16 nautical miles (30 km; 18 mi) northwest of Cape Sobral. Charted in 1947 by the FIDS and named for F.K. Elliott, leader of the FIDS base at Hope Bay in 1947 and 1948.

=== Dinsmoor Glacier ===
64°22′S 59°59′W. A glacier flowing east from the south edge of Detroit Plateau, Graham Land, joining Edgeworth Glacier to the northeast of Mount Elliott. Mapped from surveys by FIDS (1960-61). Named by UK-APC for Charles Dinsmoor of Warren, PA, who invented the "endless tracking machine," a forerunner of modern tracked vehicles, in 1886; first manufactured commercially by Holt Manufacturing Co. of Stockton, CA, in 1906.

=== Nodwell Peaks ===
64°18′S 59°47′W. Two outstanding peaks, less than 1 nautical mile (1.9 km; 1.2 mi) apart, on the east side of Edgeworth Glacier. Mapped from surveys by FIDS (1960-61). Named by UK-APC after Robin-Nodwell Mfg. Ltd. of Calgary, Canada, makers of Nodwell tracked carriers, used in Antarctica since 1960.

=== Paramun Buttress ===
64°13′39″S 59°52′44″W. An ice-covered buttress rising to 1,638 metres (5,374 ft) high on the southeast side of Detroit Plateau. Situated between tributaries to Edgeworth Glacier, 5.74 kilometres (3.57 mi) west-northwest of Kopriva Peak, 6.92 kilometres (4.30 mi) north-northeast of Trave Peak and 27.1 kilometres (16.8 mi) south of Volov Peak on Davis Coast. Steep and partly ice-free west, south and east slopes. Named after the settlement of Paramun in Western Bulgaria.

=== Trave Peak ===
64°17′15″S 59°54′59″W. A partly ice-covered peak rising to 983.5 metres (3,227 ft) high in the southeast foothills of Detroit Plateau. Situated 6.92 kilometres (4.30 mi) south-southwest of Paramun Buttress, 6.92 kilometres (4.30 mi) west by south of Chipev Nunatak and 11.28 kilometres (7.01 mi) northeast of Darzalas Peak. Precipitous and partly ice-free west and north slopes. Overlooking Edgeworth Glacier to the north, east and south. Named after the settlement of Trave in Southern Bulgaria.

=== Chipev Nunatak ===
64°16′34″S 59°46′33″W. A narrow, rocky hill extending 2.9 kilometres (1.8 mi) in north–south direction and rising to 850 metres (2,790 ft) high on the east side of Edgeworth Glacier. Situated 3.6 kilometres (2.2 mi) south of Kopriva Peak, 8.1 kilometres (5.0 mi) northwest of Dolen Peak, 692 kilometres (430 mi) east by north of Trave Peak and 7.36 kilometres (4.57 mi) southeast of Paramun Buttress. Named after Nesho Chipev (b. 1953), biologist at St. Kliment Ohridski base during the 1994/95 and subsequent seasons.

=== Rott Inlet ===
64°27′00″S 59°53′00″W. Also known as Mundraga Bay (Bulgaria), named on 16 February 2011 after the medieval fortress of Mundraga in Northeastern Bulgaria. A bay between Cape Sobral and Fothergill Point, east of the Detroit Plateau. The head of the bay is fed by Dinsmoor, Bombardier and Edgeworth glaciers. Named on 12 March 2012 after Professor Helmut Rott, glaciologist at the University of Innsbruck, for his work on the break up of the Larsen Ice Shelf.

=== Kopriva Peak ===
64°14′38″S 59°46′00″W. A rocky peak rising to 1,140 metres (3,740 ft) high at the south extremity of Wolseley Buttress on the southeast side of Detroit Plateau. Situated between Albone and Edgeworth Glaciers, 5.14 kilometres (3.19 mi) southwest of Bolgar Buttress, 10.38 kilometres (6.45 mi) northwest of Dolen Peak, 8.73 kilometres (5.42 mi) northeast of Trave Peak and 5.74 kilometres (3.57 mi) east-southeast of Paramun Buttress. Surmounting Albone Glacier to the east and Edgeworth Glacier to the W. Named after the settlement of Kopriva in Western Bulgaria.

== Sources ==
- Alberts, Fred G., ed. (1995), Geographic Names of the Antarctic (PDF) (2 ed.), United States Board on Geographic Names This article incorporates public domain material from websites or documents of the United States Board on Geographic Names.

REMA Explorer
The Reference Elevation Model of Antarctica (REMA) gives ice surface measurements of most of the continent. When a feature is ice-covered, the ice surface will differ from the underlying rock surface and will change over time. To see ice surface contours and elevation of a feature as of the last REMA update,
- Open the Antarctic REMA Explorer
- Enter the feature's coordinates in the box at the top left that says "Find address or place", then press enter
  The coordinates should be in DMS format, e.g. 65°05'03"S 64°01'02"W. If you only have degrees and minutes, you may not be able to locate the feature.
- Hover over the icons at the left of the screen
- Find "Hillshade" and click on that
  In the bottom right of the screen, set "Shading Factor" to 0 to get a clearer image
- Find "Contour" and click on that
  In the "Contour properties" box, select Contour Interval = 1m
  You can zoom in and out to see the ice surface contours of the feature and nearby features
- Find "Identify" and click on that
  Click the point where the contour lines seem to indicate the top of the feature
  The "Identify" box will appear to the top left. The Orthometric height is the elevation of the ice surface of the feature at this point.

- Antarctic REMA Explorer (Digital Elevation Models created by the Polar Geospatial Center from Maxar imagery), Polar Geospatial Center, University of Minnesota, 2019
- "Chipev Nunatak", Composite Gazetteer of Antarctica, Scientific Committee on Antarctic Research
- "Darzalas Peak", Composite Gazetteer of Antarctica, Scientific Committee on Antarctic Research
- Graham Land and South Shetland Islands, BAS: British Antarctic Survey, 2005
- "Kavlak Peak", Composite Gazetteer of Antarctica, Scientific Committee on Antarctic Research
- "Kopriva Peak", Composite Gazetteer of Antarctica, Scientific Committee on Antarctic Research
- "Paramun Buttress", Composite Gazetteer of Antarctica, Scientific Committee on Antarctic Research
- "Rott Inlet", Composite Gazetteer of Antarctica, Scientific Committee on Antarctic Research
- "Mundraga Bay", Composite Gazetteer of Antarctica, Scientific Committee on Antarctic Research
- "Trave Peak", Composite Gazetteer of Antarctica, Scientific Committee on Antarctic Research

This article incorporates public domain material from websites or documents of the United States Geological Survey.
