= Florentino Ameghino Dam =

Dam in Chubut, Argentina

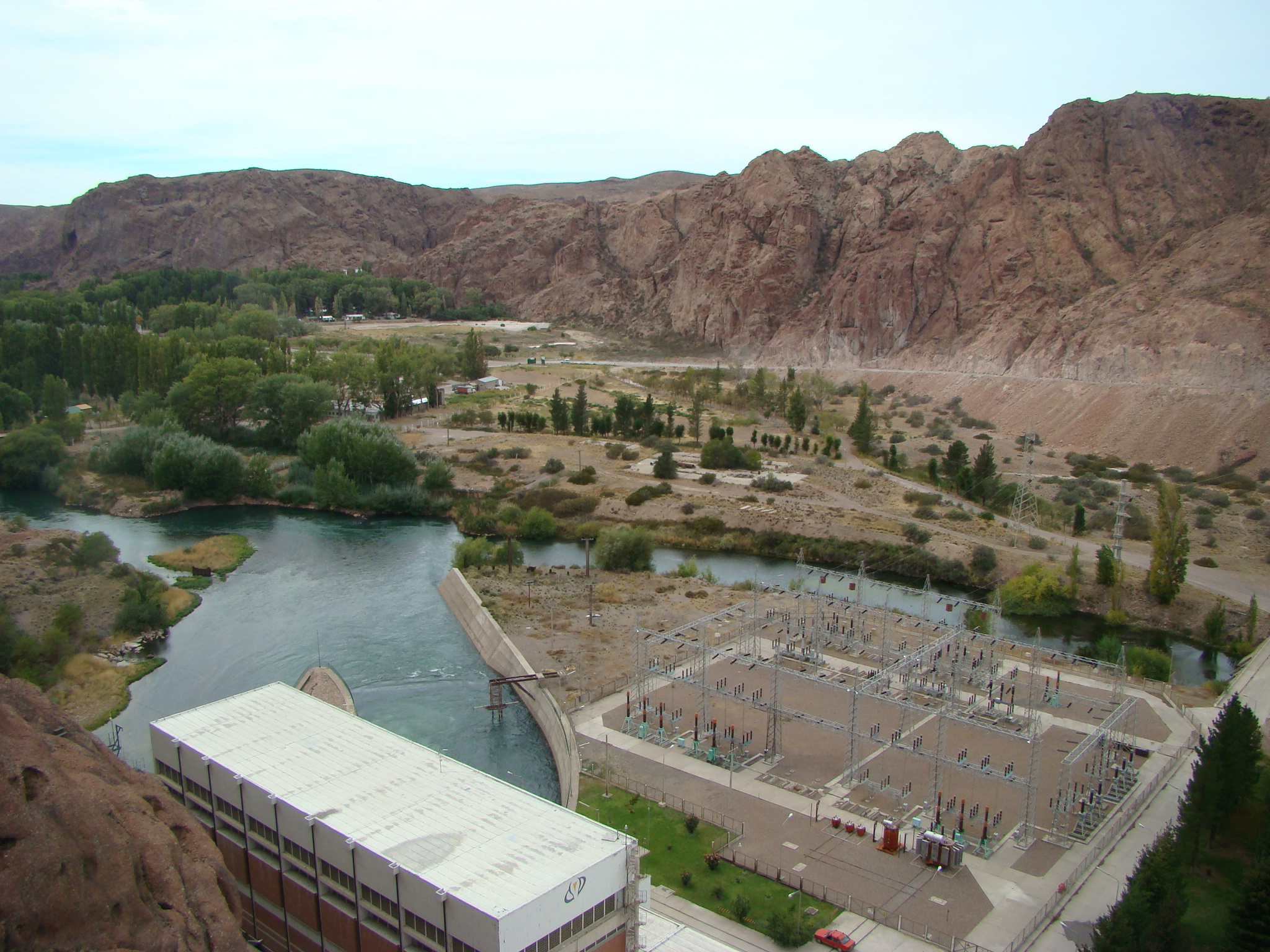

- Location within Argentina
- Official name: Dique Florentino Ameghino
- Country: Argentina
- Location: Chubut Province
- Coordinates: 43°26′43.57″S 65°56′33.28″W
- Status: Operational
- Construction began: 1943
- Opening date: 1963

Dam and spillways
- Impounds: Chubut River
- Height: 113 m (371 ft)
- Length: 225 m (738 ft)

Reservoir
- Creates: Florentino Ameghino Reservoir
- Total capacity: 65,000,000 m^{3} (53,000 acre⋅ft)

Power Station
- Turbines: 2 x 23,4 MW
- Installed capacity: 46.8 MW (62,800 hp)

The Florentino Ameghino Dam (Dique Florentino Ameghino) (Welsh: Yr Argae) is a gravity dam in Chubut Province, Patagonia, Argentina, 140 kilometres (87 mi) west of the city of Trelew. The dam also protects the towns in the lower Chubut River valley from flooding.

The Florentino Ameghino is located on the Chubut River, which originates from snowmelt in the Andes. Work began on the dam in 1943, led by the engineer Antonio Pronsato; the dam was inaugurated in 1963. The dam has two Francis turbines of 23.4 megawatts (31,400 hp) each. The dam is currently operated by Hidroeléctrica Ameghino.

Adjacent to the dam is a town with approximately 200 residents called Villa Dique Florentino Ameghino. The dam takes its name from Florentino Ameghino, an Argentine naturalist, paleontologist, anthropologist and zoologist.
