= Centro Ameghino =

Hospital in Buenos Aires, Argentina

Coordinates: 34.598727°S 58.41083°W

Centro Ameghino is a hospital in Buenos Aires, Argentina. It was founded in 1948 by the Ministry of Health, and was initially designated as the "Institute of Applied Psychopathology"
