= Florentino Ameghino Partido =

Florentino Ameghino Partido de Florentino Ameghino
- Department
- Flag

- location of Florentino Ameghino Partido in Buenos Aires Province
- Coordinates: 34°49′S 62°47′W
- Country: Argentina
- Established: March 21, 1991
- Seat: Florentino Ameghino

Government
  - Intendant: Nahuel Mittelbach (UCR)

Area
  - Total: 1,824 km^{2} (704 sq mi)

Population
  - Total: 8,171
  - Density: 4.480/km^{2} (11.60/sq mi)
- Demonym: ameghinense
- Postal Code: B6064
- IFAM: BUE041
- Area Code: 03388
- Website: www.ameghino.gov.ar

Florentino Ameghino Partido is a partido in the northwest of Buenos Aires Province in Argentina.

The provincial subdivision has a population of about 8,000 inhabitants in an area of 1,824 km^{2} (704 sq mi), and its capital city is Florentino Ameghino, which is 430 km (267 mi) from Buenos Aires.

== Name ==
Florentino Ameghino Partido is named after Argentine naturalist, paleontologist, anthropologist and zoologist Florentino Ameghino.

== Settlements ==
- Blaquier
- Eduardo Costa
- Florentino Ameghino
- Nueva Suiza
- Porvenir
