= Florentino Ameghino, Buenos Aires =

Florentino Ameghino
- Location in Argentina
- Coordinates: 34°49′S 62°27′W
- Country: Argentina
- Province: Buenos Aires
- Partido: Florentino Ameghino
- Founded: July 10, 1910
- Elevation: 100 m (330 ft)

Population (2001 census [INDEC])
  - Total: 6,217
- CPA Base: B 6064
- Area code: +54 3388

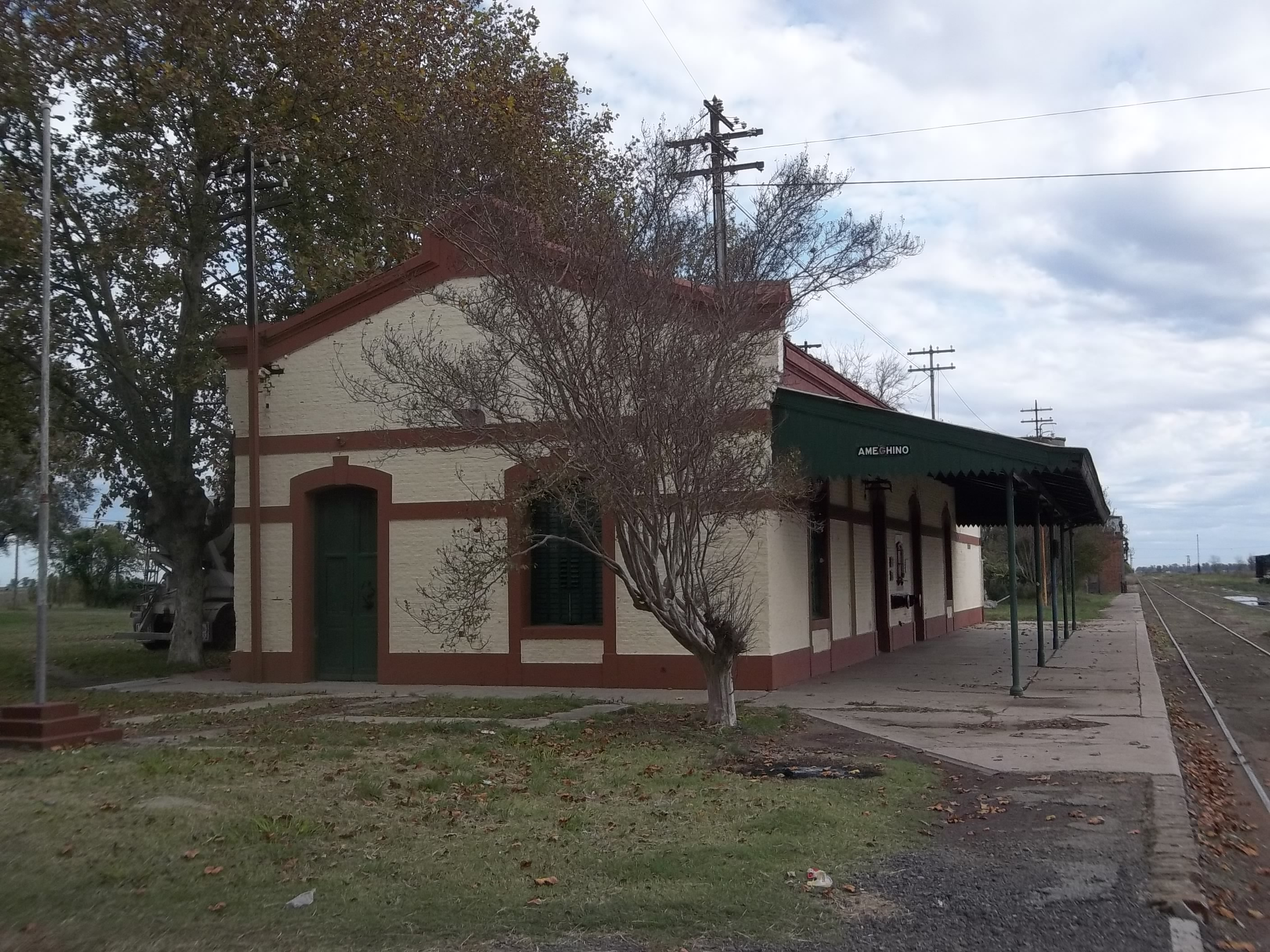
Ameghino Station

Florentino Ameghino is a town in Buenos Aires Province, Argentina. It is the administrative seat of the Florentino Ameghino Partido.

The town is named after Argentine naturalist, paleontologist, anthropologist and zoologist Florentino Ameghino.
