= Villa Dique Florentino Ameghino =

- Rural commune
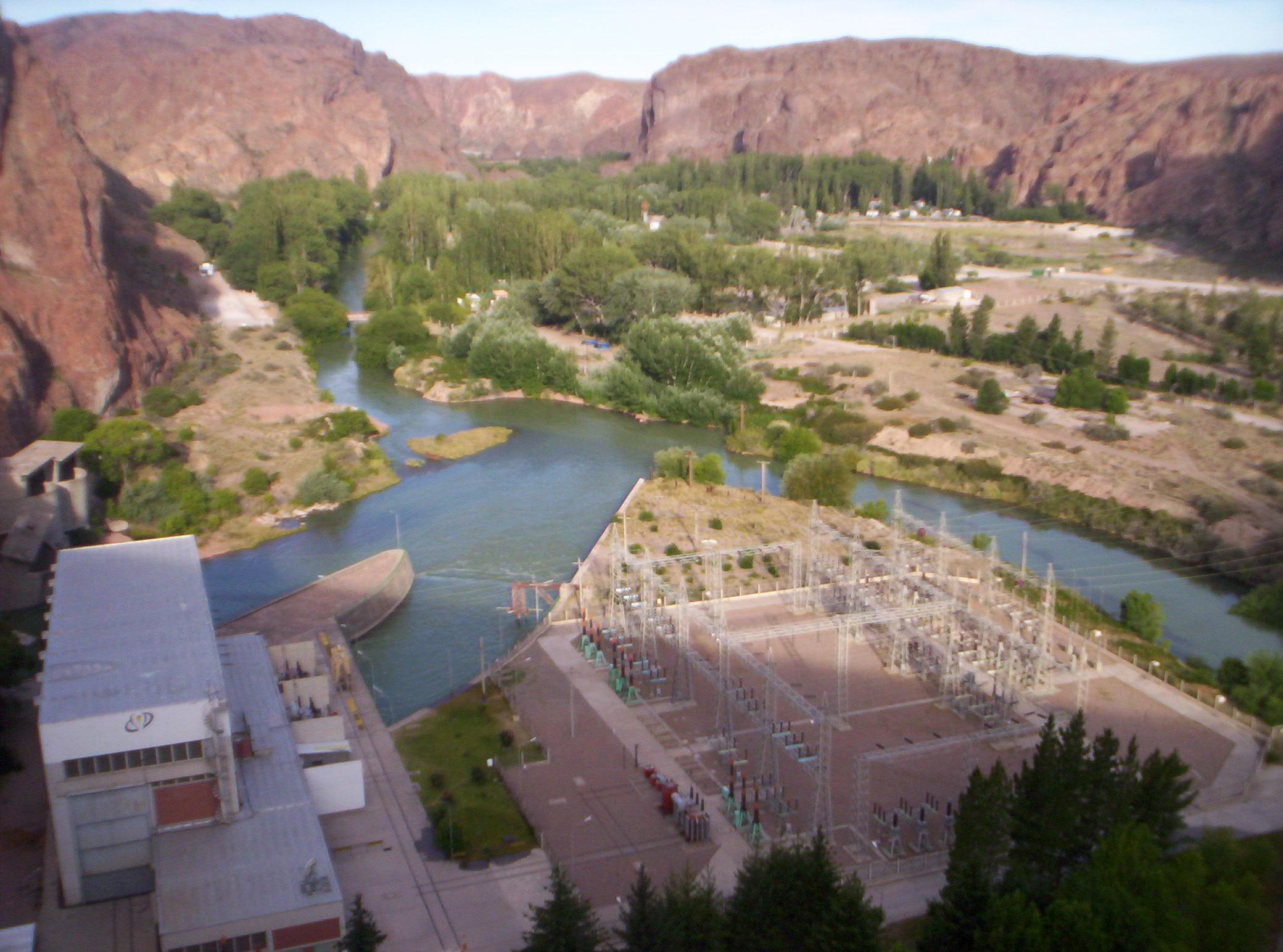

- Location within Argentina
- Coordinates: 43.70°S 66.47°W
- Country: Argentina
- Province: Chubut
- Department: Gaiman

Government
  - Jefe Comunal (Commune Chief): Antonio Méndez

Population (2001)
  - Total: 224
- Time zone: UTC−3 (ART)
- Climate: BWk
- Website: www.florentino-ameghino.gov.ar

Villa Dique Florentino Ameghino is a rural commune in Chubut Province in southern Argentina. It is located next to the Florentino Ameghino Dam on the Chubut River, 140 kilometres (87 mi) to the west of the city of Trelew. The town had 224 residents as of the 2001 census, an 18.5% increase from the previous (1991) census, when it had 189 residents.
