= Larsen Inlet =

Body of water in Graham Land, Antarctica

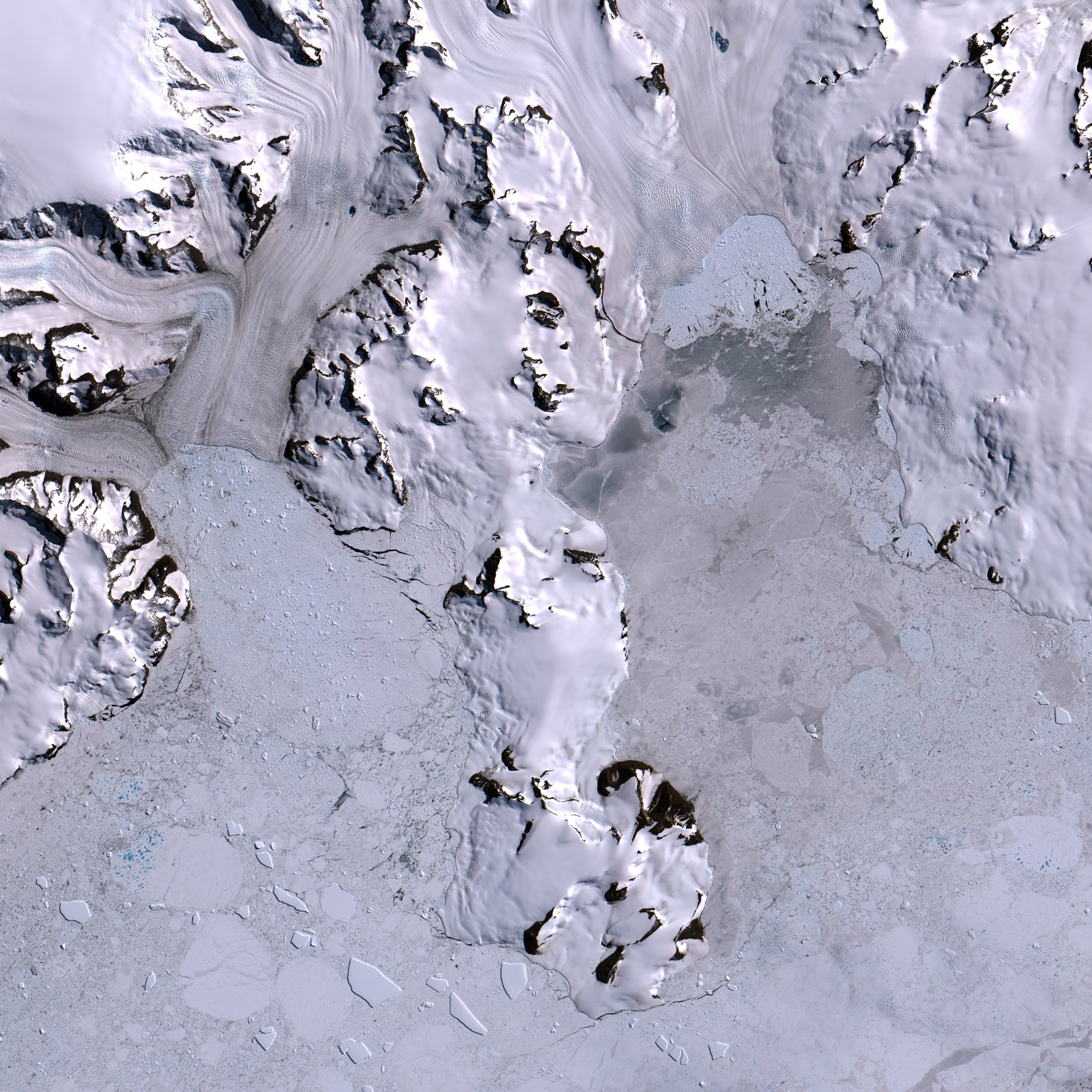
- Sobral Peninsula 31 January 2020. Larsen Inlet to the east (right).

- Location within Antarctica
- Coordinates: 64°26′S 59°26′W

Larsen Inlet (64°26′S 59°26′W) is an inlet, formerly ice-filled, 12 nautical miles (22 km; 14 mi) long in a north–south direction and 7 nautical miles (13 km; 8.1 mi) wide, between Cape Longing and Cape Sobral along the east coast of Graham Land, Antarctica.

== Location ==
Nordenskjöld Coast, Antarctic Peninsula. Larsen Inlet at the northeast end

Larsen inlet is at the east end of the Nordenskjöld Coast of the Antarctic Peninsula. It is south of Mount Hornsby and the Detroit Plateau. Mount Tucker and the Longing Peninsula are to the east, and the Sobral Peninsula is to the west. The inlet opens to the south onto the Weddell Sea. The mouth of the inlet is between Cape Sobral to the west and Cape Longing to the east.

== Discovery and name ==
Carl Anton Larsen, a Norwegian whaling captain, reported a large bay in this area in 1893, and Larsen's name was suggested for the feature by Edwin Swift Balch in 1902. The inlet was re-identified and charted by the Falkland Islands Dependencies Survey (FIDS) in 1947.

== Glaciology ==
The 350 square kilometres (140 sq mi) Larsen Inlet ice shelf, north of the Larsen A Ice Shelf, was ice-filled in 1986, but mostly ice-free in 1988. The effect of an ice shelf like this disappearing is that glaciers that were held back by it start to side faster into the ocean.

== Eastern features ==
Eastern features and nearby features, from south to north, include:

=== Pizos Bay ===
64°27′50″S 59°03′00″W A 10.65 kilometres (6.62 mi) wide bay indenting for 9 kilometres (5.6 mi) Nordenskjöld Coast northwest of Samotino Point and southeast of Porphyry Bluff. Formed as a result of glacier retreat in the last decade of the 20th century. Named after the ancient settlement of Pizos in Southern Bulgaria.

=== Porphyry Bluff ===
64°27′S 59°11′W. A prominent rocky bluff extending from the coast to 2 nautical miles (3.7 km; 2.3 mi), between Larsen Inlet and Longing Gap. Mapped from surveys by the Falkland Islands Dependencies Survey (FIDS; 1960–61). Named by the UK Antarctic Place-Names Committee (UK-APC) after the buff-colored quartz-plagioclase-porphyry rock which is characteristic of this exposure.

=== Windscoop Nunataks ===
64°25′S 59°07′W. A cluster of four gable-shaped nunataks rising to about 400 metres (1,300 ft) high between Porphyry Bluff and Tower Peak. So named by UK-APC following British Antarctic Survey (BAS) geological work, 1978–79, from the windscoops associated with each nunatak.

=== Hampton Bluffs ===
64°25′S 59°18′W. A group of three rock bluffs on the east side of Larsen Inlet. Mapped from surveys by FIDS (1960–61). Named by UK-APC for lan F.G. Hampton, FIDS physiologist at Hope Bay in 1959 and 1960.

=== Tower Peak ===
64°23′S 59°09′W. A peak, 855 metres (2,805 ft) high, whose rock exposure stands out clearly from an evenly contoured icefield 5 nautical miles (9.3 km; 5.8 mi) northwest of Longing Gap. First charted and given this descriptive name by the FIDS, 1945.

=== Mount Tucker ===
64°20′S 59°16′W. A distinctive rock mountain mass 9 nautical miles (17 km; 10 mi) northwest of Longing Gap, overlooking Larsen Inlet. Mapped from surveys by FIDS (1960–61). Named by UK-APC after the Tucker Sno-cat Corporation of Medford, Oregon, makers of Sno-Cat vehicles.

=== Mount Brading ===
64°17′S 59°17′W. A mountain topped by a snow peak, 4 nautical miles (7.4 km; 4.6 mi) east of the northeast corner of Larsen Inlet. Surveyed by FIDS (1960–61) and named after Christopher G. Brading, FIDS surveyor at Hope Bay (1959–60), who, with I. Hampton, R. Harbour, and J. Winham, made the first ascent of this mountain.

=== Holt Nunatak ===
64°17′S 59°21′W. A prominent nunatak lying at the northeast corner of Larsen Inlet. Mapped from surveys by FIDS (1960–61). Named by UK-APC after the Holt Manufacturing Company of Stockton, California, which, in 1906, began commercial production of chain-track tractors, and the Holt Caterpillar Tractor Company of New York, founded two years later.

== Northern features ==
Northern features and nearby features, from west to east, include

=== Albone Glacier ===
64°13′S 59°42′W. A deeply entrenched narrow glacier on the east side of Wolseley Buttress flowing southward from Detroit Plateau. Mapped by FIDS from surveys (1960–61). Named by UK-APC for Dan Albone, English designer of the Ivel tractor, the first successful tractor with an internal combustion engine.

=== Bolgar Buttress ===
64°12′45″S 59°41′20″W A ice-covered buttress rising to 1,688 metres (5,538 ft) high on the southeast side of Detroit Plateau. Situated between the upper courses of Pyke Glacier and Albone Glacier, 4.1 kilometres (2.5 mi) southwest of Zasele Peak and 5.15 kilometres (3.20 mi) northeast of Kopriva Peak. Steep and partly ice-free west, south and east slopes. Named after the medieval city of Bolghar, capital of Volga Bulgaria in the 8–15th century AD.

=== Pyke Glacier ===
64°15′S 59°36′W. A glacier 5 nautical miles (9.3 km; 5.8 mi) long, flowing southward from Detroit Plateau between Albone Glacier and Polaris Glacier. Mapped from surveys by FIDS (1960–61). Named by UK-APC for Geoffrey Pyke (1894–1948), English scientist who in 1941 originated the ideas developed by the Studebaker Corporation into the M-29 Tracked Cargo Carrier or "Weasel," the first really successful snow vehicle.

=== Zasele Peak ===
64°11′23″S 59°37′22″W An ice-covered peak rising to 1,250 metres (4,100 ft) high in the southeast foothills of Detroit Plateau. Situated between the upper courses of Polaris Glacier and Pyke Glacier, 4.82 kilometres (3.00 mi) west-northwest of Laki Peak, 6 kilometres (3.7 mi) north of Weasel Hill and 4.1 kilometres (2.5 mi) northeast of Bolgar Buttress. Precipitous and partly ice free west slopes. Named after the settlement of Zasele in Western Bulgaria.

=== Weasel Hill ===
64°15′S 59°33′W. A small distinctive elevation in the ice piedmont 5 nautical miles (9.3 km; 5.8 mi) north of Larsen Inlet, between Pyke Glacier and Polaris Glacier. Mapped from surveys by FIDS (1960–61). Named by UK-APC after the M-29 Tracked Cargo Carrier, or "Weasel," manufactured by the Studebaker Corporation.

=== Polaris Glacier ===
64°14′S 59°31′W. A distinctive glacier, 4 nautical miles (7.4 km; 4.6 mi) long, flowing southward from Detroit Plateau, between Pyke Glacier and Eliason Glacier. Mapped from surveys by FIDS (1960–61). Named by UK-APC after the "Polaris" motor sledge made by Polaris Industries, Roseau, Minnesota, and used in Antarctica since 1960.

=== Laki Peak ===
64°12′05″S 59°31′38″W An ice-covered peak rising to 1,302 metres (4,272 ft) high in the southeast foothills of Detroit Plateau. Situated between the upper courses of Eliason Glacier and Polaris Glacier, 8.85 kilometres (5.50 mi) west of Mount Hornsby and 4.82 kilometres (3.00 mi) east-southeast of Zasele Peak. Named after Laki, Plovdiv Province in Southern Bulgaria and Laki, Blagoevgrad Province in Southwestern Bulgaria.

=== Eliason Glacier ===
64°15′S 59°25′W. A glacier 5 nautical miles (9.3 km; 5.8 mi) long close west of Mount Hornsby, flowing south from Detroit Plateau into the ice piedmont north of Larsen Inlet. Mapped from surveys by FIDS (1960–61). Named by UK-APC after the Eliason Motor Toboggan, invented in 1924 and manufactured from 1924 to 1946 in the United States, then manufactured in Canada from 1947 to 1963, and used in Arctic Canada since 1950 and in the Antarctic since 1960.

== Western features ==
Western features and nearby features, from south to north, include:

=== Cletrac Peak ===
64°20′S 59°38′W. A conspicuous steep-sided peak at the northwest corner of Larsen Inlet, immediately north of Muskeg Gap. Mapped from surveys by FIDS (1960–61). Named by UK-APC after Cletrac tractors made by the Cleveland Tractor Company, Ohio, the first to be used successfully in the Antarctic, by Admiral Richard E. Byrd's second expedition (1933–35).

=== Dolen Peak ===
64°19′11″S 59°38′31″W A rocky peak rising to 819 metres (2,687 ft) high at the northwest coast of Larsen Inlet. Situated west of the lower course of Albone Glacier, 6.1 kilometres (3.8 mi) north by east of Cletrac Peak. Named after the settlement of Dolen in Southwestern Bulgaria.

=== Wolseley Buttress ===
64°12′S 59°47′W. A high buttress on the southern edge of Detroit Plateau, forming the west side of Albone Glacier. Mapped from surveys by FIDS (1960–61). Named by UK-APC after Wolseley Tool and Motor Car Company which, in 1908–10, designed the experimental motor sledge used by Captain Scott's 1910-13 expedition.

== Sources ==
- Alberts, Fred G., ed. (1995), Geographic Names of the Antarctic (PDF) (2 ed.), United States Board on Geographic Names This article incorporates public domain material from websites or documents of the United States Board on Geographic Names.

REMA Explorer
The Reference Elevation Model of Antarctica (REMA) gives ice surface measurements of most of the continent. When a feature is ice-covered, the ice surface will differ from the underlying rock surface and will change over time. To see ice surface contours and elevation of a feature as of the last REMA update,
- Open the Antarctic REMA Explorer
- Enter the feature's coordinates in the box at the top left that says "Find address or place", then press enter
  The coordinates should be in DMS format, e.g. 65°05'03"S 64°01'02"W. If you only have degrees and minutes, you may not be able to locate the feature.
- Hover over the icons at the left of the screen
- Find "Hillshade" and click on that
  In the bottom right of the screen, set "Shading Factor" to 0 to get a clearer image
- Find "Contour" and click on that
  In the "Contour properties" box, select Contour Interval = 1m
  You can zoom in and out to see the ice surface contours of the feature and nearby features
- Find "Identify" and click on that
  Click the point where the contour lines seem to indicate the top of the feature
  The "Identify" box will appear to the top left. The Orthometric height is the elevation of the ice surface of the feature at this point.

- Antarctic REMA Explorer (Digital Elevation Models created by the Polar Geospatial Center from Maxar imagery), Polar Geospatial Center, University of Minnesota, 2019
- "Bolgar Buttress", Composite Gazetteer of Antarctica, Scientific Committee on Antarctic Research
- "Dolen Peak", Composite Gazetteer of Antarctica, Scientific Committee on Antarctic Research
- Fox, Douglas (July 2012), "Scientists Trek to Collapsing Glaciers to Assess Antarctica's Meltdown and Sea-Level Rise", Scientific American
- Graham Land and South Shetland Islands, BAS: British Antarctic Survey, 2005
- "Laki Peak", Composite Gazetteer of Antarctica, Scientific Committee on Antarctic Research
- "Pizos Bay", Composite Gazetteer of Antarctica, Scientific Committee on Antarctic Research
- "Zasele Peak", Composite Gazetteer of Antarctica, Scientific Committee on Antarctic Research
