= Longing Peninsula =

Peninsula in Antarctica

- Location within Antarctica

Geography
- Coordinates: 64°30′S 58°50′W

Administration
- Antarctica

The Longing Peninsula (64°30′S 58°50′W) is a peninsula 9 nautical miles (17 km; 10 mi) long terminating in Cape Longing, situated at the northeast end of the Nordenskjöld Coast where it separates the Larsen Ice Shelf from the Prince Gustav Ice Shelf.

== Location ==
Trinity Peninsula, Antarctic Peninsula. Longing Peninsula southeast on coast

The Longing Peninsula extends from the southeast coast of the Trinity Peninsula into Prince Gustav Channel in Graham Land at the northeast end of the Antarctic Peninsula. It is at the northeast end of Nordenskjold Coast. Larsen Inlet is to the west of the peninsula, the Weddell Sea to the south and Prince Gustav Channel to the east. Mount Tucker is to the north. The Florentino Ameghino Refuge is an Argentine camp on Cape Longing, at the tip of the peninsula.

== Discovery and name ==
The Longing Peninsula was discovered and roughly charted by Otto Nordenskjöld, leader of the Swedish Antarctic Expedition (SwedAE), 1901–1904, who named Cape Longing. The peninsula was named after the cape by the UK Antarctic Place-Names Committee (UK-APC) following British Antarctic Survey (BAS) geological work in the area, 1987–88.

== Features ==
Features of the peninsula, and nearby features, include

=== Cape Longing ===
64°33′S 58°50′W. A rocky cape on the east coast of Graham Land, forming the south end of a large ice-covered promontory which marks the west side of the south entrance to Prince Gustav Channel. Discovered by the SwedAE under Nordenskjold in 1902, and so named by him because from the position of his winter hut on Snow Hill Island the cape lay in the direction of his "land of longing" which he was anxious to explore.

=== Longing Gap ===
64°25′S 58°57′W. A constriction in the promontory north of Cape Longing, where the land narrows to 2 nautical miles (3.7 km; 2.3 mi) and forms a low isthmus. The gap is used to avoid the long detour around Cape Longing. Mapped from surveys by the Falkland Islands Dependencies Survey (FIDS) (1960–61). Named by the UK Antarctic Place-Names Committee (UK-APC) in association with Cape Longing.

=== Nordenskjöld Outcrops ===
64°27′S 58°58′W. Rock outcrops on the west side of Longing Peninsula. The feature extends south for 2 nautical miles (3.7 km; 2.3 mi) from the vicinity of Longing Gap and is the type locality for the geologic Nordenskjold Formation. Named by the UK-APC following BAS geological work, 1987–88, after Otto Nordenskjold, leader of the SwedAE, 1901–1904, who explored this coast in 1902.

=== Ameghino Gully ===
64°28′S 58°38′W. A gully running E-W through the outcrops on the west side of Longing Peninsula, Nordenskjold Coast. The name derives from "Refugio Ameghino", the Argentine refuge situated on the southwest side of Longing Gap and named in turn after Florentino Ameghino (1854–1911), Argentine geologist and anthropologist; Director, Museum of Natural History, Buenos Aires, 1902–1911. Named by the UK-APC in 1990.

== Sources ==
- Alberts, Fred G., ed. (1995), Geographic Names of the Antarctic (PDF) (2 ed.), United States Board on Geographic Names This article incorporates public domain material from websites or documents of the United States Board on Geographic Names.
- Graham Land and South Shetland Islands, BAS: British Antarctic Survey, 2005

This article incorporates public domain material from websites or documents of the United States Geological Survey.
