= Cierva Point and offshore islands Important Bird Area =

Important Bird Area of Antarctica

Coordinates: 64°10′S 61°01′W

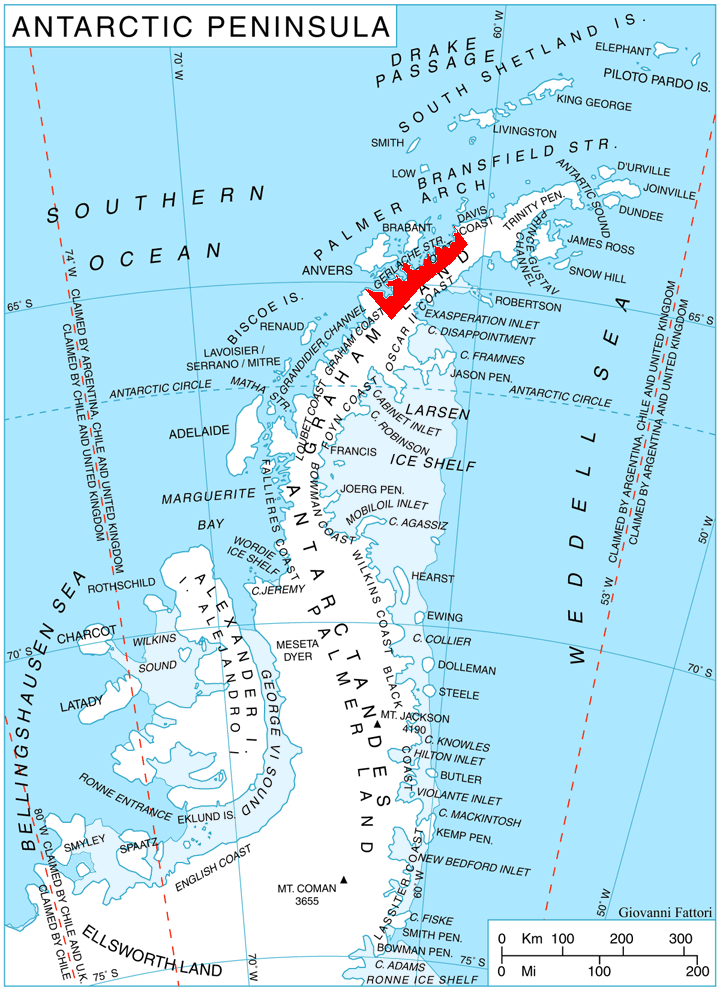
Location of Danco Coast on Graham Land, Antarctic Peninsula.

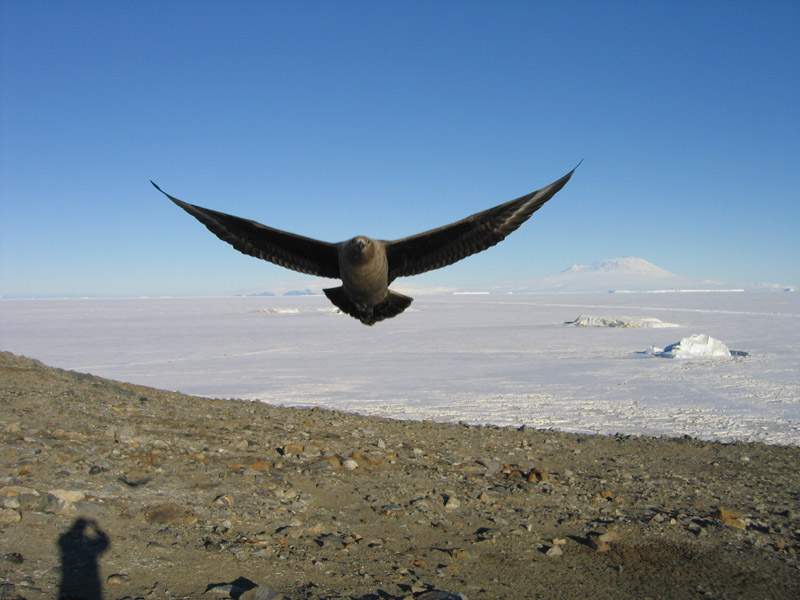
The IBA is an important breeding site for south polar skuas

The Cierva Point and offshore islands Important Bird Area is a 6540 ha tract of land and sea on the Danco Coast of the Antarctic Peninsula.

== Description ==
The Important Bird Area (IBA) lies 50 km to the east of Brabant Island, with Cierva Point forming both the northwest extremity of Sladun Peninsula and the south side of the entrance to Cierva Cove. The IBA is defined by the same boundary as Antarctic Specially Protected Area (ASPA 134) which includes Cierva Point, Midas Island, Sterneck Island, Moss Islands and other offshore islands as well as the intervening sea and intertidal zone. At Cierva Point the south-facing slopes are glaciated, whilst the north- and west-facing slopes are ice-free. The land rises to over 500 m at the coastal cliffs. The Argentine Primavera Station lies close to the IBA boundary on the northern tip of Cierva Point.

== Flora and fauna ==
The site was designated an ASPA for the great scientific value of its unusual biodiversity, including many species of plants, birds, and invertebrates. The unique topography, with the abundance and diversity of the vegetation, have created favourable conditions for the formation of numerous microhabitats. The extensive coastal vegetation includes lichens, mosses and grasses, with Antarctic hairgrass and Antarctic pearlwort. The mineral soils contain cyanobacteria and diatoms. Terrestrial arthropods and non-marine microalgae are abundant.

=== Birds ===
The site has been identified as an IBA by BirdLife International because it supports about 500 breeding pairs of south polar skuas. Other birds recorded as nesting there include imperial shags, southern giant petrels, chinstrap and gentoo penguins, Wilson's storm petrels, Cape petrels, snow petrels, kelp gulls, Antarctic terns and snowy sheathbills.
