= Sterneck =

Sterneck is a surname. Notable people with the surname include:

- Berthold Sterneck (1887–1943), Austrian operatic bass
- Esta Sterneck, German molecular biologist
- Kurt Sterneck (1919–1998), Austro-German actor and radio play narrator
- Maximilian Daublebsky von Sterneck (1829–1897), Austrian admiral
- Moritz Daublebsky-Sterneck (1912–1986), Austrian Righteous Among the Nations
- Robert von Sterneck (1839–1910), Austro-Hungarian army officer, astronomer, and geodesist

== See also ==
- Cape Sterneck
- Sterneck Island
