= Pefaur Peninsula =

Peninsula in Antarctica

- Location within Antarctica

Geography
- Location: Gerlache Strait
- Coordinates: 64°27′00″S 61°27′00″W

The Pefaur Peninsula (64°27′00″S 61°27′00″W), also called Península Ventimiglia, is a peninsula which constitutes the separation between Hughes Bay, to the north, and Charlotte Bay, to the south, on the west coast of the Antarctic Peninsula.

== Location ==
Danco Coast, Antarctic Peninsula. Pefaur Peninsula in center

Pefaur Peninsula lies on the west coast of the Antarctic Peninsula. The peninsula is bounded by Hughes Bay to the northeast and Charlotte Bay to the south, and is separated from Brabant Island to the northwest by the Gerlache Strait. The Herbert Plateau is to the southeast. Murray Island (Bluff Island) is to the north. Valdivia Point stands at its northern extremity.

== Name ==
Pefaur Peninsula is named for Jaime E. Pefaur, a biologist from the University of Chile, who carried out studies of edaphic mesofauna in Antarctica aboard the Yelcho during the Chilean Antarctic Expedition of 1967–1968. Argentina calls it the Península Ventimiglia (Twenty Miles Peninsula).

== Glaciers ==
=== Zimzelen Glacier ===
64°27′00″S 61°17′40″W A 3.7 kilometres (2.3 mi) long and 2.5 kilometres (1.6 mi) wide glacier on the Pefaur Peninsula. Situated east of Krapets Glacier and west of Blériot Glacier. Draining northwards, and flowing into the east arm of Salvesen Cove. Named after the settlement of Zimzelen in Southern Bulgaria.

=== Krapets Glacier ===
64°26′40″S 61°21′00″W The 3.5 kilometres (2.2 mi) long and 1.4 kilometres (0.87 mi) wide glacier on Pefaur Peninsula. Situated east of Agalina Glacier and west of Zimzelen Glacier. Draining northwards, and flowing into the east arm of Salvesen Cove. Named after the settlements of Krapets, Dobrich Province and Krapets, Vratsa Province in Northwestern and Northeastern Bulgaria.

=== Agalina Glacier ===
64°26′20″S 61°26′00″W The 4.8 kilometres (3.0 mi) long and 2.9 kilometres (1.8 mi) wide glacier on Pefaur Peninsula. Situated east of Poduene Glacier and west of Krapets Glacier. Draining northwards, and flowing into both Graham Passage and the west arm of Salvesen Cove. Named after Agalina Point on the Bulgarian Black Sea Coast.

=== Poduene Glacier ===
64°26′30″S 61°32′00″W A 3.3 kilometres (2.1 mi) long and 2.4 kilometres (1.5 mi) wide glacier on Pefaur (Ventimiglia) Peninsula. Situated west of Agalina Glacier, draining the north slopes of Mount Zeppelin and flowing northwestwards into Gerlache Strait east of Eckener Point. Named after the settlement of Poduene in Western Bulgaria, now part of the city of Sofia.

== Other features ==
=== Mount Zeppelin ===
64°27′S 61°31′W. Mountain, 1,265 metres (4,150 ft) high, standing 3 nautical miles (5.6 km; 3.5 mi) southeast of Eckener Point. Charted by the Belgian Antarctic Expedition (BelgAE) under Adrien de Gerlache, 1897–99. Named by the UK Antarctic Place-Names Committee (UK-APC) in 1960 for Count Ferdinand von Zeppelin (1838–1917), German aeronautical engineer who perfected the large-scale rigid airship, 1894–1917.

=== Eckener Point ===
64°26′S 61°36′W. Point marking the northeast side of the entrance to Charlotte Bay, on the west coast of Graham Land. First roughly charted by the BelgAE under Gerlache, 1897–99. Named by the UK-APC in 1960 for Hugo Eckener (1868–1954), German pioneer of airship aviation, president of Aeroarctic, an international society for exploration of the Arctic with airships, 1929–37, who piloted the Graf Zeppelin for more than 600 flights including a major Arctic flight in 1931.

=== Latinka Cove ===
64°25′50″S 61°34′10″W A 1.95 kilometres (1.21 mi) wide cove indenting the northwest coast of Pefaur Peninsula for 1.65 kilometres (1.03 mi). The entrance is east of Eckener Point and west of Binkos Point. The head of the cove is fed by Poduene Glacier. Named after the settlement of Latinka in Southern Bulgaria.

=== Binkos Point ===
64°25′21″S 61°34′09″W A point on the northeast side of the entrance to Latinka Cove on the northwest coast of Pefaur Peninsula. Situated 1.95 kilometres (1.21 mi) northeast of Eckener Point and 1.7 kilometres (1.1 mi) south of Escalonado Point. Named after the settlement of Binkos in Southeastern Bulgaria.

=== Santos Peak ===
64°25′S 61°32′W. Peak lying south of Murray Island, on the west coast of Graham Land. Charted by the BelgAE under Gerlache, 1897–99. Named by the UK-APC in 1960 for Alberto Santos-Dumont (1873–1932), Brazilian inventor resident in France, who designed and flew 14 small airships and accomplished the first official powered flight in Europe in 1906.

=== Escalonado Point ===
64°24′00″S 61°33′00″W This name originates from Argentina.

== Sources ==
- "Agalina Glacier", Composite Gazetteer of Antarctica, Scientific Committee on Antarctic Research
- Alberts, Fred G., ed. (1995), Geographic Names of the Antarctic (PDF) (2 ed.), United States Board on Geographic Names This article incorporates public domain material from websites or documents of the United States Board on Geographic Names.
- "Binkos Point", Composite Gazetteer of Antarctica, Scientific Committee on Antarctic Research
- "Escalonado, cabo", Composite Gazetteer of Antarctica, Scientific Committee on Antarctic Research
- Graham Land and South Shetland Islands, BAS: British Antarctic Survey, 2005
- "Krapets Glacier", Composite Gazetteer of Antarctica, Scientific Committee on Antarctic Research
- "Latinka Cove", Composite Gazetteer of Antarctica, Scientific Committee on Antarctic Research
- "Pefaur, Península", Composite Gazetteer of Antarctica, Scientific Committee on Antarctic Research
- "Poduene Glacier", Composite Gazetteer of Antarctica, Scientific Committee on Antarctic Research
- "Zimzelen Glacier", Composite Gazetteer of Antarctica, Scientific Committee on Antarctic Research
