= Cayley Glacier =

Glacier in Antarctica

- Location within Antarctica
- Location: Graham Land
- Coordinates: 64°20′00″S 60°58′00″W
- Highest elevation: 680 m (2,231 ft)
- Terminus: Brialmont Cove

The Cayley Glacier (64°20′00″S 60°58′00″W) is a glacier flowing northwest into the south side of Brialmont Cove, on the west coast of Graham Land, Antarctica.

== Location ==
Danco Coast, Antarctic Peninsula. Hughes Bay near the northeast end

Cayley Glacier terminates on the Danco Coast of the Antarctic Peninsula, on the west side of Graham Land. It flows north from the south end of the Detroit Plateau and the north end of the Herbert Plateau into Hughes Bay, which opens onto the Gerlache Strait. Baldwin Peak is a prominent feature of the east side of te glacier. It is joined from the right (east) by the Mouillard Glacier at its mouth.

== History ==
Cayley Glacier was photographed by the Falkland Islands and Dependencies Aerial Survey Expedition (FIDASE) in 1956–57 and mapped from these photos by the Falkland Islands Dependencies Survey (FIDS). It was named by the UK Antarctic Place-Names Committee (UK-APC) in 1960 for Sir George Cayley (1773–1857), English engineer, the "father of aeronautica," who first defined the main principles of mechanical flight, 1796–1857, and also designed the first caterpillar tractor in 1826.

== Eastern features ==
Features of the east (right) side include, from south to north:

=== Miller Spur ===
64°29′02″S 60°40′13″W A narrow rocky ridge of elevation decreasing from 1,700 metres (5,600 ft) to 900 metres (3,000 ft), projecting from Detroit Plateau 2.9 kilometres (1.8 mi) west-northwestwards into upper Cayley Glacier. Situated 7.13 kilometres (4.43 mi) south-southeast of Mount Berry, 2.4 kilometres (1.5 mi) southwest of the parallel Davidov Spur. Named after the German geologist Hubert Miller, researcher at St. Kliment Ohridski Base in 2001/02 season, for his support for the Bulgarian Antarctic programme.

=== Davidov Spur ===
64°28′23″S 60°37′40″W A narrow rocky ridge of elevation 1,492 metres (4,895 ft) high projecting from Detroit Plateau 2.75 kilometres (1.71 mi) west-northwestwards into upper Cayley Glacier. Situated between the parallel Galabinov Spur and Miller Spur that lie 1.75 kilometres (1.09 mi) to the northeast and 2.4 kilometres (1.5 mi) to the southwest respectively, 7.45 kilometres (4.63 mi) southeast of Mount Berry. Named after Nicky Davidov, photographer at St. Kliment Ohridski Base in 2000/01 and 2009/10 seasons, for his work on promoting awareness and appreciation of Antarctica.

=== Galabinov Spur ===
64°27′39″S 60°36′17″W A narrow rocky ridge descending from elevation 1,700 metres (5,600 ft) m to 975 metres (3,199 ft) and projecting projecting from Detroit Plateau 1.7 kilometres (1.1 mi) west-northwestwards into upper Cayley Glacier. Situated 1.75 kilometres (1.09 mi) northeast of the parallel Davidov Spur, 7.5 kilometres (4.7 mi) southeast of Mount Berry. Named after Chavdar Galabinov, construction engineer at St. Kliment Ohridski base in 2005/06 and subsequent seasons.

=== Mount Berry ===
64°26′S 60°43′W. Mountain 3 nautical miles (5.6 km; 3.5 mi) southeast of Baldwin Peak, near the head of Cayley Glacier. Photographed by the FIDASE in 1956-57, and mapped from these photos by the FIDS. Named by the UK-APC in 1960 for Albert Berry, American aviator who in 1912 made the first parachute descent from an airplane, using a pack-type parachute.

=== Baldwin Peak ===
64°23′S 60°45′W. Peak between Lilienthal Glacier and Mount Berry in northern Graham Land. Photographed by the FIDASE in 1956-57 and mapped from these photos by the FIDS. Named by the UK-APC in 1960 for Thomas Scott Baldwin (1860-1923), American inventor of the vent opening which gives control and stability to parachutes.

=== Lilienthal Glacier ===
64°21′S 60°48′W. Glacier flowing west into Cayley Glacier between Pilcher and Baldwin Peaks. Photographed by the FIDASE in 1956-57, and mapped from these photos by the FIDS. Named by the UK-APC in 1960 for Otto Lilienthal (1848-96), German pioneer of flight in gliders.

=== Pilcher Peak ===
64°19′S 60°49′W. Peak between Mouillard and Lilienthal Glaciers. Photographed by the FIDASE in 1956-57, and mapped from these photos by the FIDS. Named by the UK-APC in 1960 for Percy Pilcher (1866-99), British engineer and pioneer of gliding flight.

== Western features ==
Features of the west (left) side include, from south to north:

=== Obretenik Bastion ===
64°29′38″S 60°59′55″W An ice-covered buttress rising to 1,932 metres (6,339 ft) high at the northeast extremity of Herbert Plateau. Situated between upper Blériot Glacier and upper Cayley Glacier, 10 kilometres (6.2 mi) south of Mount Morton, 14.45 kilometres (8.98 mi) southwest of Mount Berry. Steep and partly ice-free west, north and east slopes. Named after the settlement of Obretenik in Northeastern Bulgaria.

=== Kormyansko Saddle ===
64°27′44″S 61°01′12″W An ice-covered saddle of elevation 992 metres (3,255 ft) high in the north foothills of Herbert Plateau, connecting Obretenik Bastion to Egerika Range on the N. Situated 3.7 kilometres (2.3 mi) north of Obretenik Bastion, 7.1 kilometres (4.4 mi) southeast of Farman Nunatak and 14 kilometres (8.7 mi) west-southwest of Mount Berry. Part of the glacial divide between Blériot Glacier to the west and Cayley Glacier to the east. Named after the settlement of Kormyansko in Northern Bulgaria.

=== Egerika Range ===
64°23′20″S 61°02′15″W A mostly ice-covered range extending 16.2 kilometres (10.1 mi) in south–north direction and 7 kilometres (4.3 mi) wide, rising to 1,314 metres (4,311 ft) high in the north foothills of Herbert Plateau. Connected to Obretenik Bastion to the south by Kormyansko Saddle. Surmounts Blériot Glacier to the west, Hughes Bay to the northwest and Cayley Glacier to the east. Named after the Thracian settlement of Egerika in Western Bulgaria.

=== Mount Morton ===
64°24′S 61°01′W. A mountain standing between Blériot Glacier and Cayley Glacier. Photographed by the FIDASE in 1956-57, and mapped from these photos by the FIDS. Named by the UK-APC in 1960 for Grant Morton, American aviator who made the first parachute descent from an airplane using a parachute carried loosely.

=== Tournachon Peak ===
64°19′S 61°05′W. Peak, 860 metres (2,820 ft) high, rising south of Spring Point on the west coast of Graham Land. Photographed by the FIDASE in 1956-57, and mapped from these photos by the FIDS. Named by the UK-APC in 1960 for Gaspard F. Tournachon (1820-1910), known professionally as Nadar, French portrait photographer and aeronaut who took the first air photos from a captive balloon in 1858 and suggested their use for mapmaking.

=== Spring Point ===
64°18′S 61°03′W. Point forming the south side of the entrance to Brialmont Cove. Discovered in 1898 by the Belgian Antarctic Expedition (BelgAE) under Gerlache. He named it for Professor W. Spring of the University of Liège, a member of the Belgica Commission.

== Sources ==
- Alberts, Fred G., ed. (1995), Geographic Names of the Antarctic (PDF) (2 ed.), United States Board on Geographic Names This article incorporates public domain material from websites or documents of the United States Board on Geographic Names.

REMA Explorer
The Reference Elevation Model of Antarctica (REMA) gives ice surface measurements of most of the continent. When a feature is ice-covered, the ice surface will differ from the underlying rock surface and will change over time. To see ice surface contours and elevation of a feature as of the last REMA update,
- Open the Antarctic REMA Explorer
- Enter the feature's coordinates in the box at the top left that says "Find address or place", then press enter
  The coordinates should be in DMS format, e.g. 65°05'03"S 64°01'02"W. If you only have degrees and minutes, you may not be able to locate the feature.
- Hover over the icons at the left of the screen
- Find "Hillshade" and click on that
  In the bottom right of the screen, set "Shading Factor" to 0 to get a clearer image
- Find "Contour" and click on that
  In the "Contour properties" box, select Contour Interval = 1m
  You can zoom in and out to see the ice surface contours of the feature and nearby features
- Find "Identify" and click on that
  Click the point where the contour lines seem to indicate the top of the feature
  The "Identify" box will appear to the top left. The Orthometric height is the elevation of the ice surface of the feature at this point.

- Antarctic REMA Explorer (Digital Elevation Models created by the Polar Geospatial Center from Maxar imagery), Polar Geospatial Center, University of Minnesota, 2019
- "Davidov Spur", Composite Gazetteer of Antarctica, Scientific Committee on Antarctic Research
- "Egerika Range", Composite Gazetteer of Antarctica, Scientific Committee on Antarctic Research
- "Galabinov Spur", Composite Gazetteer of Antarctica, Scientific Committee on Antarctic Research
- Graham Land and South Shetland Islands, BAS: British Antarctic Survey, 2005
- "Kormyansko Saddle", Composite Gazetteer of Antarctica, Scientific Committee on Antarctic Research
- "Miller Spur", Composite Gazetteer of Antarctica, Scientific Committee on Antarctic Research
- "Obretenik Bastion", Composite Gazetteer of Antarctica, Scientific Committee on Antarctic Research
