= Samodiva =

Samodiva may refer to:

- Samodiva (mythology), a woodland fairy in South-Slavic folklore and mythology
- Samodiva (village), a village in Bulgaria
- Samodiva Glacier, an Antarctic glacier
