= Hughes Bay =

Bay on the Northern coast of the Antarctic peninsula

- Location within Antarctica
- Coordinates: 64°13′S 61°20′W

Hughes Bay (64°13′S 61°20′W) is a bay lying between Cape Sterneck and Cape Murray along the west coast of the Antarctic Peninsula.

== Location ==
Danco Coast, Antarctic Peninsula. Hughes Bay near the northeast end

Hughes Bay is on the Danco Coast of the Antarctic Peninsula, on the west side of Graham Land. It is west of the southern end of the Detroit Plateau and north of the Herbert Plateau. It faces Two Hummock Island to the northwest across the Gerlache Strait. Major glaciers flowing into the bay include Sikorsky Glacier, Cayley Glacier and Blériot Glacier. The Argentine Base Primavera is on a headland in the north part of the bay. Hughes Bay is 42 kilometres (26 mi) wide and indents the Danco Coast by 20 kilometres (12 mi). It lies south of the Chavdar Peninsula and north of the Pefaur Peninsula.

== Name ==
The name "Hughes Bay" has appeared on maps for over 100 years, and commemorates Edward Hughes, master of the Sprightly, a sealing vessel owned by the London whaling company Samuel Enderby & Sons, which explored in this area in 1824–25.

== Exploration ==
The first recorded landing on the Antarctic mainland was made in the area of this bay by Captain John Davis (see Davis Coast) from the shallop Cecilia (see Cecilia Island), tender to his ship Huron (see Huron Glacier) on 7 February 1821. The bay was roughly charted by James Hoseason, First Mate in the British sealer Sprightly (see Sprightly Island) in December 1824 and was named Hughes' Bay after Captain Edward Hughes, the ship's master. The bay was further charted by the Belgian Antarctic Expedition (BeAE) during 23–25 January 1898. Air photography of the area by the Falkland Islands and Dependencies Aerial Survey Expedition (FIDASE) in 1956-57 led to important changes in topography and outline of the bay, as shown on maps and charts. Prior to this time many identifications of names in the area were no more than guesses.

== Glaciers ==
Glaciers feeding the bay, from northeast to southwest, include: Tumba Ice Cap, Gregory Glacier , Breguet Glacier, Sikorsky Glacier, Trepetlika Glacier, Mouillard Glacier, Lilienthal Glacier, Cayley Glacier, Blériot Glacier, Zimzelen Glacier, Krapets Glacier and Agalina Glacier.

=== Blériot Glacier ===
64°25′S 61°10′W. A short, but wide, glacier lying east of Salvesen Cove. Photographed by the FIDASE in 1956-57, and mapped from these photos by the FIDS. Named by the UK-APC in 1960 for Louis Blériot (1872-1936), French aviator who in 1907 flew the first full-size powered monoplane and made the first flight across the English Channel in July 1909.

=== Farman Nunatak ===
64°25′S 61°07′W. A nunatak, 655 metres (2,149 ft) high, rising west of Mount Morton in Blériot Glacier, on the west coast of Graham Land. Photographed by the FIDASE in 1956-57, and mapped from these photos by the FIDS. Named by the UK Antarctic Place-Names Committee (UK-APC) in 1960 for Henry Farman (1874-1958), pioneer Anglo-French aviator and aircraft designer, who carried the first airplane passenger in 1908.

== Islands ==
Island in the bay, from northeast to southwest, include: Moreno Rock, Moss Islands, Midas Island, Apéndice Island, Sprightly Island, Alcock Island, Roget Rocks, Afuera Islands, Murray Island, Challenger Island.

=== Moss Islands ===
64°09′S 61°03′W. Group of small islands and rocks lying east of Midas Island and north of Apendice Island in Hughes Bay. First charted in detail and given the descriptive name "Moos Inseln|(Moss Islands) by the SwedAE under Nordenskjold in 1902.

=== Midas Island ===
64°10′S 61°07′W. Island lying northwest of Apéndice Island. First seen by the Belgian Antarctic Expedition (BelgAE) under Adrien de Gerlache in 1898 and described as an island with two summits "like the ears of an ass." The name, given by the UK-APC in 1960, derives from this description; Midas, King of Phrygia, was represented in Greek satyric drama with the ears of an ass.

=== Roget Rocks ===
64°20′S 61°10′W. A small group of rocks 4 nautical miles (7.4 km; 4.6 mi) southwest of Spring Point in Hughes Bay, Graham Land. Surveyed by K.V. Blaiklock of FIDS from the Norsel in 1955. Named by UK-APC for Peter Mark Roget, a member of the committee which planned the expedition of the Chanticleer (1828–31) and author in 1852 of the Thesaurus of English Words and Phrases Classified and Arranged so as to Facilitate the Expression of Ideas and Assist in Literary Composition.

=== Afuera Islands ===
64°20′S 61°36′W. Group of three small islands lying north of Challenger Island and just outside the south entrance point to Hughes Bay. First charted by the French Antarctic Expedition (FrAE), 1908–10, under Jean-Baptiste Charcot. The name, which appears on an Argentine government chart of 1957, is probably descriptive of the island's location; "Afuera" means outer or outside.

== Coastal features ==
Coastal features, from northeast to southwest, include Cape Sterneck, Cierva Cove, Sladun Peninsula, Base Primavera, Relyovo Peninsula, Charles Point, Brialmont Cove, Spring Point, Brabazon Point, Salvesen Cove, and Valdivia Point.

=== Brabazon Point ===
64°24′S 61°16′W. Point forming the east side of the entrance to Salvesen Cove. Charted by the BelgAE under Gerlache, 1897-99. Named by the UK-APC in 1960 for John Moore-Brabazon, 1st Baron Brabazon of Tara, pioneer British aviator. He was the first British subject to fly an airplane in the British Isles, in April 1909, and responsible for the Royal Flying Corps Photographic Section during World War I and for the development of aerial photography.

=== Salvesen Cove ===
64°24′S 61°20′W. Cove forming the south extremity of Hughes Bay. The cove was partially outlined on the charts of the BelgAE under Gerlache, 1897-99. Probably named by whalers operating in this vicinity after Salvesen and Company, whalers of Leith, Scotland.

=== Valdivia Point ===
64°21′S 61°22′W. Point forming the northwest side of the entrance to Salvesen Cove. Charted and named "Valdivia Insel," after the German ship Valdivia, by the Swedish Antarctic Expedition (SwedAE) under Otto Nordenskjöld, 1901-04. Air photos taken by the FIDASE in 1956-57 show the feature to be joined to the mainland:

== Sources ==
- Alberts, Fred G., ed. (1995), Geographic Names of the Antarctic (PDF) (2 ed.), United States Board on Geographic Names This article incorporates public domain material from websites or documents of the United States Board on Geographic Names.
- Graham Land and South Shetland Islands, BAS: British Antarctic Survey, 2005
- "Hughes Bay", Composite Gazetteer of Antarctica, Scientific Committee on Antarctic Research
