= Sladun Peninsula =

Peninsula in Antarctica

- Location within Antarctica

Geography
- Location: Hughes Bay, Gerlache Strait
- Coordinates: 64°11′00″S 60°54′10″W

Sladun Peninsula (64°11′00″S 60°54′10″W) is the predominantly ice-covered 4.58 kilometres (2.85 mi) wide peninsula projecting from Danco Coast, Antarctic Peninsula 5.2 kilometres (3.2 mi) into Gerlache Strait south of Cierva Cove and north of Duarte Cove. It ends in Cierva Point and Sucia Point to the west. The feature is named after the settlement of Sladun in Southern Bulgaria.

== Location ==
Danco Coast, Antarctic Peninsula. Relyovo Peninsula near the northeast end

The peninsula extends into Hughes Bay, on the Gerlache Strait, which borders the Danco Coast of the Antarctic Peninsula, in Graham Land. The Chavdar Peninsula is to the north and the Relyovo Peninsula is to the south. The Sikorsky Glacier flows past the south of the peninsula to enter Duarte Cove. The Breguet Glacier flows past the north of the peninsula to enter Cierva Cove. The Argentine Base Primavera is on the tip of the peninsula.

- Copernix satellite image

=== Important Bird Area ===
The Cierva Point and offshore islands Important Bird Area is on the northwest extremity of the peninsula. It has the same extent as Antarctic Specially Protected Area No. 134. This includes Cierva Point in the northwest of the peninsula as well as Apéndice Island (Sterneck Island), Midas Island and Moss Islands. It holds a colony of South polar skua (Catharacta maccormicki).

== Features ==
Features, and nearby features, include

=== Sinitovo Gap ===
64°11′50″S 60°29′00″W. An ice-covered saddle of elevation 1,170 metres (3,840 ft) extending 1.6 kilometres (0.99 mi) in the northwest foothills of the Detroit Plateau. It connects Perkos Dome on the south to Kaliva Range on the northwest. It is part of the glacial divide between Wright Ice Piedmont to the east and Breguet Glacier to the west. Named after the settlement of Sinitovo in Southern Bulgaria.

=== Breguet Glacier ===
64°10′S 60°48′W. Glacier flowing into Cierva Cove south of Gregory Glacier. Shown on an Argentine government chart of 1957. Named by the UK Antarctic Place-Names Committee (UK-APC) in 1960 for Louis Charles Breguet (1880–1955) and Jacques Breguet (1881–1939), French aircraft designers who built and flew the first helicopter to carry a man, in vertical flight.

=== Cierva Cove ===
64°09′S 60°53′W. Cove lying 6 nautical miles (11 km; 6.9 mi) southeast of Cape Sterneck in Hughes Bay. Shown on an Argentine government chart of 1950. Named by the UK-APC in 1960 for Juan de la Cierva (1895–1936), Spanish designer of the autogiro, the first successful rotating wing aircraft in 1923.

=== Cierva Point ===
64°09′00″S 60°58′00″W. The south entrance point of Cierva Cove, "Refugio Primavera" [spring refuge] was established on the point by the Argentine Antarctic Expedition (AAE) on 23 January 1954. The AAE, 1976–77, established a new "Base Primavera" on the point which was officially opened on 8 March 1977. The point and nearby islands were designated SSSI No.15 under the Antarctic Treaty, and redesignated as ASPA No.134 in 2002.

=== Apéndice Island ===
64°11′S 61°02′W. Island lying northwest of Charles Point in Hughes Bay. The name appears on an Argentine government chart of 1957.

== Sources ==
- Alberts, Fred G., ed. (1995), Geographic Names of the Antarctic (PDF) (2 ed.), United States Board on Geographic Names This article incorporates public domain material from websites or documents of the United States Board on Geographic Names.

REMA Explorer
The Reference Elevation Model of Antarctica (REMA) gives ice surface measurements of most of the continent. When a feature is ice-covered, the ice surface will differ from the underlying rock surface and will change over time. To see ice surface contours and elevation of a feature as of the last REMA update,
- Open the Antarctic REMA Explorer
- Enter the feature's coordinates in the box at the top left that says "Find address or place", then press enter
  The coordinates should be in DMS format, e.g. 65°05'03"S 64°01'02"W. If you only have degrees and minutes, you may not be able to locate the feature.
- Hover over the icons at the left of the screen
- Find "Hillshade" and click on that
  In the bottom right of the screen, set "Shading Factor" to 0 to get a clearer image
- Find "Contour" and click on that
  In the "Contour properties" box, select Contour Interval = 1m
  You can zoom in and out to see the ice surface contours of the feature and nearby features
- Find "Identify" and click on that
  Click the point where the contour lines seem to indicate the top of the feature
  The "Identify" box will appear to the top left. The Orthometric height is the elevation of the ice surface of the feature at this point.

- Antarctic REMA Explorer (Digital Elevation Models created by the Polar Geospatial Center from Maxar imagery), Polar Geospatial Center. University of Minnesota, 2019
- "Cierva Point", Composite Gazetteer of Antarctica, Scientific Committee on Antarctic Research
- Cierva Point and offshore islands, Birdlife International
- Graham Land and South Shetland Islands, BAS: British Antarctic Survey, 2005
- "Sladun Peninsula", Composite Gazetteer of Antarctica, Scientific Committee on Antarctic Research
- "Sinitovo Gap", Composite Gazetteer of Antarctica, Scientific Committee on Antarctic Research
