= Murray Island, Antarctica =

Island off the west coast of Graham Land, Antarctica

Murray Island
- Location within Antarctica

Geography
- Location: Antarctica
- Coordinates: 64°22′S 61°34′W
- Length: 10 km (6 mi)

Administration
- Administered under the Antarctic Treaty System

Murray Island (64°22′S 61°34′W) is an island 6 nautical miles (11 km; 6.9 mi) long lying at the south-west side of Hughes Bay, off the west coast of Graham Land, Antarctica.

== Location ==
Danco Coast, Antarctic Peninsula. Hughes Bay near the northeast end

Murray Island is also known as Bluff Island. It lies at the southwest end of Hughes Bay, on the Danco Coast of the Antarctic Peninsula, on the west side of Graham Land. It is in the Gerlache Strait. Brabant Island is across the strait to the west, and Two Hummock Island is to the north. Murray Island lies between Hughes Bay to the northeast and Charlotte Bay to the southwest. The Herbert Plateau is to the southeast.

- Copernix satellite view

== Discovery and name ==
Murray Island has been known to seal hunters operating in the area since the 1820s, although it was shown on charts as part of the mainland. In 1922 the whale catcher Graham passed through the channel separating it from the mainland, proving its insularity. It was named in association with Cape Murray, the seaward extremity of the island.

== Important Bird Area ==
A 98 hectares (240 acres) ice-free site on the western side of a small peninsula on the northern coast of the island was designated the Bluff Island Important Bird Area (IBA) by BirdLife International because, in 1989, it supported a breeding colony of about 180 pairs of Antarctic shags (Phalacrocorax Atriceps Bransfieldensis).

== Features ==
Features, and nearby features, include:

=== Cape Murray ===
64°21′S 61°38′W. A cape forming the western end of Murray Island. First charted by the Belgian Antarctic Expedition (BelgAE) under Lieutenant Adrien de Gerlache (1897-99) and at the time considered to be joined to Graham Land. Named by Gerlache, presumably for Sir John Murray, British marine zoologist and oceanographer, an ardent advocate of Antarctic research.

=== Murray Harbor ===
64°21′S 61°35′W. A small harbor lying east of Cape Murray on the north side of Murray Island. The name was used by whalers in the area in 1922.

=== Challenger Island ===
64°21′S 61°35′W. An island lying just north of Murray Island. The name was used in 1906 by Johan Gunnar Andersson of the Swedish Antarctic Expedition (SwedAE) under Otto Nordenskjöld, 1901-04.

=== Graham Passage ===
64°24′S 61°31′W. A passage separating Murray Island from the west coast of Graham Land. Named by Captain Skidsmo after his whale catcher Graham, which was the first to pass through it, on March 20, 1922.

== Sources ==
- Alberts, Fred G., ed. (1995), Geographic Names of the Antarctic (PDF) (2 ed.), United States Board on Geographic Names This article incorporates public domain material from websites or documents of the United States Board on Geographic Names.
- "Bluff Island", Data Zone, Birdlife International
- Graham Land and South Shetland Islands, BAS: British Antarctic Survey, 2005
