= Latinka =

Latinka may refer to:

- Belarusian Latin alphabet
- Latinka, Kardzhali Province, Bulgaria
- Latinka Perović (1933–), Serbian historian
