= Relyovo Peninsula =

Peninsula projecting from Danco Coast, Antarctic Peninsula

- Location within Antarctica

Geography
- Location: Gerlache Strait
- Coordinates: 64°13′40″S 60°56′30″W

Relyovo Peninsula (64°13′40″S 60°56′30″W) is a predominantly ice-covered 5.2 kilometres (3.2 mi) wide peninsula projecting from Danco Coast, Antarctic Peninsula 4.8 kilometres (3.0 mi) into Gerlache Strait south of Duarte Cove and north of Brialmont Cove. It ends in Renzo Point and Charles Point to the west. The feature is named after the settlement of Relyovo in Western Bulgaria.

== Location ==
Danco Coast, Antarctic Peninsula. Relyovo Peninsula near the northeast end

The peninsula extends into Hughes Bay, on the Gerlache Strait, which borders the Danco Coast of the Antarctic Peninsula, in Graham Land. It lies to the south of the Sikorsky Glacier, which flows northwest from the Detroit Plateau into Hughes Bay.

- Copernix satellite image

== Central features ==
=== Razhana Buttress ===
64°16′06″S 60°40′34″W. An ice-covered buttress rising to 1,850 metres (6,070 ft) high on the west side of Detroit Plateau. Situated between tributaries to Lilienthal Glacier, Mouillard Gacier and Sikorsky Glacier, 6.52 kilometres (4.05 mi) southwest of Perkos Dome. Named after the settlement of Razhana in Western Bulgaria.

=== Zhelad Saddle ===
64°14′20″S 60°46′03″W. An ice-covered saddle of elevation 962 metres (3,156 ft) high extending 350 metres (1,150 ft) in the west foothills of Detroit Plateau on Danco Coast in Graham Land. Connecting the northwest slopes of Razhana Buttress to Sonketa Ridge. Situated 11.3 kilometres (7.0 mi) east of Charles Point. Part of the glacial divide between Sikorsky Glacier to the north and Trepetlika Glacier to the southwest. Named after the settlement of Zhelad in Northeastern Bulgaria.

=== Sonketa Ridge ===
64°13′40″S 60°53′00″W. A mostly ice-covered ridge extending 11.5 kilometres (7.1 mi) in an east–west direction and 4 kilometres (2.5 mi) wide, rising to 1,128 metres (3,701 ft) high in the west foothills of Detroit Plateau and partly on Relyovo Peninsula. Connected to the northwest slopes of Razhana Buttress to the east by Zhelad Saddle. Surmounts Sikorsky Glacier to the north and Trepetlika Glacier to the south. Sonketa is a Thracian place name from Western Bulgaria.

=== Charles Point ===
64°14′S 61°00′W. Point forming the north side of the entrance to Brialmont Cove. The present name derives from Cape Charles, first used in about 1831. This name, appearing on early maps in this approximate location, has sometimes been misapplied to the cape at the north side of Hughes Bay.

=== Renzo Point ===
64°13′0″S 61°00′0″W. Spanish: Punta Renzo. A point that is located approximately 1.6 nautical miles (3.0 km; 1.8 mi) north of Charles Point and that constitutes the south limit of the south mouth of Alfaro Strait. Name for Brigadier Renzo de Kartzow da Bove, Chilean Army, who participated in the Chilean Antarctic Expedition of 1954, aboard the patrol boat Lientur of the Chilean Navy.

=== Alcock Island ===
64°14′S 61°08′W. Island lying west of Charles Point in Hughes Bay. The name Penguin Island was used for the feature by whalers operating in the area in 1922. Since this name has not been used on published maps and is a duplication of an earlier name, it has been rejected and a new name substituted. Alcock Island is named for Sir John W. Alcock (1892–1919), who, with Sir Arthur Whitten Brown, made the first nonstop trans-Atlantic flight on June 14–15, 1919.

== Northern features ==
=== Perkos Dome ===
64°14′31″S 60°33′22″W. An ice dome rising to 2,228 metres (7,310 ft) in the west part of the Detroit Plateau. Situated between tributaries to Lilienthal Glacier, Sikorsky Glacier and Breguet Glacier, 7.54 kilometres (4.69 mi) south of Mount Ader. Named after the Thracian god Perkos.

=== Sikorsky Glacier ===
64°12′S 60°53′W. Glacier flowing into Hughes Bay north of Charles Point. Photographed by the Falkland Islands and Dependencies Aerial Survey Expedition (FIDASE) in 1956–57, and mapped from these photos by the FIDS. Named by the UK Antarctic Place-Names Committee (UK-APC) in 1960 for Igor Sikorsky, American (Russian born) aircraft designer, who has pioneered helicopters since 1909.

=== Duarte Cove ===
64°12′00″S 60°57′00″W. Spanish: Ensenada Duarte. An extensive inlet that opens in front of the southeast end of the shore, southwest of Cierva Point. Named after the second Chilean Antarctic Expedition 1949, by Lieutenant Commander José Duarte V. 1st commander of the transport Maipo.

== Southern features ==
=== Trepetlika Glacier ===
64°15′20″S 60°50′50″W. The 8 kilometres (5.0 mi) long and 3.5 kilometres (2.2 mi) wide glacier on the south side of Sonketa Ridge in the west foothills of Detroit Plateau. Drains the northwest slopes of Razhana Buttress, flows westwards and enters Brialmont Cove north of the terminus of Mouillard Glacier. Named after the settlement of Trepetlika in Southeastern Bulgaria.

=== Mouillard Glacier ===
64°18′S 60°53′W. Glacier flowing into the southeast corner of Brialmont Cove, on the west coast of Graham Land. Photographed by the FIDASE in 1956–57, and mapped from these photos by the FIDS. Named by the UK-APC in 1960 for Louis Pierre Mouillard (1834–97), French pioneer of gliding flight.

=== Brialmont Cove ===
64°16′S 61°00′W. A cove in Hughes Bay, lying between Charles Point and Spring Point. Charted in 1898 by the Belgian Antarctic Expedition (BelgAE) under Adrien de Gerlache, who named it for Lieutenant-General Henri Alexis Brialmont, a member of the Belgica Commission.

=== Sprightly Island ===
64°17′S 61°04′W. An island 1 nautical mile (1.9 km; 1.2 mi) northwest of Spring Point in Hughes Bay. First roughly surveyed by the BelgAE (1897–99). Named by UK-APC after the British sealer Sprightly, Captain Hughes, which visited this vicinity in 1824–25.

== Sources ==
- Alberts, Fred G., ed. (1995), Geographic Names of the Antarctic (PDF) (2 ed.), United States Board on Geographic Names This article incorporates public domain material from websites or documents of the United States Board on Geographic Names.

REMA Explorer
The Reference Elevation Model of Antarctica (REMA) gives ice surface measurements of most of the continent. When a feature is ice-covered, the ice surface will differ from the underlying rock surface and will change over time. To see ice surface contours and elevation of a feature as of the last REMA update,
- Open the Antarctic REMA Explorer
- Enter the feature's coordinates in the box at the top left that says "Find address or place", then press enter
  The coordinates should be in DMS format, e.g. 65°05'03"S 64°01'02"W. If you only have degrees and minutes, you may not be able to locate the feature.
- Hover over the icons at the left of the screen
- Find "Hillshade" and click on that
  In the bottom right of the screen, set "Shading Factor" to 0 to get a clearer image
- Find "Contour" and click on that
  In the "Contour properties" box, select Contour Interval = 1m
  You can zoom in and out to see the ice surface contours of the feature and nearby features
- Find "Identify" and click on that
  Click the point where the contour lines seem to indicate the top of the feature
  The "Identify" box will appear to the top left. The Orthometric height is the elevation of the ice surface of the feature at this point.

- Antarctic REMA Explorer (Digital Elevation Models created by the Polar Geospatial Center from Maxar imagery), Polar Geospatial Center, University of Minnesota, 2019
- "Ensenada Duarte", Composite Gazetteer of Antarctica, Scientific Committee on Antarctic Research
- Graham Land and South Shetland Islands, BAS: British Antarctic Survey, 2005
- "Perkos Dome", Composite Gazetteer of Antarctica, Scientific Committee on Antarctic Research
- "Punta Renzo", Composite Gazetteer of Antarctica, Scientific Committee on Antarctic Research
- "Razhana Buttress", Composite Gazetteer of Antarctica, Scientific Committee on Antarctic Research
- "Relyovo Peninsula", Composite Gazetteer of Antarctica, Scientific Committee on Antarctic Research
- "Sonketa Ridge", Composite Gazetteer of Antarctica, Scientific Committee on Antarctic Research
- "Trepetlika Glacier", Composite Gazetteer of Antarctica, Scientific Committee on Antarctic Research
- "Zhelad Saddle", Composite Gazetteer of Antarctica, Scientific Committee on Antarctic Research

This article includes information from the Antarctic Place-names Commission of Bulgaria which is used with permission.
