= Kurt Sterneck =

Austro-German actor and radio play narrator (1919–1998)

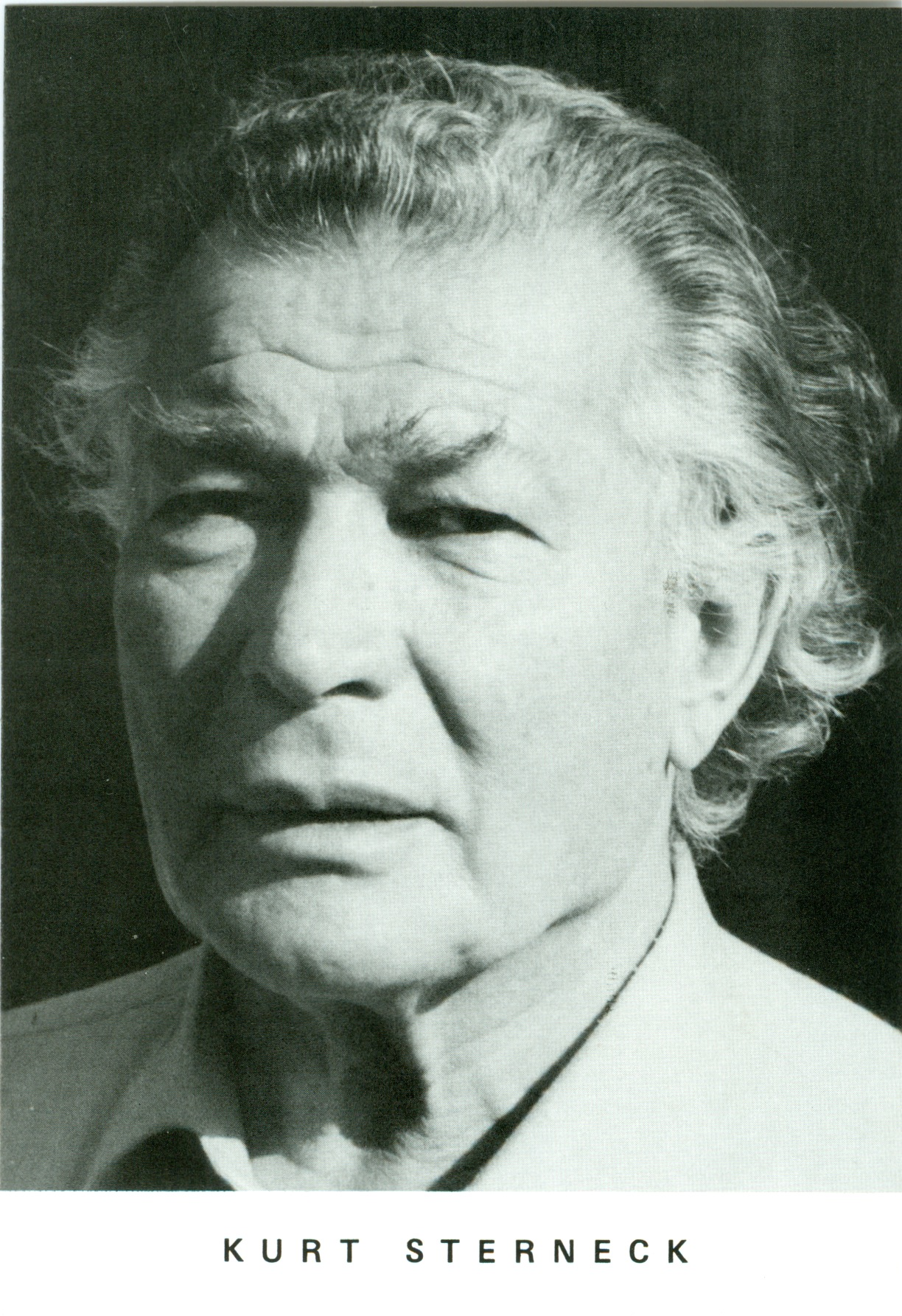

Kurt Julius Sterneck (28 June 1919 – 23 January 1998) was an Austro-German stage and film actor, radio drama narrator and director.

== Life ==
Born in Graz, Sterneck was the son of the opera singer Berthold Sterneck (1887–1943) and his first wife Ernestine Franziska Sterneck, née Schröder. The Jewish father and Catholic mother had converted to Protestantism shortly before the marriage in 1918. As the mother died already in September 1919, her son initially grew up with relatives of his mother in Graz. The father married again in 1922 and took the son to live with him in Munich in 1923.

After passing his Abitur from a Realgymnasium in Munich in 1937, he initially worked as a trainee in preparation for studying engineering. In 1938, Sterneck entered military service and later participated in World War II as a soldier. In 1943, he began studying engineering at the Technical University of Munich. In 1944, he was arrested because of his Jewish origins. After stays in the Dachau concentration camp and a forced labour camp, Sterneck continued his interrupted studies after the end of the war in 1945 and successfully completed them. In addition to his profession as an engineer, he took acting lessons with Anna Zeise-Ernst and Heinz Thiele from 1949.

Sterneck made his debut in Munich in 1951. From autumn 1955, he was a member of the ensemble at the Theater Krefeld und Mönchengladbach. Stints at theatres in Pforzheim, Augsburg, Innsbruck and Tübingen followed. In 1967, he received an engagement at the Schauspielhaus Graz. In 1991, a performance is planned in the Stuttgart Komödie im Marquardt in the play Trautes Heim – nie allein by Anthony Marriott and Bob Grant zu verzeichnen. In the 1993/1994 season, he embodied his last stage role in Hermann Bahr's The Concert at the Komödie im Bayerischen Hof in Munich.

Sterneck took part in several television productions. Among them was the well-known television series Die Fernfahrer on the Süddeutscher Rundfunk (SDR) by Theo Mezger with Rudolf Krieg and Pit Krüger. He took also part in Zeitsperre also directed by Theo Mezger with Horst Niendorf, Hermann Lenschau and Alfons Höckmann and in episodes of the television series Derrick and Die Abenteuer des braven Soldaten Schwejk. He also worked frequently as a radio play narrator and directed several radio dramas. For example, he appeared in Andreas Okopenko's radio drama Johanna.

Sterneck continued to teach at the University of Music and Performing Arts Graz.

Sterneck died in Munich at the age of 78. His gravesite is located at the Waldfriedhof in Munich.

== Filmography ==
- 1963: Die Fernfahrer (TV series) – Frachtbrief Nr. 1012
- 1965: Zeitsperre (TV film)
- 1966: Zehn Prozent (TV film)
- 1967: Blick von der Brücke (TV film)
- 1972–1976: Die Abenteuer des braven Soldaten Schwejk (TV series) – 1 sequel
- 1984: Derrick (TV series) – Angriff aus dem Dunkel

== Radio play ==
=== Narrator ===
- 1961: Spiel auf der Tenne
- 1962: Die einzige Rechnung (Folge aus dem Mehrteiler „Terra Incognita“)
- 1968: Fast eine Reportage
- 1969: Johanna
- 1963: Gesucht wird Jimmy Hardwick
- 1964: Das Fenster
- 1964: Der fahrende Schüler im Paradies
- 1964: Jobal und die vier Reiter
- 1965: Solo für Störtebeker
- 1967: Das gefleckte Band
- 1967: Der Mann mit den zwei Bärten
- 1967: Ein Leben
- 1968: Der Sonntag der braven Leute
- 1968: Geheimakt ADM 20 C auf der Kinderspielwiese (8 sequels)
- 1968: Mord im Erholungsdorf (8 szequels)
- 1968: Alles für Septimius Severus
- 1968: Die Stimme unter der Brücke
- 1968: Hier darf nur geflogen werden
- 1969: Der Große Rindfleisch-Vertrag
- 1969: Korsakow
- 1969: Die Partei der Anständigen
- 1969: Das Mädchen am Fenster
- 1969: Mauer
- 1969: Frau Kröner fährt Taxi
- 1970: Ausbruch
- 1970: Der Käfig
- 1970: Die Rückkehr des Cortez
- 1971: Auslandsgespräch
- 1971: Der Aufstand der Würmer
- 1971: Der Tod der Bessie Smith
- 1971: Die blaue Küste
- 1971: Goll Moll
- 1971: Ferngespräche
- 1971: Die heißen Tage der Gerti Zeiss
- 1972: Beschreibungen
- 1972: Miteinander, Füreinander
- 1972: Johanna oder Ein Familienzwist
- 1973: Das Lächeln der Apostel
- 1973: Der Mann, der seine persönliche Meinung verloren hat
- 1974: Eins, zwei, drei
- 1975: Der schwarze Tod
- 1975: Große Oper für Stanislaw den Schweiger
- 1977: Paß nach Drüben
- 1978: Ein Hund namens Hegel

=== Direction ===
- 1972: Der Pfründner
- 1972: Der Mensch Adam Deigl und die Obrigkeit
- 1973: Menschenkuchen
- 1973: Der Verderber
- 1973: Die Schreibmaschinen
- 1973: Erdbeereis mit Schlagobers
- 1973: Lieferung frei Haus
- 1974: Sprechstunde bei Dr. Weiss
- 1975: Einfach Anna
- 1977: Hecht im Karpfenteich
- 1980: Männlicher gegen Maschine
