= Thomas Cove =

Inlet on the Danco coast of the Falkland Islands

Thomas Cove () is the cove south of Haigh Point, Danco Coast. It was first surveyed by the Falkland Islands Dependencies Survey (FIDS) in 1956–57. The cove was named in association with Haigh Point, by the United Kingdom Antarctic Place-Names Committee (UK-APC) in 1985. It was named after Joan Ena Thomas, who was the personal assistant to the Secretary of the UK-APC Polar Regions Section at the Foreign and Commonwealth Office, from 1948 to 1962.

== Notes ==
64°56′S 63°6′W
