= Haigh Point =

Geographic location

Haigh Point (64°55′S 63°6′W) is a point west of Mount Banck, Danco Coast, Antarctica, forming the northern entrance point of Thomas Cove. It was named by the UK Antarctic Place-Names Committee (UK-APC) in association with Thomas Cove after Dorothy Haigh, Head of the Cartographic Section at the Foreign and Commonwealth Office, 1948–70, with responsibility for preparing UK-APC maps.
