= Cape Murray =

Cape Murray may refer to

- Cape Murray (Oates Land), a cape on the coast of the Conway Range, Antarctica
- Cape Murray (Graham Land), a cape in Hughes Bay, Antarctica
- Cape Murray (Zemlya Georga), or Mys Murray, a cape on Zemlya Georga in Franz Josef Land in the Russian Arctic
