= Cierva Cove =

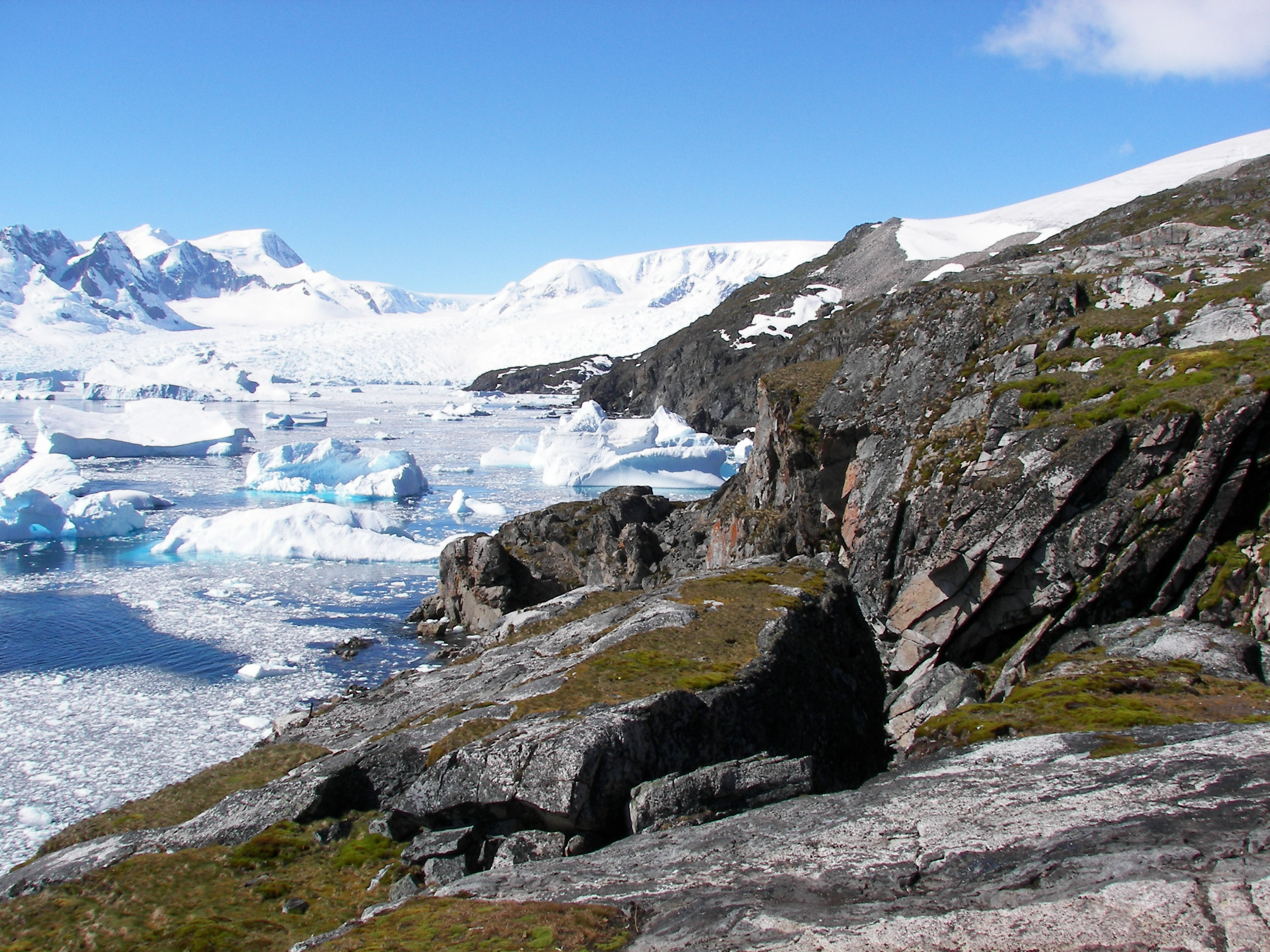
Cierva Cove

Cierva Cove (64°9′S 60°53′W) is a cove lying 6 nautical miles (11 km) southeast of Cape Sterneck in Hughes Bay, just south of Chavdar Peninsula along the west coast of Graham Land, Antarctica. Shown on an Argentine government chart of 1950, it was named by the UK Antarctic Place-Names Committee in 1960 for Juan de la Cierva, the Spanish designer of the autogiro, which was the first successful rotating wing aircraft in 1923.

== Capitán Cobbett Refuge ==
Capitán Cobbett Refuge
- Refuge
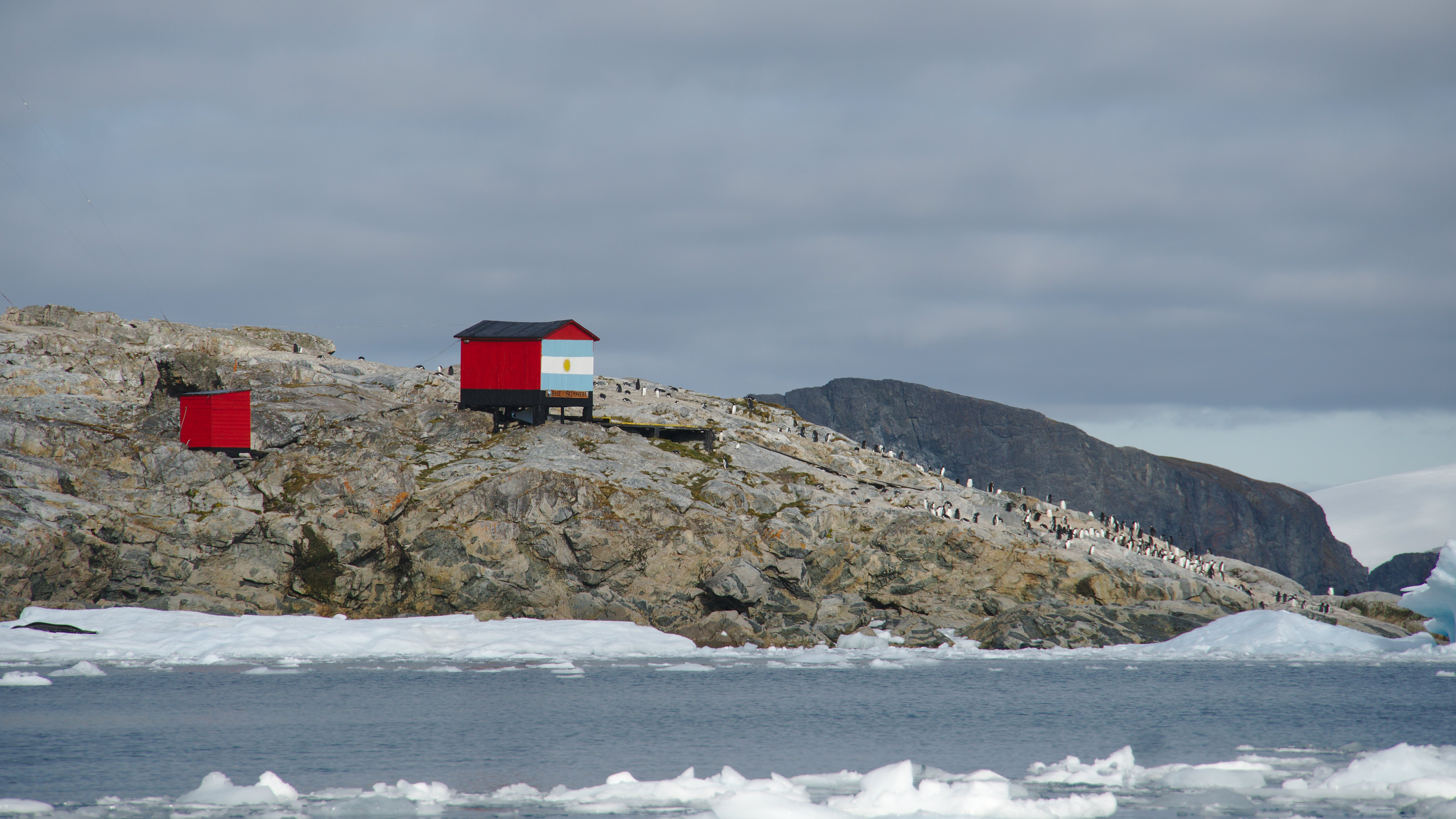

- Location of Capitán Cobbett Refuge in Antarctic Peninsula
- Coordinates: 64°09′21″S 60°57′19″W
- Country: Argentina
- Location in Antarctic Peninsula: Cierva Cove; Graham Land; Antarctica
- Administered by: Argentine Army
- Established: 1954
- Type: Year-round
- Status: Operational

Refuge Capitán Cobbett (64°09′21″S 60°57′19″W) is an Argentine refuge in Antarctica located in Cierva Cove, in the Antarctic Peninsula, on the north access to the Gerlache Strait. The refuge was inaugurated on January 23, 1954, with the name of naval refuge Cape Primavera. The Antarctic Command of the Argentine Army inaugurated, on March 3, 1977, the Primavera Base following the works to the refuge and the construction of new buildings.

The refuge is a small building that currently has the function of a laboratory; it has two rooms and a bathroom, and has supplies for three men for three months. The name pays tribute to Captain Enrique Cobbett, who died in August 1826 in the shipwreck of the frigate Buenos Aires on Cape Horn. The refuge was renovated, in March 2017, by a task force of the transport ship ARA Bahía San Blas.

== See also ==
- List of Antarctic field camps
- South Pole
