= Butrointsi =

Coordinates: 42°51′8″N 22°44′34″E

Butrointsi is a village in the Tran Municipality, Pernik Province in western Bulgaria. It is about 10 km east from the town of Tran.

The village is located at 900 m above sea level. It has only 28 inhabitants as of the last cenus in 2021.

== Honours ==
Butrointsi Point in Antarctica is named after the village.
