= Two Hummock Island =

Island in Palmer Archipelago, Antarctica

- Location of Two Hummock Island

- Location within Antarctic Peninsula Location within Antarctica

Geography
- Location: Antarctica
- Coordinates: 64°8′S 61°42′W
- Archipelago: Palmer Archipelago
- Length: 9.4 km (5.84 mi)
- Width: 5 km (3.1 mi)
- Highest elevation: 670 m (2200 ft)

Administration
- Administered under the Antarctic Treaty System

Demographics
- Population: Uninhabited

Two Hummock Island (64°8′S 61°42′W) is an ice-covered island, 5 nautical miles (9.3 km; 5.8 mi) long in a north–south direction, conspicuous for its two rocky summits 670 metres (2,200 ft) high, lying 5 nautical miles (9.3 km; 5.8 mi) southeast of Liège Island in the Palmer Archipelago.

== Location ==
Two Hummock Island is in the Palmer Archipelago to the west of the Antarctic Peninsula. It is separated from Brabant Island and Liege Island to the west by the Croker Passage. The Christiana Islands are to the north, and Cape Herschel of the Davis Coast is to the east.

== Sailing direction ==
The US Defense Mapping Agency's Sailing Directions for Antarctica (1976) describes Two Hummock Island as follows:

TWO HUMMOCK ISLAND (Two Summit Island) situated about 11 miles west-southwestward of Cape von Sterneok Is about 5 miles long from north to south and half as wide, and about 2,130 feet high. It presents a convex appearance with a smooth snow mantle, through which two pyramidal rocky nunataks project, forming twin summits which are ranged in the direction of the length of the island. The coast line Is formed by Ice cliffs, fronted by narrow strips of bare rook at the water's edge. Cape Wauters. the northern extremity, Is a conspicuous snow cape. Few bare rook promontories appear through the snow covering. Along the coast there are deep crevasses in the ice, so that the cliffs have the appearance of an icefall. The rock of the Island Is gray granite, with thick, regular veins of dark, compact green rock, and also smaller red veins.

Islets and rocks extend over 4 miles off Its northeast coast, the most northern being AUGUSTE ISLAND upon which de Gerlach landed In 1898. It Is about 1 mile long. flat-topped with steep slopes. It Is mostly snow free. A landing may be made on the rocky shore In the northwestern part of the Island. COBALESCOU ISLET, snow free and with two flat rounded summits of broken rooks 84 feet high, on which Is a rookery of penguins and cormorants, lies about 3/4 mile east-southeastward of the southeastern extremity of Two Hummock Island.

== Name ==
The name "Two Hummock Island" has appeared on maps for over 100 years and its usage has become established internationally.

== Features ==
Features, clockwise from the north, include:

=== Wauters Point ===
64°06′S 61°43′W. An ice-covered point forming the north end of Two Hummock Island. Charted by the Belgian Antarctic Expedition (BelgAE), 1897–99, under Adrien de Gerlache, and named by him for Alphonse Wauters, a supporter of the expedition.

=== Kotev Cove ===
64°06′40″S 61°42′00″W A 1.81 kilometres (1.12 mi) wide cove indenting for 1.8 kilometres (1.1 mi) the northeast coast of Two Hummock Island. Entered northwest of Butrointsi Point. Named after Vasil Kotev, commander of motor boats and sledges at St. Kliment Ohridski Base in 2007/08 and subsequent seasons, and base commander during parts of the 2009/10 and 2011/12 seasons.

=== Butrointsi Point ===
64°06′36.6″S 61°40′51″W An ice-free tipped point on the southeast side of the entrance to Kotev Cove. Situated 2.55 kilometres (1.58 mi) southeast of Wauters Point, 7.38 kilometres (4.59 mi) north of Veyka Point, and 31.8 kilometres (19.8 mi) west by south of Cape Sterneck on the Antarctic Peninsula. Named after the settlement of Butrointsi in Western Bulgaria.

=== Modev Peak ===
64°07′46″S 61°42′06″W A mostly ice-covered peak rising to 665 metres (2,182 ft) high on Two Hummock Island. Situated 4.04 kilometres (2.51 mi) south of Wauters Point, 2.38 kilometres (1.48 mi) southwest of Butrointsi Point, 5.35 kilometres (3.32 mi) north-northwest of Veyka Point and 1.63 kilometres (1.01 mi) northeast of Buache Peak. Precipitous and partly ice-free northwest slopes. Overlooking Kotev Cove to the north. Named after Stanimir Modev, mechanic at St. Kliment Ohridski base in 2002/03 and subsequent seasons.

=== Veyka Point ===
64°10′35″S 61°40′45″W An ice-free tipped point on the east side of the entrance to Lesura Cove forming the south extremity of Two Hummock Island. Situated 5.07 kilometres (3.15 mi) southeast of Palaver Point, 9.39 kilometres (5.83 mi) south by east of Wauters Point, and 33.58 kilometres (20.87 mi) west-southwest of Cape Sterneck on the Antarctic Peninsula. Named after Veyka Peak in the Rhodope Mountains, Bulgaria.

=== Lesura Cove ===
64°10′10″S 61°42′20″W A 1.97 kilometres (1.22 mi) wide cove indenting for 1.2 kilometres (0.75 mi) the south coast of Two Hummock Island. Entered west of Veyka Point. Named after the settlement of Lesura in Northwestern Bulgaria.

=== Palaver Point ===
64°09′S 61°45′W. A point on the west side of Two Hummock Island. Photographed by the Falkland Islands and Dependencies Aerial Survey Expedition (FIDASE) in 1955-57. The name arose because the feature is the site of a penguin rookery, with its attendant ceaseless noise resembling the profuse and idle discussion denoted by the word "palaver."

=== Buache Peak ===
64°08′20″S 61°43′38″W A mostly ice-covered peak rising to 595 metres (1,952 ft) high on Two Hummock Island. Situated 1.63 kilometres (1.01 mi) southwest of Modev Peak, 4.8 kilometres (3.0 mi) northwest of Veyka Point and 1.93 kilometres (1.20 mi) northeast of Palaver Point. Precipitous and partly ice-free west-northwest slopes. Named after the French cartographer Philippe Buache (1700-1773) who published maps of the south polar region in 1739 and 1754.

== Nearby islands ==
=== Auguste Island ===
64°03′S 61°37′W. A flat-topped island less than 1 nautical mile (1.9 km; 1.2 mi) long, lying 4 nautical miles (7.4 km; 4.6 mi) northeast of Two Hummock Island in Gerlache Strait. Discovered by the BelgAE (1897–99) under Lieutenant Adrien de Gerlache, and named by him for his father.

=== Lobodon Island ===
64°05′S 61°35′W. Island lying 3.5 nautical miles (6.5 km; 4.0 mi) east of Wauters Point, Two Hummock Island. Photographed by FIDASE in December 1956. Named by the UK-APC in 1960 after Lobodon carcinophagus, the crabeater seal.

=== Hydrurga Rocks ===
64°08′S 61°37′W. Group of rocks lying east of Two Hummock Island. Photographed by the FIDASE, 1955-57. Named by the UK Antarctic Place-Names Committee (UK-APC) in 1960 after Hydrurga leptonyx, the leopard seal.

=== Cobalescou Island ===
64°11′S 61°39′W. Small snow-free island with two rounded summits, lying 1 nautical mile (1.9 km; 1.2 mi) southeast of Two Hummock Island. Discovered and named by the BelgAE under Adrien de Gerlache, 1897-99. The established name appears to be a corrupted spelling. The toponym was suggested to Adrien de Gerlache, by Emil Racoviță, Romanian zoologist and botanist of the BelgAE, for Romanian scholar Grigore Cobălcescu, a geologist of European repute.

== Sources ==
- Alberts, Fred G., ed. (1995), Geographic Names of the Antarctic (PDF) (2 ed.), United States Board on Geographic Names This article incorporates public domain material from websites or documents of the United States Board on Geographic Names.

REMA Explorer
The Reference Elevation Model of Antarctica (REMA) gives ice surface measurements of most of the continent. When a feature is ice-covered, the ice surface will differ from the underlying rock surface and will change over time. To see ice surface contours and elevation of a feature as of the last REMA update,
- Open the Antarctic REMA Explorer
- Enter the feature's coordinates in the box at the top left that says "Find address or place", then press enter
  The coordinates should be in DMS format, e.g. 65°05'03"S 64°01'02"W. If you only have degrees and minutes, you may not be able to locate the feature.
- Hover over the icons at the left of the screen
- Find "Hillshade" and click on that
  In the bottom right of the screen, set "Shading Factor" to 0 to get a clearer image
- Find "Contour" and click on that
  In the "Contour properties" box, select Contour Interval = 1m
  You can zoom in and out to see the ice surface contours of the feature and nearby features
- Find "Identify" and click on that
  Click the point where the contour lines seem to indicate the top of the feature
  The "Identify" box will appear to the top left. The Orthometric height is the elevation of the ice surface of the feature at this point.

- Antarctic REMA Explorer (Digital Elevation Models created by the Polar Geospatial Center from Maxar imagery), Polar Geospatial Center, University of Minnesota, 2019
- "Buache Peak", Composite Gazetteer of Antarctica, Scientific Committee on Antarctic Research
- "Butrointsi Point", Composite Gazetteer of Antarctica, Scientific Committee on Antarctic Research
- Graham Land and South Shetland Islands, BAS: British Antarctic Survey, 2005
- "Kotev Cove", Composite Gazetteer of Antarctica, Scientific Committee on Antarctic Research
- "Lesura Cove", Composite Gazetteer of Antarctica, Scientific Committee on Antarctic Research
- "Modev Peak", Composite Gazetteer of Antarctica, Scientific Committee on Antarctic Research
- Sailing Directions for Antarctica: Includes Islands South of Latitude 60.̊, United States. Defense Mapping Agency. Hydrographic Center, 1976
- "Veyka Point", Composite Gazetteer of Antarctica, Scientific Committee on Antarctic Research
