= Latinka, Kardzhali Province =

Latinka
- Village
- Location within Bulgaria
- Coordinates: 41.583°N 25.133°E
- Country: Bulgaria
- Province: Kardzhali Province
- Municipality: Ardino

Area
  - Total: 10.652 km^{2} (4.113 sq mi)

Population (2007)
  - Total: 22
- Time zone: UTC+2 (EET)
  - Summer (DST): UTC+3 (EEST)

Latinka (Bulgarian: Латинка) is a village in Ardino Municipality, Kardzhali Province, southern-central Bulgaria. It is located 193.336 kilometres (120.133 mi) southeast of Sofia. It covers an area of 10.652 square kilometres and as of 2007 it had a population of 22 people.

== Honours ==
Latinka Cove in Antarctica is named after the village of Latinka.
