= Robert von Sterneck =

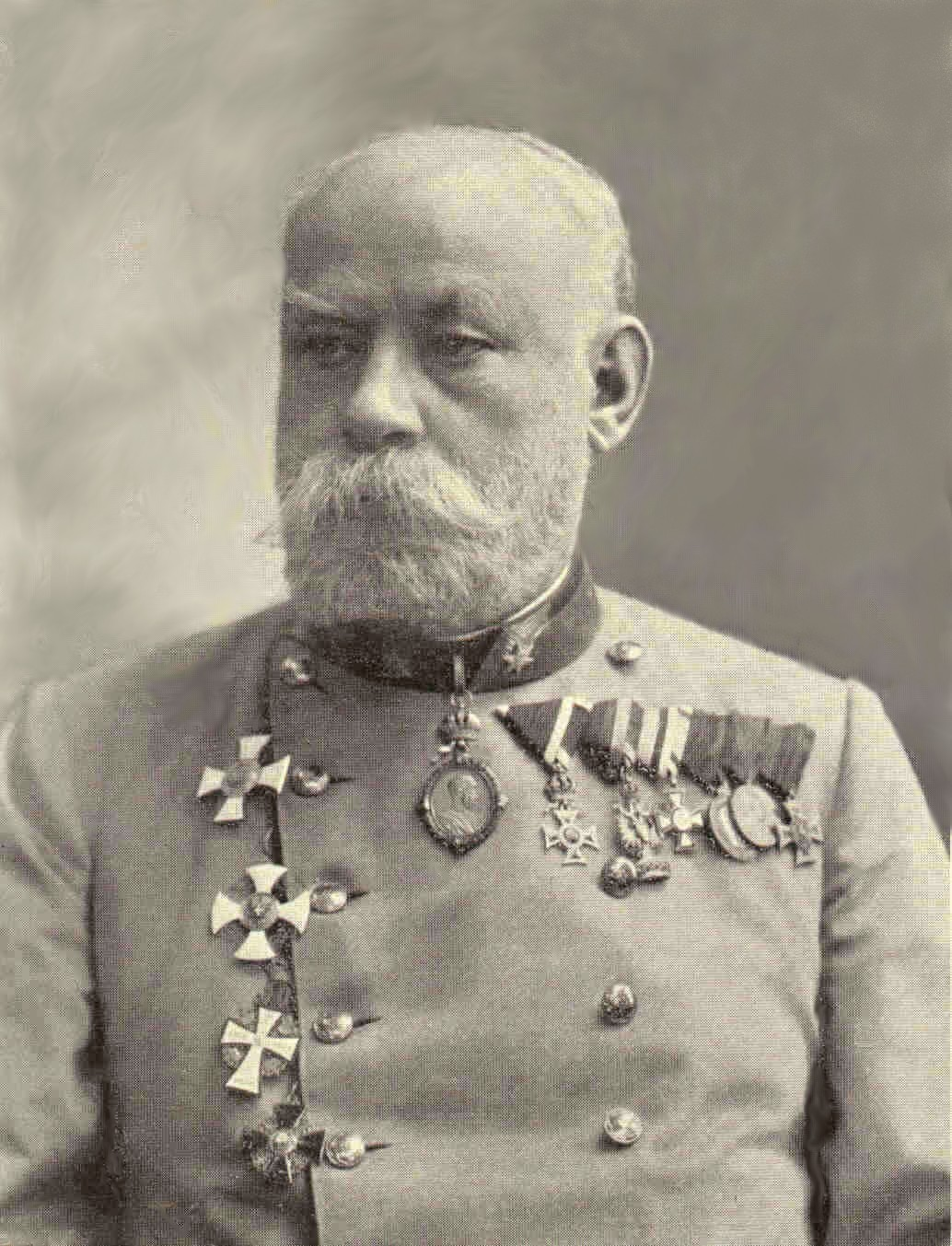
Robert Daublebsky von Sterneck as general major (1910)

Robert von Sterneck (Robert Freiherr Daublebsky von Sterneck the Elder, 1839–1910) was a member of the Budweis Daublebsky von Sterneck baronial family who served as an Austro-Hungarian general major, geophysicist and astronomer. He studied in Prague and entered the Austro-Hungarian Army in 1859, participating in the Magenta und Solferino campaign that year and in the Austro-Prussian War of 1866. From 1862 to 1880, he served head of the astronomical-geodetic section of the military geographic institute in Vienna, and from 1880 to 1902 as the head of the institute's astronomical observatory. He led numerous geodetic missions in the Balkans during the 1870s.

He specialized in measuring gravitational acceleration and the density and interior structure of Earth. Cape Sterneck in Antarctica is named for him. His son, Robert Daublebsky von Sterneck the Younger (1871–1928) was professor of mathematics at Graz.

== Bibliography ==
- "Untersuchungen über die Schwere im Innern der Erde", Mitteilungen des k.u.k. Militärgeographischen Instituts Wien, Band 2, 1882, Band 3, 1883, Band 6, 1886
- "Der neue Pendelapparat des k. u. k. Militärgeographischen Instituts", Mitteilungen des k.u.k. Militärgeographischen Instituts Wien, Band 7, 1887
- "Untersuchungen über den Einfluß der Schwerestörungen auf die Ergebnisse des Nivellements", Mitt. k.u.k. Militärgeogr. Inst., Band 8, 1888, Band 9, 1889
- "Relative Schwerebestimmungen", Mitt. k.u.k. Militärgeogr. Inst., Band 12-14, 1892-1894, Band 17, 1897, Band 21, 1901
- "Der neue Flutmesser in Ragusa", Mitt. k.u.k. Militärgeogr. Inst., Band 22, 1902
- "Die Höhe des Mittelwassers bei Ragusa und die Ebbe und Flut im adriatischen Meere", Mitt. k.u.k. Militärgeogr. Inst., Band 23, 1903
- "Über den Einfluß des Mondes auf die Richtung und Größe der Schwerkraft der Erde", Denkschriften der Akademie der Wissenschaften Wien, Band 73, 1876
- "Über die Änderung der Refraktionskonstante und Störungen der Richtung der Lotlinie im Gebirge", Denkschriften der Akademie der Wissenschaften Wien, Bd. 80, 1879
- "Untersuchungen über den Zusammenhang der Schwere unter der Erdoberfläche mit der Temperatur", Denkschriften der Akademie der Wissenschaften Wien, Band 108, 1899
- "Das Fortschreiten der Flutwelle im adriatischen Meere", Denkschriften der Akademie der Wissenschaften Wien, Band 117, 1908
- "Die Polhöhe und ihre Schwankungen", Mitt. k.u.k. Militärgeogr. Institut, 1893
- "Die Gezeitenerscheinungen in den Adria", Denkschriften der Akademie der Wissenschaften Wien, 1912
