= Schauspielbühnen Stuttgart =

Coordinates: 48°46′47″N 9°10′42″E

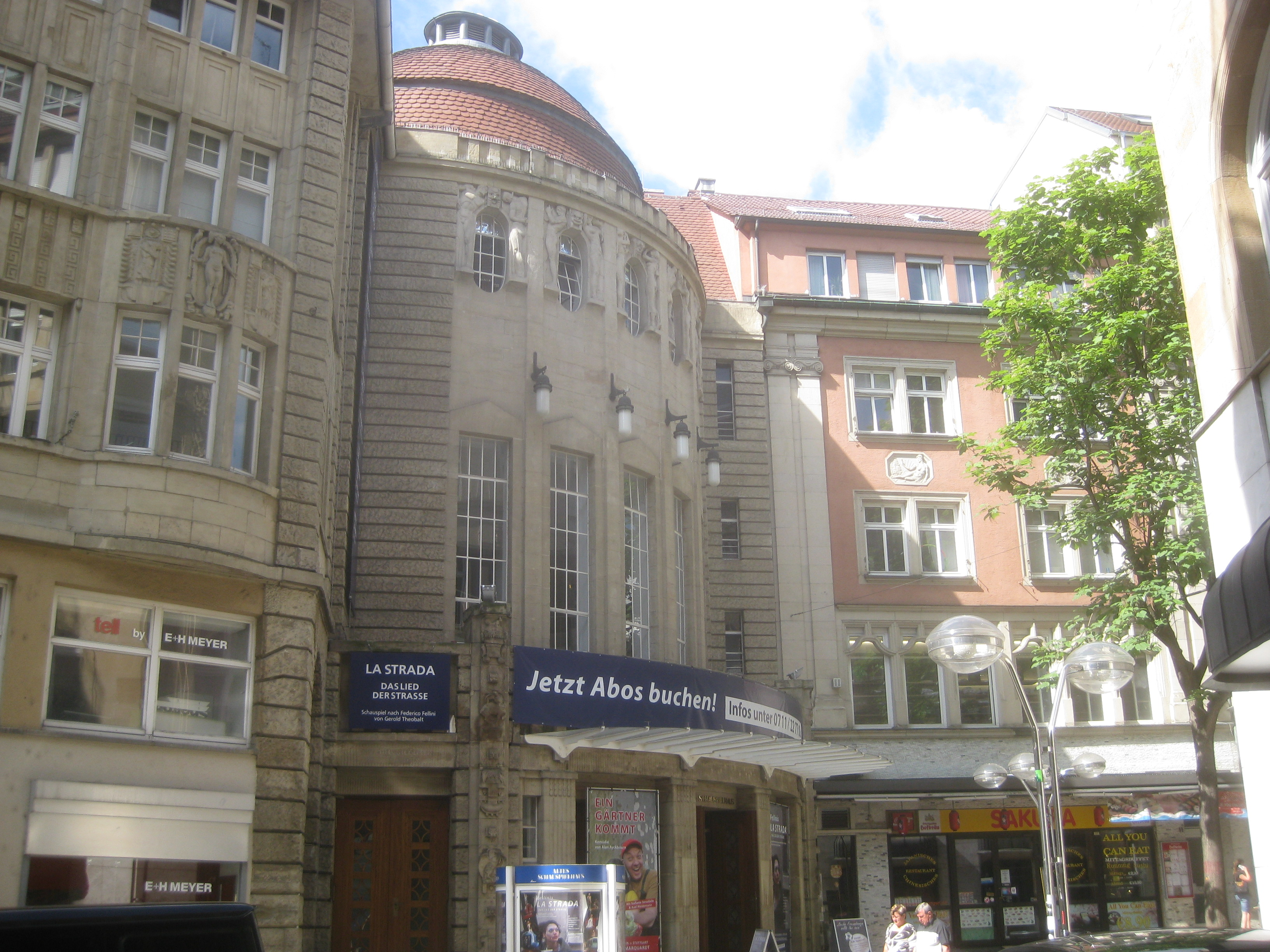
A photo of the (1946-1962) interim stage of the Stuttgart State Theater

Schauspielbühnen Stuttgart is a theatre in Stuttgart, Baden-Württemberg, Germany.
