= Die Fernfahrer =

- Country of origin: Germany

Fernfahrer (title of the DVD edition: Die Fernfahrer) was a German television series in twelve episodes which, in addition to depicting cinematic adventures, is also a portrait of the everyday lives of long-distance lorry drivers in the 1960s.

It was produced by Süddeutscher Rundfunk in black and white for ARD and broadcast on Sunday afternoons in the first programme from 1963 to 1967, with four episodes each in early 1963 and 1964 and in autumn 1967. The length of the individual episodes varied greatly between 30 and 62 minutes. The main actors were Pit Krüger, Rudolf Krieg, Monika Berg, Gernot Duda, Edgar Hoppe and Charlotte Schreiber-Just; guests included Kurt Schmidtchen, Horst Naumann, Kurt Hepperlin, Flory Jacobi, Klaus Höhne, Sigurd Fitzek, Rolf Jahncke, Heinz Schimmelpfennig and Willy Semmelrogge. The film was directed by Theo Mezger.

== See also ==
- List of German television series
