= Chavdar Peninsula =

Peninsula on the Antarctic Peninsula

- Location within Antarctica

Geography
- Location: Gerlache Strait
- Coordinates: 64°05′25″S 60°52′45″W

Chavdar Peninsula (64°05′25″S 60°52′45″W) is a 10 kilometres (6.2 mi) wide peninsula projecting 13 kilometres (8.1 mi) in northwest direction from Graham Land on the Antarctic Peninsula in Antarctica.

== Location ==
Danco Coast, Antarctic Peninsula. Chavdar Peninsula at the northeast end

Chavdar Peninsula lies on the west coast of the Antarctic Peninsula. It is bounded by Curtiss Bay to the northeast, Hughes Bay to the southwest and Gerlache Strait to the northwest. Its west extremity Cape Sterneck separates Danco Coast to the southwest and Davis Coast to the northeast.

== Name ==
Chavdar Peninsula is named for the 16th-century Bulgarian rebel leader Chavdar Voyvoda.

== Features ==
Features and nearby features include:

=== Cape Sterneck ===
64°04′S 61°02′W. A bold, black cliff on a projecting point of land forming the north side of the entrance to Hughes Bay. In 1898, the Belgian Antarctic Expedition (BelgAE) under Lieutenant Adrien de Gerlache explored this area and named this cape for the German geophysicist Robert von Sterneck whose apparatus was used on the expedition. The cape is called Cape Herschel by the British, after Sir John Herschel (1792-1871), British astronomer and member of the Royal Society Committee which prepared instructions for the voyage of Foster's ship HMS Chanticleer, 1828-31.

=== Monument Rocks ===
64°01′S 60°57′W. A group of rocks lying 4 nautical miles (7.4 km; 4.6 mi) northeast of Cape Sterneck in the entrance to Curtiss Bay, northern Graham Land. Roughly charted and given this descriptive name by James Hoseason, First Mate of the sealer Sprightly in 1824.

=== Moreno Rock ===
64°05′S 61°18′W. A rock lying in Gerlache Strait, 7 nautical miles (13 km; 8.1 mi) west-southwest of Cape Sterneck. Named by the BelgAE (1897–99) under Lieutenant Adrien de Gerlache for Argentine scientist and statesman Francisco Moreno.

=== Tumba Ice Cap ===
64°04′50″S 60°55′00″W An ice cap covering the western half of Chavdar Peninsula. Situated west of Samodiva Glacier, and extending 7.7 kilometres (4.8 mi) in E-W direction and 4 kilometres (2.5 mi) in N-S direction. Draining both northwards into Curtiss Bay and southwards into Hughes Bay. British mapping in 1978. Named after the peak of Tumba in Belasitsa Mountain, Southwestern Bulgaria.

=== Samodiva Glacier ===
64°05′30″S 60°49′30″W A 3.7 kilometres (2.3 mi) long and 1.8 kilometres (1.1 mi) wide glacier in the east part of Chavdar Peninsula, draining north-northeastwards east of Mount Pénaud to enter Curtiss Bay west of Seaplane Point. Named after the settlement of Samodiva in Southern Bulgaria.

=== Pirin Glacier ===
64°05′30″S 60°43′00″W A 5.7 kilometres (3.5 mi) long and 6 kilometres (3.7 mi) wide glacier situated next east of Chavdar Peninsula. Draining north-northwestwards to enter the head of Curtiss Bay east of Seaplane Point. Named after Pirin Mountain in Southwestern Bulgaria.

=== Gregory Glacier ===
64°08′S 60°48′W. Glacier flowing into Cierva Cove north of Breguet Glacier, on the west coast of Graham Land. Shown on an Argentine government chart of 1957. Named by the UK-APC in 1960 for H. Franklin Gregory, American pioneer in the development and use of helicopters.

=== Mount Pénaud ===
64°06′00″S 60°52′00″W A mountain rising to about 1,050 metres (3,440 ft) east-southeast of Cape Herschel, Danco Coast, was roughly charted by Henry Foster in January 1829 and called Mount Herschel after Sir John Herschel (see #Cape Sterneck). The mountain was photographed from the air by FIDASE, 1956-57. In association with the names of pioneers of aviation grouped in this area, named Mount Pénaud after Alphonse Pénaud (1850–80), French aircraft designer, 1871–80.

=== Kaliva Range ===
64°08′20″S 60°40′30″W A mostly ice-covered range extending 24.7 kilometres (15.3 mi) in SE-NW direction and 10 kilometres (6.2 mi) wide, rising to 1,771 metres (5,810 ft) high in the northwest foothills of Detroit Plateau and partly on Chavdar Peninsula, on the border between Davis Coast and Danco Coast in Graham Land. Connected to Perkos Dome to the southeast by Sinitovo Gap. Surmounts Breguet Glacier to the south, Gregory Glacier to the southwest, Tumba Ice Cap, Samodiva Glacier and Pirin Glacier to the north, and Wright Ice Piedmont to the northeast. Named after the ancient fortress of Kaliva in Southeastern Bulgaria.

== Sources ==
- Alberts, Fred G., ed. (1995), Geographic Names of the Antarctic (PDF) (2 ed.), United States Board on Geographic Names This article incorporates public domain material from websites or documents of the United States Board on Geographic Names.

REMA Explorer
The Reference Elevation Model of Antarctica (REMA) gives ice surface measurements of most of the continent. When a feature is ice-covered, the ice surface will differ from the underlying rock surface and will change over time. To see ice surface contours and elevation of a feature as of the last REMA update,
- Open the Antarctic REMA Explorer
- Enter the feature's coordinates in the box at the top left that says "Find address or place", then press enter
  The coordinates should be in DMS format, e.g. 65°05'03"S 64°01'02"W. If you only have degrees and minutes, you may not be able to locate the feature.
- Hover over the icons at the left of the screen
- Find "Hillshade" and click on that
  In the bottom right of the screen, set "Shading Factor" to 0 to get a clearer image
- Find "Contour" and click on that
  In the "Contour properties" box, select Contour Interval = 1m
  You can zoom in and out to see the ice surface contours of the feature and nearby features
- Find "Identify" and click on that
  Click the point where the contour lines seem to indicate the top of the feature
  The "Identify" box will appear to the top left. The Orthometric height is the elevation of the ice surface of the feature at this point.

- Antarctic REMA Explorer (Digital Elevation Models created by the Polar Geospatial Center from Maxar imagery), Polar Geospatial Center, University of Minnesota, 2019
- "Cape Herschel", Composite Gazetteer of Antarctica, Scientific Committee on Antarctic Research
- "Chavdar Peninsula", Composite Gazetteer of Antarctica, Scientific Committee on Antarctic Research
- Graham Land and South Shetland Islands, BAS: British Antarctic Survey, 2005
- "Kaliva Range", Composite Gazetteer of Antarctica, Scientific Committee on Antarctic Research
- "Mount Pénaud", Composite Gazetteer of Antarctica, Scientific Committee on Antarctic Research
- "Pirin Glacier", Composite Gazetteer of Antarctica, Scientific Committee on Antarctic Research
- "Samodiva Glacier", Composite Gazetteer of Antarctica, Scientific Committee on Antarctic Research
- "Tumba Ice Cap", Composite Gazetteer of Antarctica, Scientific Committee on Antarctic Research

This article includes information from the Antarctic Place-names Commission of Bulgaria which is used with permission.
