= Berthold Sterneck =

Austrian operatic bass (1887–1943)

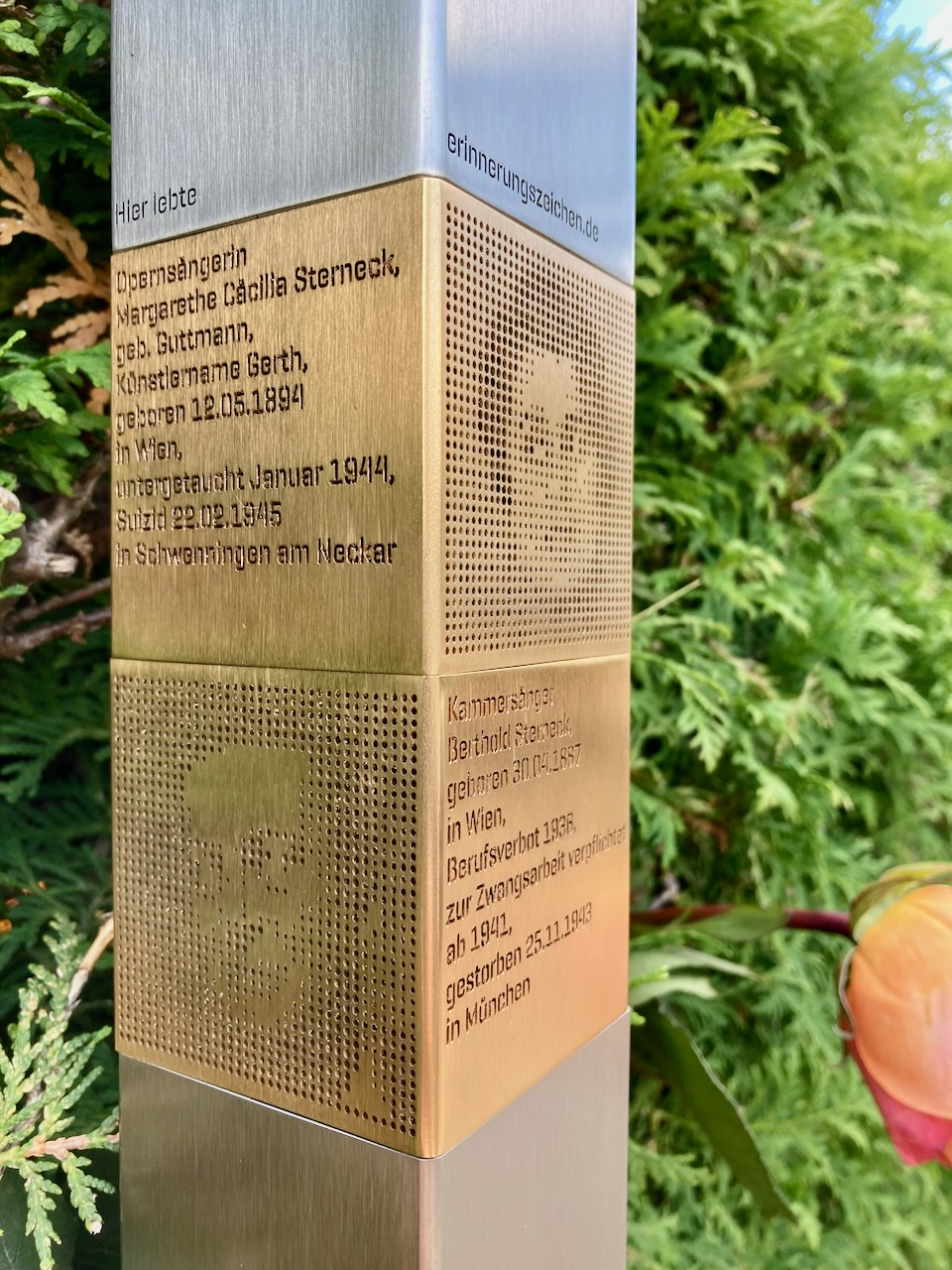
Reminder Berthold und Margarethe Sterneck

Berthold Sterneck, born Berthold Stern (30 April 1887 – 25 November 1943) was an Austrian operatic bass. Sterneck was considered one of the most outstanding bass singers in the German-speaking world and celebrated international success. After 1933, Sterneck and his family became victims of the Holocaust in Nazi Germany.

== First steps (1906-1916) ==
Stern was born in Vienna, the son of Ignaz Stern and Jeanette Stern (née Jeanette Loser). Since an engagement at the municipal theatre in Žatec in 1913, the stage name "Berthold Sterneck" is documented for Berthold Stern. From 1927, the stage name also became an official family name.

Sterneck was a pupil at the k.k. Staatsgymnasium in Hernals, 17th district of Vienna. He passed the Matura there around 1906. In the following years, he first gained experience as an actor at various provincial theatres and also took private singing lessons for several years.

In 1906, the year of his Matura examination, there is evidence of an engagement at the Belle-Alliance-Theater in Berlin, for 1907 appearances at theatres in Nuremberg and Fürth. From October 1908 to September 1911, his career was interrupted by Präsenzdienst in the Austrian army. After stints at the Johann Strauss Theater in Vienna (1911/12), where Sterneck sang in the chorus, and at municipal theatres in Saaz (1913) and Cheb (1913/14), he took part in the First World War; from 1914 to 1916 he was a soldier with the rank of sergeant in the Austrian Army of the 4th Infantry Regiment "Hoch- und Deutschmeister".

== Engagement in Graz (1916–1920) ==
From 1916 to 1920, Sterneck's first continuous engagement as an opera singer followed at the Graz Opera, where he debuted on 6 April 1916 in Otto Nicolai's The Merry Wives of Windsor as "Sir John Falstaff". At the Graz opera, Stern met the singer Ernestine Franziska Schröder (1893-1919), whom he married on 30 December 1918 in the Protestant Heilandskirche in Graz; shortly before, both had converted to Protestantism, Stern himself from the Jewish Community, his wife from Catholicism. Ernestine Stern died on 19 November 1919, shortly after the birth of her son Kurt on 28 June 1919. The son came temporarily to live with relatives of his mother.

Sterneck became best known in Graz as a Wagner singer, but also sang many other works, in total in over 60 different opera productions. When he gave his farewell performance in 1920, he was enthusiastically celebrated by the audience, according to contemporary press reports.

== Successes in Prague and Munich (1920–1933) ==
From Graz, Sterneck moved to the Státní opera Praha in Prague, where he was engaged from 1920 to 1923. Once again he excelled in particular as an interpreter of Wagner, but was also successful as a soloist in concerts. However, his parade role due to his performing talent became his singing part in the comic role of "Baron Ochs auf Lerchenau" in Richard Strauss' Der Rosenkavalier. In Prague, Sterneck also met his second wife, the Viennese opera singer Margarethe Cäcilia Gutmann (1894–1945; stage name: "Margarethe Gerth"), who like himself had converted from the Jewish faith to Protestantism before their marriage on 14 October 1922.

When Stern moved to Munich in 1923 to work at the Bavarian State Opera, the couple took Stern's son from his first marriage to live with them. Their daughter Johanna was born on 2 November 1923. In the following years, the singer reached the peak of his artistic success. Apart from the permanent engagement at the Staatsoper with roles in at least 32 opera productions between 1923 and 1936, Sterneck gave many guest performances at major European stages, for example in Amsterdam in 1926 and 1934, at the Vienna State Opera in 1931, 1936 and 1938, at London's Covent Garden Opera in 1934, as well as at other stages in Switzerland, France and Italy. At the 1935 Salzburg Festival edition, he sang Osmin in Mozart's Die Entführung aus dem Serail. Sterneck's fame in the German-speaking world was also enhanced by numerous radio broadcasts of his opera performances.

== Destruction of existence (1933–1943) ==
From the beginning of the Nazi era in 1933, the family was subjected to multiple repressions due to their original Jewish religious affiliation. Sterneck was nevertheless able to remain a singer at the State Opera for the time being, as he still had Austrian citizenship and the opera's artistic director, Hans Knappertsbusch, stood up for him. However, in a letter dated 14 January 1936, the General Directorate of the Bavarian State Theatres informed Sterneck that due to his Jewish descent, his contract would not be renewed from 31 August 1936. In a letter dated 25 February 1937, the Reichstheaterkammer expelled him. After his last guest performances abroad, Sterneck had to sell his house in Pasing in 1938 and perform forced labour in the construction of warehouses and in a synthetic resin press shop.

On 1 March 1943, Berthold and Margarethe Sterneck received the deportation notification ("Outward migration") and her assets were confiscated. Although the medical treatment of Jews was already forbidden, Sterneck was treated for a cancer in the Nymphenburger Krankenhaus. He died there on 25 November 1943 at the age of 56. His grave is located at the Neuer Israelitischer Friedhof. His wife received another deportation order on 7 January 1944, but was able to escape. After a one-year odyssey through Germany and Austria, she took her own life at her last place of refuge in Schwenningen on 25 February 1945.

Sterneck's daughter Johanna was rescued in 1939 with a Kindertransport to London. The son from his first marriage, Kurt Sterneck, became a soldier in 1938 and was in the war effort until 1943. Because of his Jewish ancestry, he was arrested in 1944 and deported to the Dachau concentration camp under Protective custody from 4 October to 9 November. On 17 January 1945, he was deported to the forced labour camp Wolmirsleben, where he survived until liberation.

== Memory ==
In July 2022, as part of the Memorials for Victims of the Nazi Regime in Munich project, a memorial stele was erected at Presselweg 1 (then Richthofenstrasse 1) for Berthold and Margarethe Sterneck. From 1930 he lived with his family in a villa that had to make way for a bigger building. He was the owner of the villa. In 1938 he had to sell his house.
