= Base Primavera =

Primavera Base Base Primavera Estación Primavera
- Antarctic base
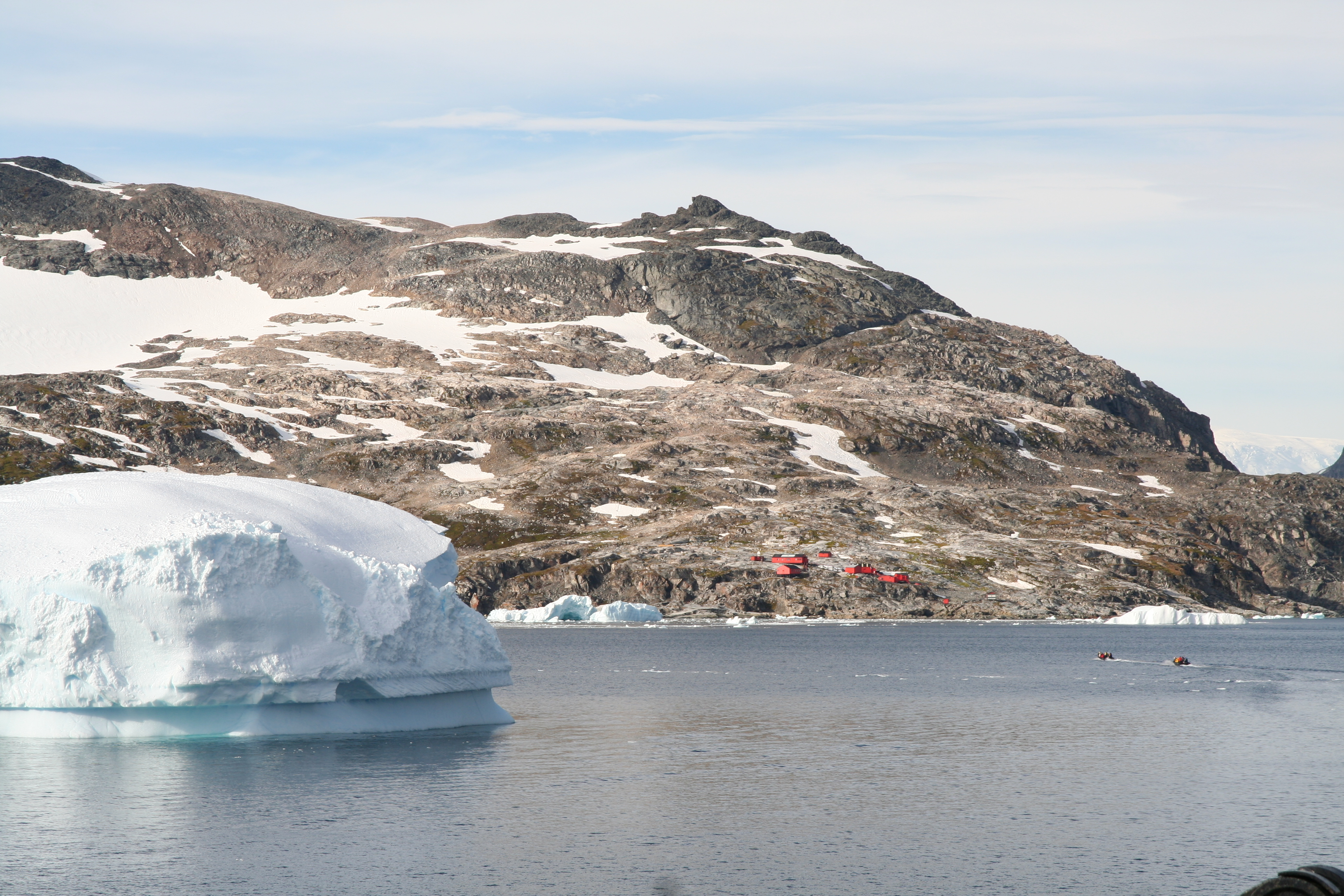
- View of Primavera, austral summer of 2010

- Location within Antarctica
- Coordinates: 64°09′21″S 60°57′19″W
- Country: Argentina
- Province: Tierra del Fuego, Antarctica, and South Atlantic Islands Province
- Department: Antártida Argentina
- Region: San Martín Land; Antarctic Peninsula
- Location: Primavera Cape; Cierva Cove; Danco Coast
- Settled: March 3, 1977 (1976–77 austral summer season)
- Named for: Spanish: Cabo Primavera ("Spring Cape")

Government
  - Type: Directorate
  - Body: Dirección Nacional del Antártico
  - Operator: Instituto Antártico Argentino
- Elevation: 50 m (160 ft)

Population (2017)
  - Summer: 18
  - Winter: 0
- Time zone: UTC-3 (ART)
- Type: Seasonal
- Period: Summer
- Status: Operational
- Activities: List: Marine biology; Climatology; Ecology
- Facilities: List: Main house; Dining room; Heliport; Infirmary; Radio station; Vehicle fleet; Laboratory; Workshop (mechanical, carpentry); Freezing chamber; Deposits

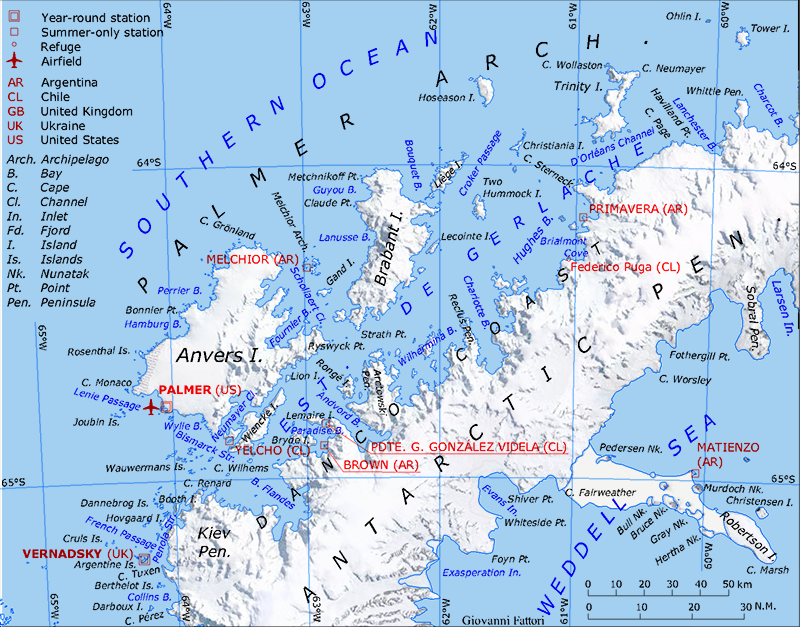
Map of Gerlache Strait region, Cartographic base: Antarctic Digital Database www.add.scar.org/

Primavera Base (Spanish: Base Primavera or sometimes Estación Primavera) is an Argentine Antarctic base and scientific research station. It is located on Primavera Cape (next to Cierva Cove) on San Martín Land, Antarctic Peninsula.

As of 2014 Primavera is one of 13 research bases in Antarctica operated by Argentina. From 1977 to 1982 it served as a permanent base; since then it is open during the summer season only.

== History ==
On 23 January 1954, Argentine Navy personnel inaugurated the Capitán Cobbett Naval Refuge on a rocky promontory on Primavera Cape, along the southwestern coast of Cierva Cove in the north access to the Gerlache Strait. Over many years this building was used by Argentine exploration expeditions to the area.

On 3 March 1977, seeking to strengthen the Argentine sovereign presence over Antarctica and specifically, the expansion of scientific studies on the west coast of the Antarctic Peninsula, a task force of the Argentine Army settled in Primavera Cape.

Lieutenant Colonel Ignacio Carro and eight men under his command expanded the Capitán Cobbett refuge, setting up all the facilities needed to support the Argentine Antarctic Institute–commissioned scientists. Such buildings included two small houses, a basic bathroom and a deposit. A freezing chamber, two shelters, power plant and radio station were added later. As a secondary mission the small expedition carried out detailed meteorological and glaciological observations.

Since 1982 the base is activated only during the austral summer campaigns.

== Description ==
Formed by a large granite massif, the steep promontory where Primavera lies on benefits from a microclimate that favors both human activity and the development of rich flora and fauna:

- On ice-free places, lichens, mosses and some small grasses grow in layers.
- Ninety percent of all Antarctic animal species can be spotted in the bay, among them:
  - A wide variety of large cetaceans (blue, finned, southern right, orcas, sperm whales, etc.)
  - A wide variety of pinnipeds (fur, crab-eater, leopard, elephant, Weddell seals, etc.)
  - Many different large sea birds (petrels, skuas, gulls, terns, Antarctic pigeons, cormorants, etc.)

The base is located within a Site of Special Scientific Interest (SSSI) as designated by the Scientific Committee on Antarctic Research (SCAR).

As of 2014 Primavera is only inhabited during summer, and has 11 buildings for housing a maximum of 18 people, a crew usually made up by a staff of 6 Argentine scientists, 4 invited foreign ones and 7 army personnel. Some of the base's critical facilities are the main house, dining room, heliport, infirmary, power plant, vehicle fleet, laboratory, workshop (mechanical, carpentry) and deposits. The heliport is only usable during summer.

The main activities at the base are centered on area logistics; general maintenance of domestic buildings, neighboring shelters, and search and rescue capabilities; support for scientific activities, medical and meteorological expeditions, nearby bases, and ships and aircraft, both local and foreign.

=== Scientific activities ===
Some of the scientific research programs locally carried out include limnology, ornithology, study of mosses and lichen species and their ecological impact.

== Climate ==
Owing to the mild microclimate within the bay, the maximum and minimum temperatures range between the relatively moderate 13 °C (55 °F) and −20 °C (−4 °F). Similarly, recorded wind speeds average 45 km/h (28 mph) blowing mostly from the northwest.

== See also ==
- Argentine Antarctica
- Research stations in Antarctica
- List of Antarctic field camps
