= Herbert Plateau =

Plateau in Antarctica

Herbert Plateau (64°32′S 61°15′W) is a portion of the central plateau of Graham Land, Antarctica, lying between Blériot Glacier and Drygalski Glacier. It borders Foster Plateau on the south and Detroit Plateau on the north. The feature was photographed by the Falkland Islands and Dependencies Aerial Survey Expedition in 1956–57 and mapped from these photos by the Falkland Islands Dependencies Survey (FIDS). It was named by the UK Antarctic Place-Names Committee in 1960 for Walter W. Herbert, a FIDS assistant surveyor at the Hope Bay station in 1956 and 1957.
