= Danco Coast =

Coast in the Antarctic Peninsula

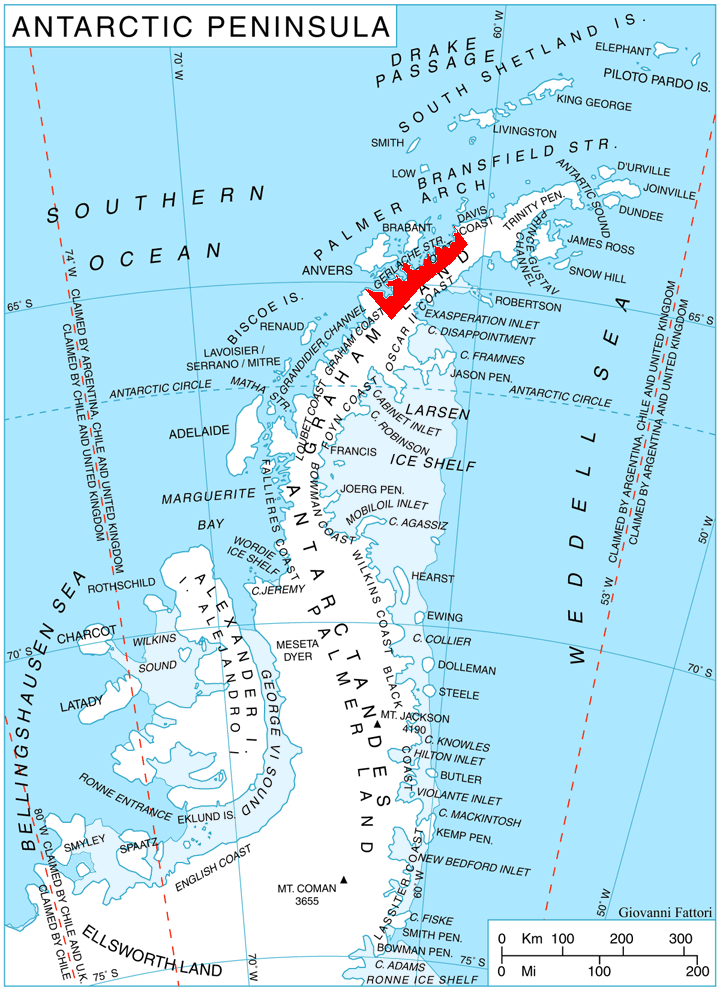
Location of Danco Coast on Antarctic Peninsula.

The Danco Coast (64°42′S 62°0′W) is the portion of the west coast of the Antarctic Peninsula between Cape Sterneck and Cape Renard. This coast was explored in January and February 1898 by the Belgian Antarctic Expedition under Adrien de Gerlache, who named it for Lieutenant Emile Danco who died on the expedition.

The coast is bordered by the Aguirre Passage which separates it from Lemaire Island.

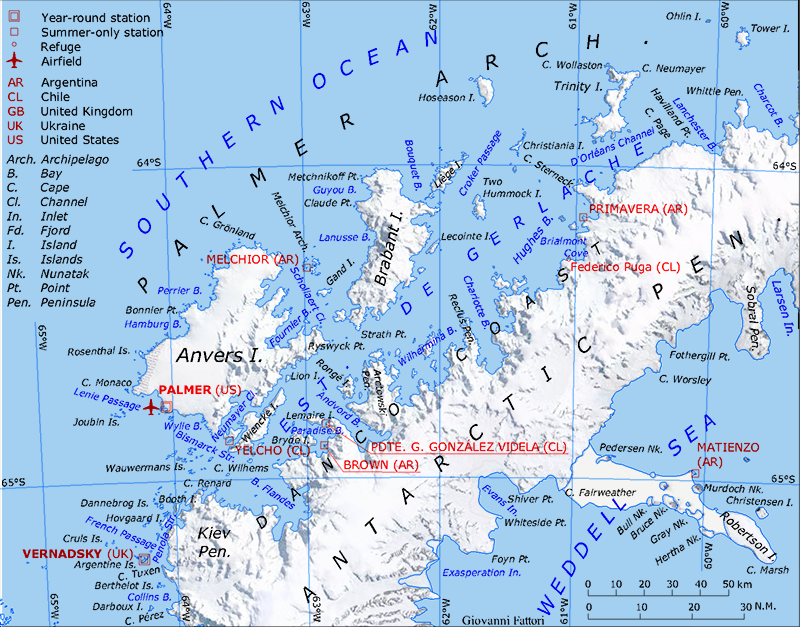
Map of Danco Coast, Cartographic base: Antarctic Digital Database www.add.scar.org/

== Places on the Danco Coast ==
- Brabazon Point
- Salvesen Cove

== Geology ==
The Danco Coast Tectonic Block includes the Upper Permian-Triassic Trinity Peninsula Group, consisting of over 1000 m of metaturbidites folded during the Gondwanide orogeny. This group is overlain by the Lower Cretaceous Antarctic Peninsula Volcanic Group, with up to 2000 m of basaltic and andesitic lavas, tuffs and agglomerates, which were folded and faulted during the Tertiary. These two groups were intruded by the Berriasian-Cenomanian granite and gabbro sills of the Andean Instrusive Suite. A system of hypabbysal dykes intruded during the Late Cretaceous or Tertiary.

== See also ==
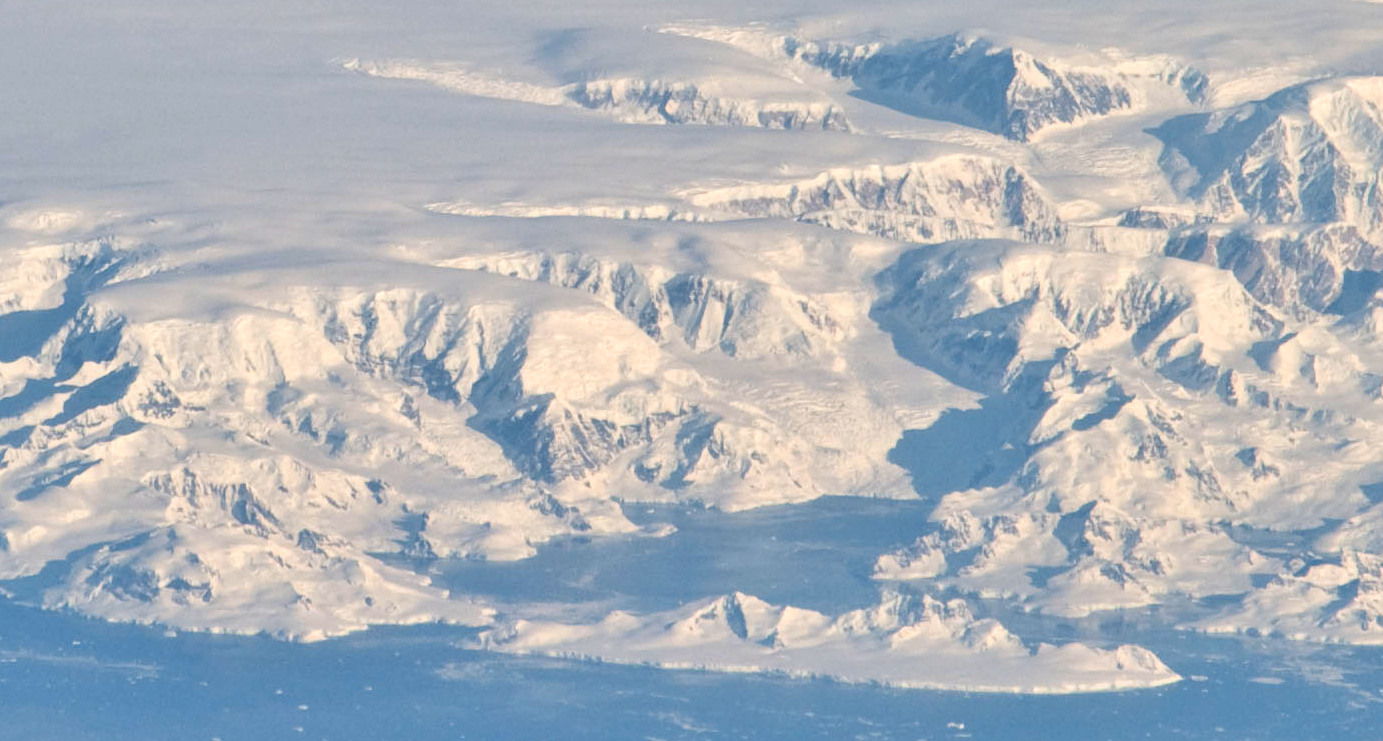
Danco Coast above of Paradise Harbour and Lemaire Island

- Gerlache Strait Geology
- Mount Frödin
