= Gerlache Strait =

Strait in the Palmer Archipelago, Antarctica

Coordinates: 64°30′S 62°20′W

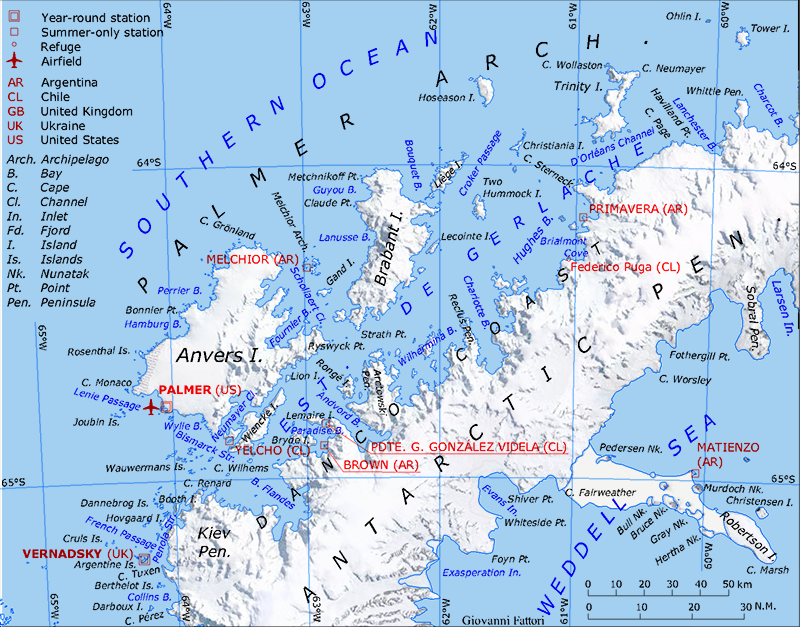
Map of Gerlache Strait region, Cartographic base: Antarctic Digital Database www.add.scar.org/

Gerlache Strait or de Gerlache Strait or Détroit de la Belgica is a channel/strait separating the Palmer Archipelago from the Antarctic Peninsula. The Belgian Antarctic Expedition, under Lt. Adrien de Gerlache, explored the strait in January and February 1898, naming it for the expedition ship Belgica. The name was later changed to honor the commander himself.

On the expedition in the Gerlache Strait, biologist Emil Racoviță made several discoveries, including a flightless midge fly that was later (1900) formally named Belgica antarctica by the Belgian entomologist Jean-Charles Jacobs.

The Gerlache Strait has spiky blue icebergs, and is frequented by whales. It can be viewed from Spigot Peak.

== Geology ==
Four tectonic blocks are identifiable in the Gerlache Strait area, bounded by two systems of Tertiary strike-slip faults. The longitudinal faults include the SW-NE trending Neumayer Fault that extends from Peltier Channel across Wiencke Island, and then onwards most likely as the Gerlache Fault. The SW-NE trending Fournier Fault parallels the Gerlache Fault and divides Anvers Island. The transverse faults trend E-W and SE-NW across Wiencke Island and Brabant Island, and include the Schollaert Channel faults. The Danco Coast Block extends from Cape Willems to Wilhelmina Bay. The Brabant Island Block encompasses the southern portion of that island. The Neumayer Channel Block is bound by the Neumayer Fault and the Fournier Fault. The Anvers-Melchior Islands Block includes northwest Anvers Island and its offshore islands Melchior Islands.

== History ==
In 1934, polar explorer Lincoln Ellsworth reported in the New York Times that a heavy snowstorm and ice made it necessary to change his plan for going from De Gerlache Strait out to sea and south to Adelaide Island. In 1979, four American adventurers survived a two-month expedition to Antarctica. The Washington Post reported that the most dangerous part of their journey was crossing the Gerlache Straight on a raft.

The writer Dianne Ackerman said she went to Gerlache Strait in the 1990s in order to find inspiration for writing prose.

In 2002, Lynne Cox became the first person to swim a mile in the near-freezing Antarctic Ocean. She did the swim in Gerlache Strait. In 2021, a couple on a ship in the Gerlache Straight captured footage of a gentoo penguin narrowly escaping a few hungry killer whales.

== Ecology ==
The Gerlache Strait is known to have high abundances of Humpback whale (Megaptera novaengliae) in the austral summer months. Where there are dense swarms on Antarctic krill (Euphausia superba), attracting large aggregations of migrating cetaceans.

== Gallery ==
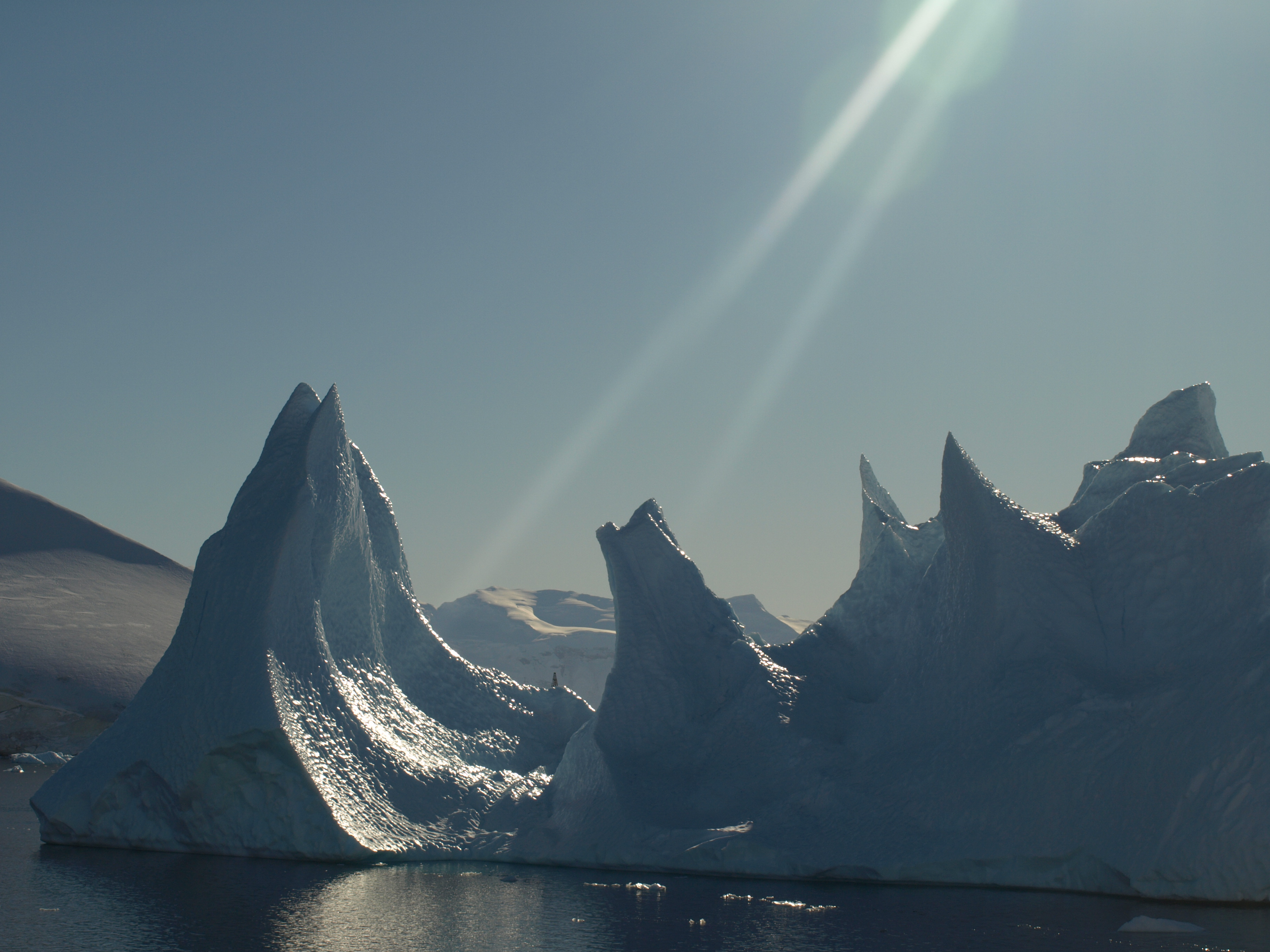
Iceberg in the Gerlache

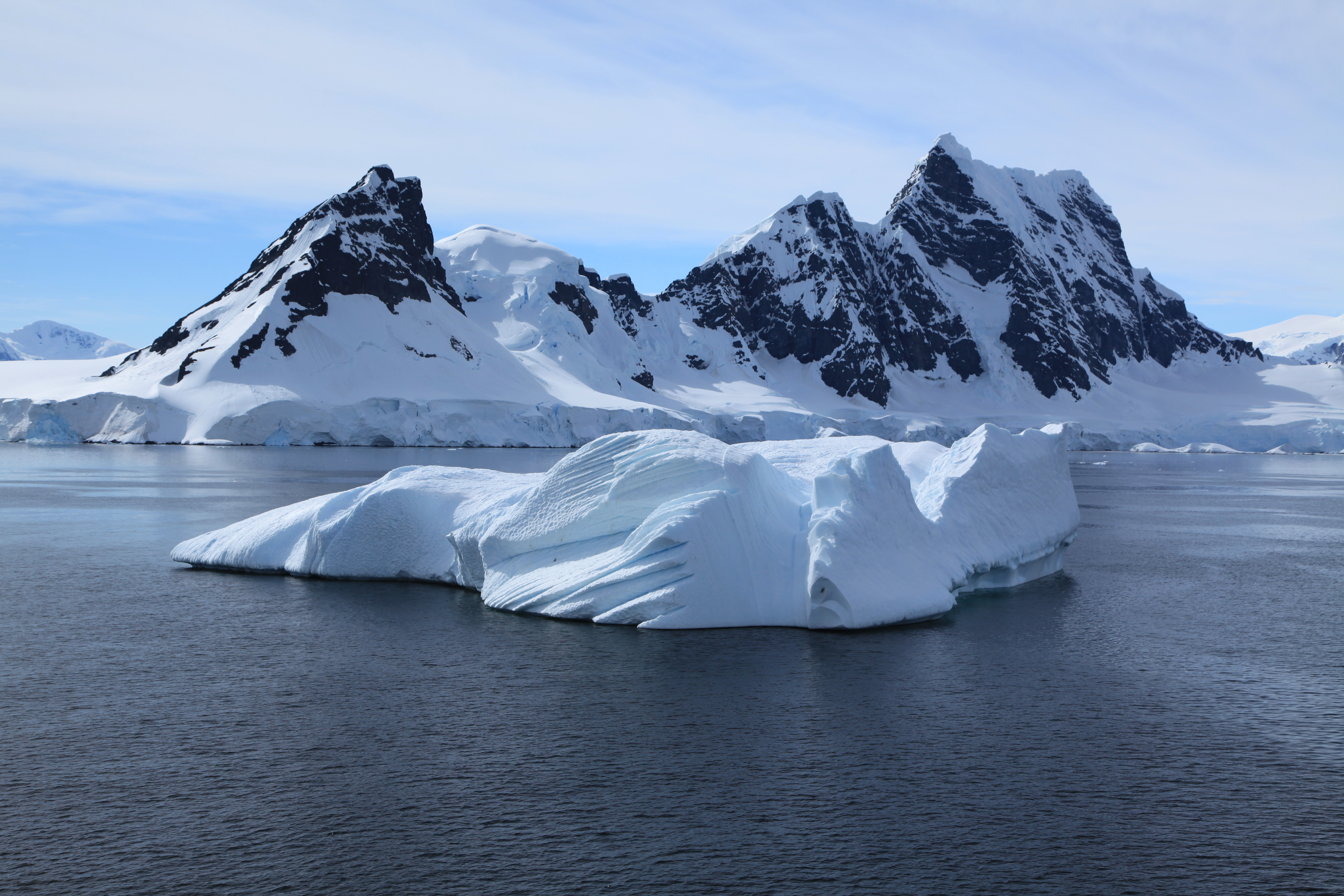
Iceberg

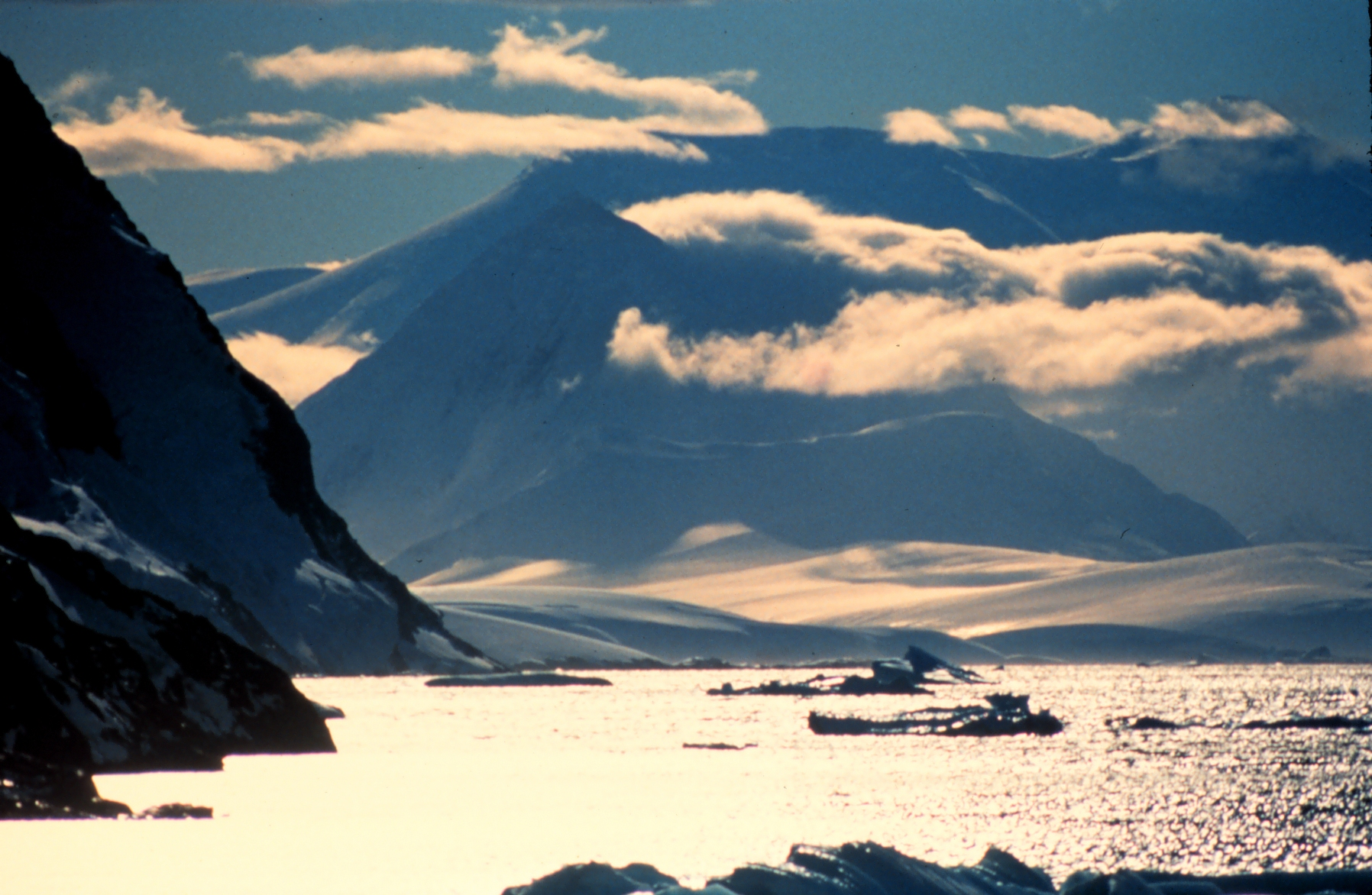
Gerlache Strait

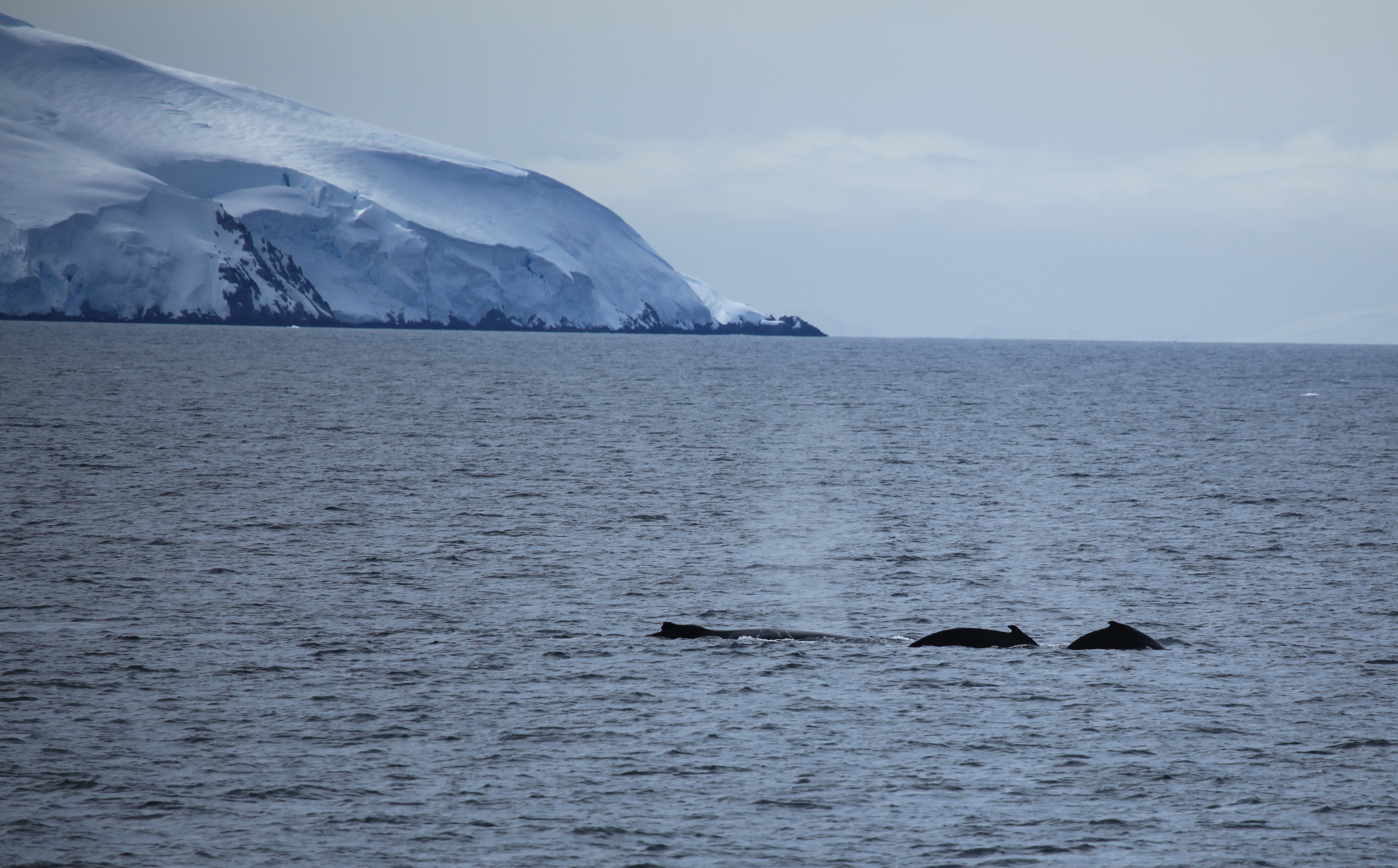
Humpback whales in the strait

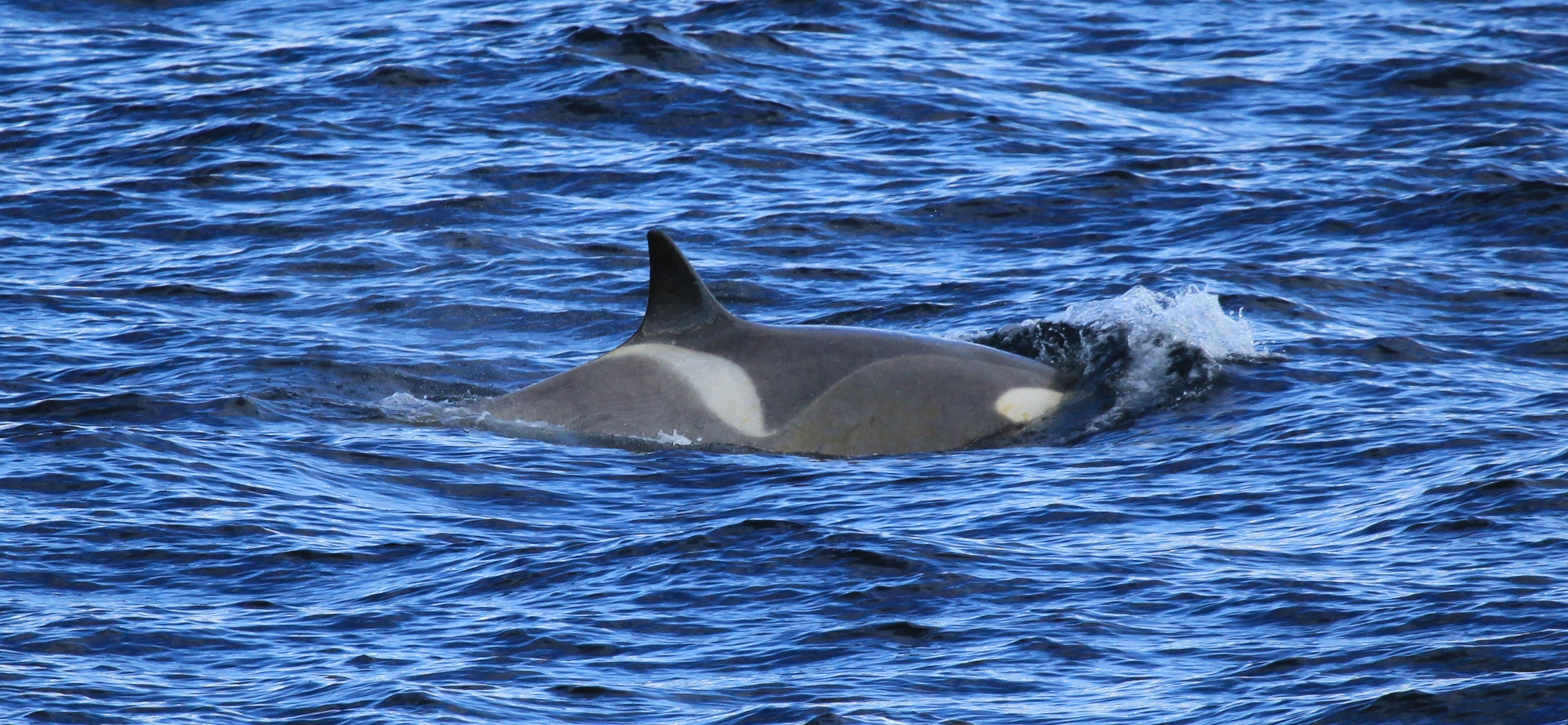
Killer whale swimming
