= Mitkaloto Peak =

Mountain in Graham Land, Antarctica

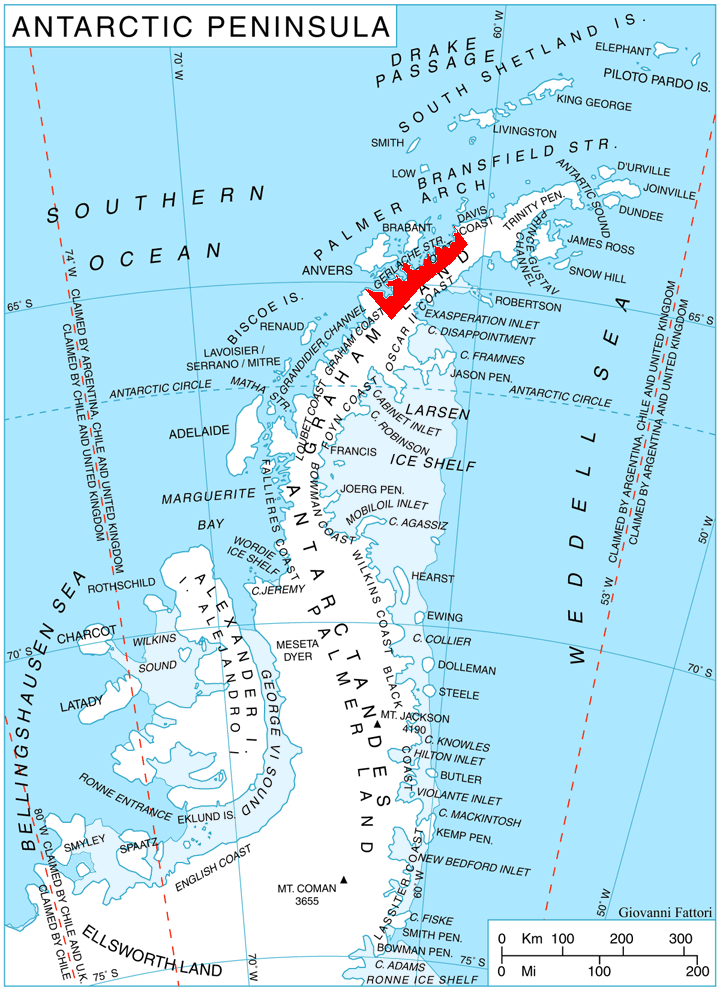
Location of Danco Coast.

Mitkaloto Peak (Bulgarian: връх Миткалото, romanized: vrah Mitkaloto, IPA: [ˈvrɤx mitˈkaɫoto]) is the rocky, partly ice-free peak rising to 1113 m on Eurydice Peninsula, Danco Coast in Graham Land, Antarctica next north of Kapisturia Cove and north-northwest of the terminus of Bozhinov Glacier on the east coast of Charlotte Bay.

The feature is named after the Bulgarian enlightener and revolutionary Matey Preobrazhenski (1828–1875), known as "Mitkaloto".

== Location ==
Mitkaloto Peak is located at 64°35′40″S 61°30′35″W, which is 7.55 km east-northeast of the east side of the entrance to Giffard Cove, 8.7 km southeast of Meusnier Point and 3.9 km north-northwest of Petrov Ridge. British mapping in 1978.

== Maps ==
- Antarctic Digital Database (ADD). Scale 1:250000 topographic map of Antarctica. Scientific Committee on Antarctic Research (SCAR). Since 1993, regularly upgraded and updated.
