= Bonev Peak =

Mountain in Antarctica

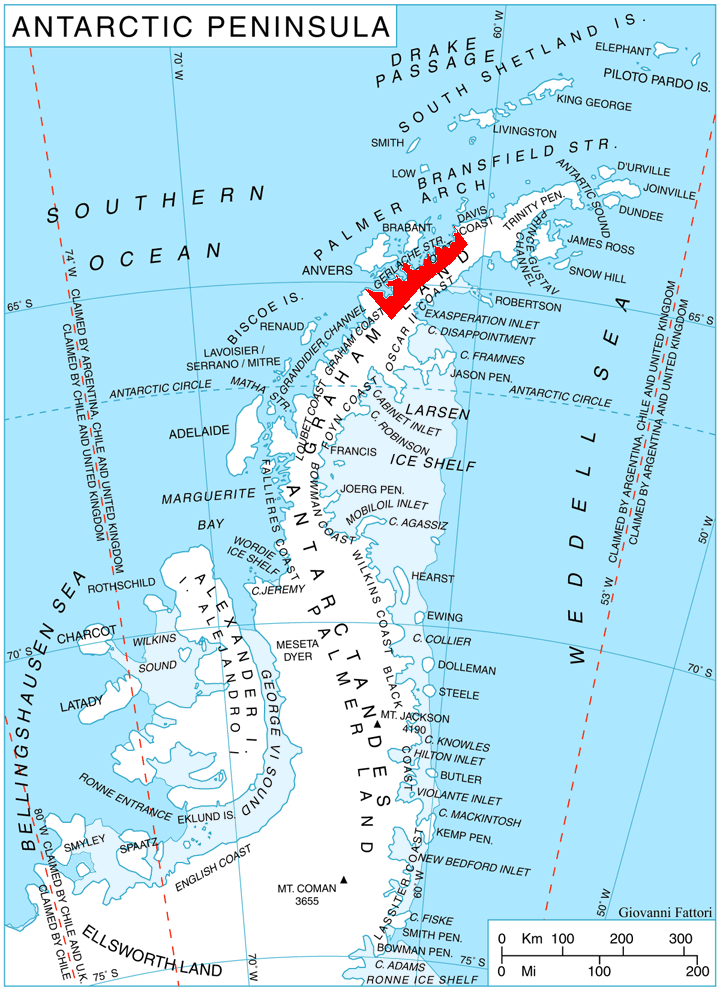
Location of Danco Coast on Antarctic Peninsula.

Bonev Peak (Bulgarian: Бонев връх, romanized: Bonev vrah, IPA: [ˈbɔnɛv ˈvrɤx]) is the mostly ice-covered peak of elevation 906 m on Eurydice Peninsula, Danco Coast in Graham Land. It has steep and partly ice-free east and northwest slopes, and surmounts Charlotte Bay to the southwest and west, its easterly part Recess Cove to the north, and Nobile Glacier to the northeast.

The peak is named after Kamen Bonev, geologist and mountain guide at St. Kliment Ohridski base in 1998/99 and subsequent seasons.

== Location ==
Bonev Peak is located at 64°33′25″S 61°33′30″W, which is 3.9 km southeast of Meusnier Point and 4.77 km northwest of Mitkaloto Peak. British mapping in 1978.

== Maps ==
- British Antarctic Territory. Scale 1:200000 topographic map. DOS 610 Series, Sheet W 64 60. Directorate of Overseas Surveys, Tolworth, UK, 1978.
- Antarctic Digital Database (ADD). Scale 1:250000 topographic map of Antarctica. Scientific Committee on Antarctic Research (SCAR). Since 1993, regularly upgraded and updated.
