= Petrov Ridge =

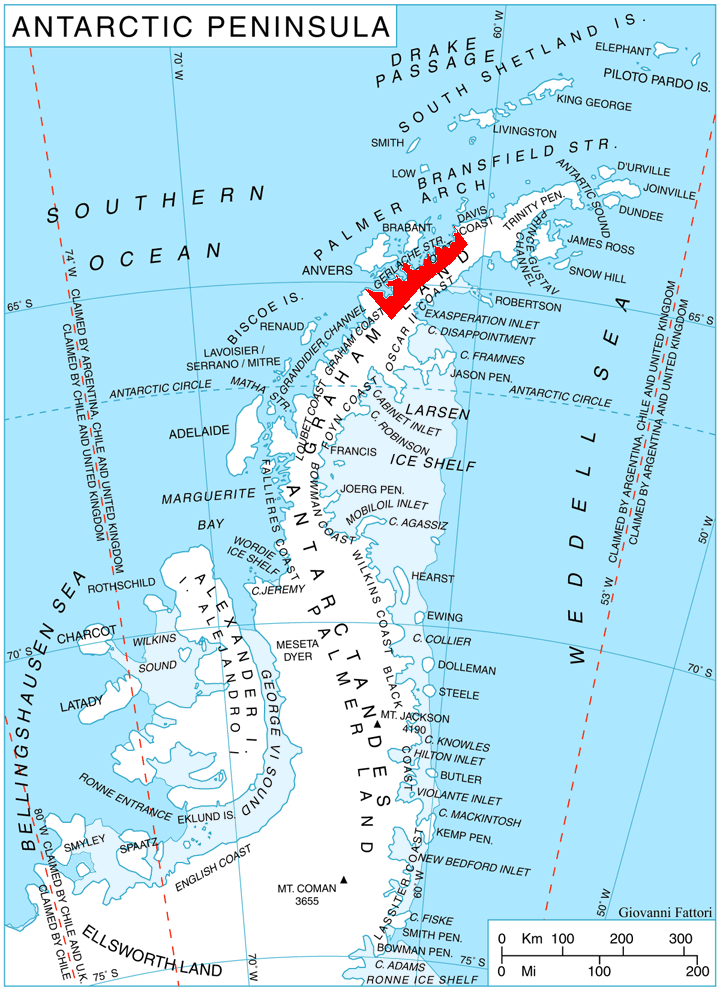
Location of Danco Coast on Antarctic Peninsula.

Petrov Ridge (Bulgarian: Петров рид, ‘Petrov Rid’ \pe-'trov 'rid\ is the rocky, partly ice-covered ridge extending 5.5 km in east-southeast to west-northwest direction, 2.5 km wide and rising to 1408 m in the north foothills of Foster Plateau on Danco Coast in Graham Land, Antarctica. It surmounts Krebs Glacier to the south-southwest, Charlotte Bay to the northwest and Bozhinov Glacier to the north-northeast.

The ridge is named after the Bulgarian poet Valeri Petrov (born Valeri Mevorah, 1920-2014).

== Location ==
Petrov Ridge is located at 64°37′36″S 61°28′44″W, which is 3.9 km south-southeast of Mitkaloto Peak and 4.5 km west of the Waist col. British mapping in 1978.

== Maps ==
- British Antarctic Territory. Scale 1:200000 topographic map. DOS 610 Series, Sheet W 64 60. Directorate of Overseas Surveys, Tolworth, UK, 1978.
- Antarctic Digital Database (ADD). Scale 1:250000 topographic map of Antarctica. Scientific Committee on Antarctic Research (SCAR). Since 1993, regularly upgraded and updated.
