= Andrée Island =

Island in Graham Land, Antarctica

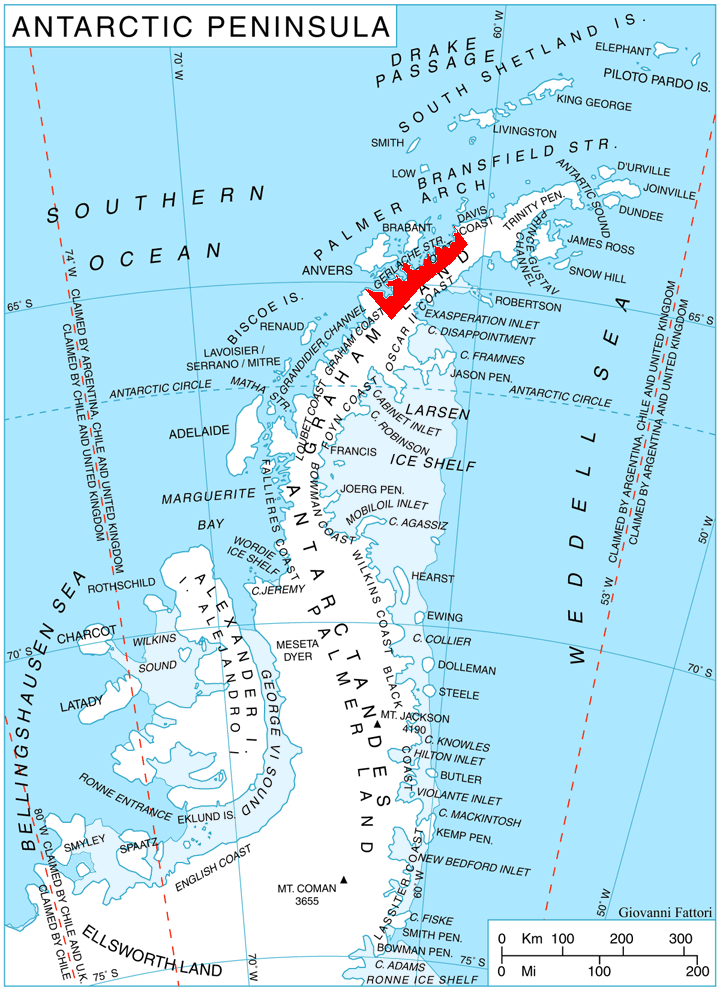
- Location of Danco Coast on Antarctic Peninsula

- Location within Antarctica

Geography
- Location: Antarctica
- Coordinates: 64°31′S 61°31′W

Administration
- Administered under the Antarctic Treaty System

Demographics
- Population: Uninhabited

Andrée Island is an island lying in Recess Cove, Charlotte Bay, off the north coast of Eurydice Peninsula, Danco Coast on the Antarctic Peninsula.

The island was mapped by the Falkland Islands Dependencies Survey from air photos taken by Hunting Aerosurveys Ltd in 1956–57, and named by the UK Antarctic Place-Names Committee in 1960 for Salomon August Andrée (1854–97), a Swedish engineer who attempted to fly over the North Pole by balloon in 1897, perishing in the attempt.

A soil and vegetation study was conducted on the island in 1981 by R. I. L. Smith.

== See also ==
- List of Antarctic and sub-Antarctic islands
