= Explorers Festival =

Festival and conference on exploration

The Explorers Festival Landkönnunarhátíð
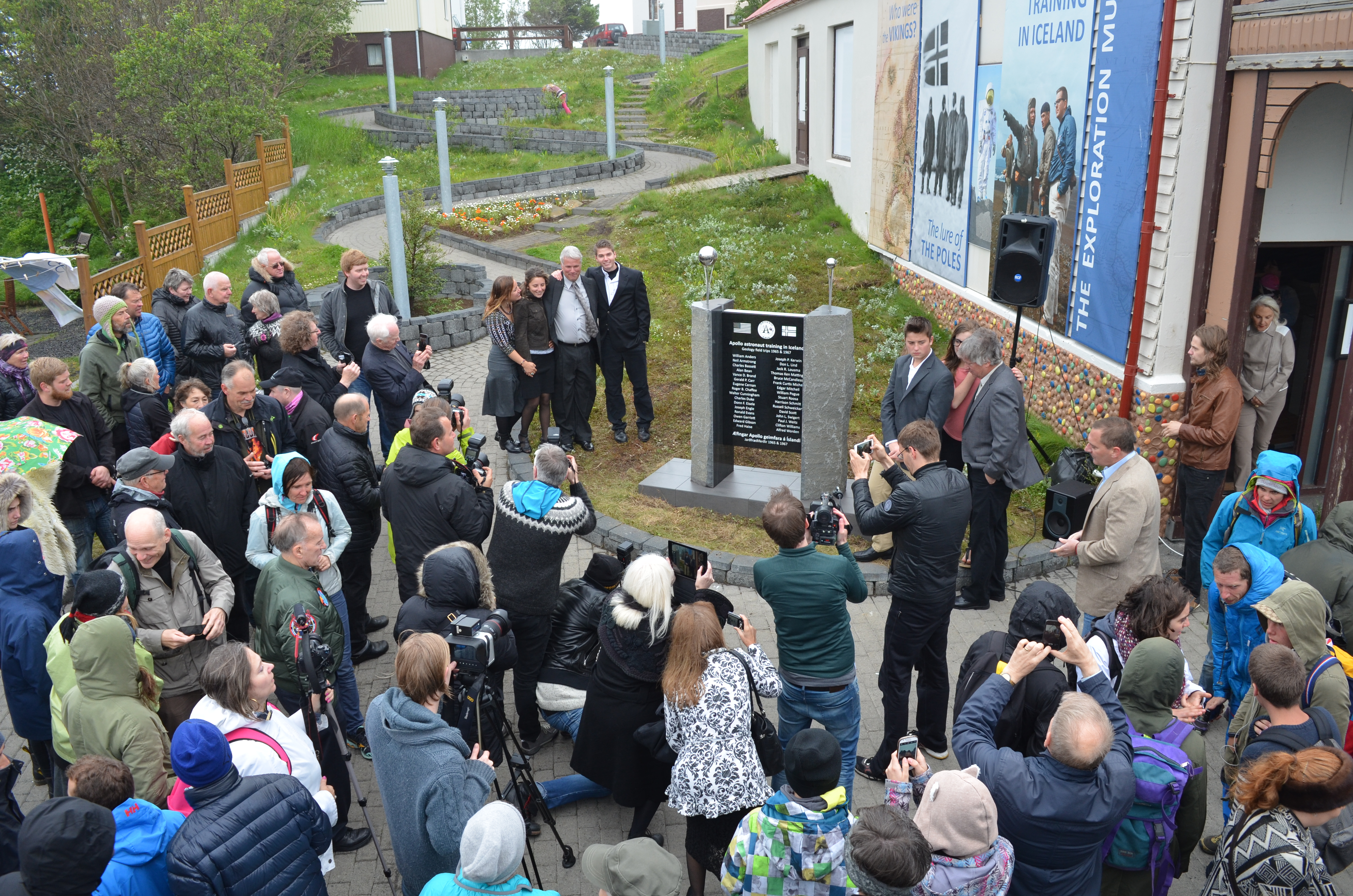
- Family of first man on the moon Neil Armstrong unveils a monument during the first edition.
- Genre: Exploration, Science and Art
- Dates: Late October or early November
- Frequency: Annual
- Locations: Húsavík, Iceland
- Founded: 2015
- Founders: Orly Orlyson; Francesco Perini
- Organiser: The Exploration Museum
- Website: www.explorersfest.org

The Explorers Festival is a festival and conference on exploration, art and science, hosted by the Exploration Museum in Húsavík, Iceland. The annual four-day event consists of talks by explorers, workshops on storytelling, concerts and art exhibitions. The first edition of the festival took place in 2015, marking the 50th anniversary of the geology training of the Apollo astronaut in Iceland. During the first edition, the family of Apollo 11 commander Neil Armstrong unveiled a monument about Iceland's role in the Apollo program.

== Events ==
The festival consists of talks and lectures by explorers and scientists, film screenings and competitions, exhibitions of artworks and photography, as well as workshops and live music events. The first and last day of the festival are reserved for short expeditions to places of geological importance and fossil sites.

=== Leif Erikson Awards ===
The Leif Erikson Awards are awarded in three categories; the Leif Erikson Award to an explorer for a lifetime achievement in exploration; Leif Erikson Young Explorer Award to an explorer under the age of 35 for achievements in exploration; and the Leif Erikson Exploration History Award, awarded to a person or an organization that has worked to promote and preserve exploration history, or to educate about exploration, science and environment issues.

=== Explorers Film Festival ===
The festival includes a mini film festival of exploration related films and documentaries. Films screened at previous editions include Kon-Tiki, Into the Inferno, Cosmic Birth and Secrets of a Frozen Ocean. During the 2019 edition, on the 50th anniversary of the Apollo 11 mission, the Neil Armstrong biopic First Man was screened, followed by a Q&A session with Neil's son Mark Armstrong who was an advisor for the production of the film as well as playing the role of Paul Haney, NASA's “voice of Mission Control” for the Gemini and Apollo missions.

=== Art exhibitions ===
Every year a new exhibition of photographs, drawings or paintings dealing with themes related to exploration is installed at the Húsavík Museum in connection to the Explorers Festival. During the 2016 edition, an exhibition of Erró's astronaut series was installed for the festival.

== Participants ==
The festival has welcomed six Apollo astronauts; Walter Cunningham of Apollo 7, Bill Anders of Apollo 8, Rusty Schweickart of Apollo 9, Charlie Duke of Apollo 16, Harrison Schmitt of Apollo 17 and Owen Garriott of Skylab 3, as well as Space Shuttle astronaut Scott E. Parazynski. Additionally the Exploration Museum has been visited by astronauts Thomas Marshburn, Loren Acton and Kathy Sullivan. The family of Apollo 11 commander Neil Armstrong took part in the 2015 and 2019 festivals. Other participants include explorer George Kourounis, photographer Chris Burkard, mountaineer Edurne Pasaban, Volcanologist Clive Oppenheimer and exploration historian Huw Lewis-Jones. The festival took place with in-person events in 2020 and 2021, but due to the COVID-19 pandemic, the majority of events, particularly in 2021, were attended by speakers via streaming from around the world.
