= Sepúlveda Point =

Sepúlveda Point (64°31′S 61°35′W) is the south entrance point of Recess Cove, in Charlotte Bay on the Danco Coast, in the Antarctic Peninsula. The feature was named "Punta Sepúlveda" by the sixth Chilean Antarctic Expedition (1952), after Teniente (Lt.) Hernan Sepúlveda Gore, of the patrol ship Lientur which worked in the area.
