= Aardvark (disambiguation) =

The aardvark is an African mammal, Orycteropus afer.

Aardvark may also refer to:

== Music ==
- Aardvark Jazz Orchestra, an eclectic big band founded in 1973
- The Aardvarks (band), an American garage rock band active in the 1960s

== Characters ==
- Aardvark, a character in The Ant and the Aardvark cartoon series voiced by John Byner
- Captain Aardvark, a character in Joseph Heller's novel Catch-22

== Computers ==
- Aardvark (search engine), a social search service (2008-2011)
- Project Aardvark, the early code name of Fog Creek Copilot remote access software
- Aardvark (video game), from 1986

== Other uses ==
- Aardvark (2010 film), an American-Argentine crime thriller film
- Aardvark (2017 film), an American drama film
- Aardvark cucumber, Cucumis humifructus, a kind of African cucumber
- Aardvark JSFU, a military mine-flail vehicle
- Aardvark-Vanaheim, a Canadian independent comic book publisher
- Brazilian aardvark, an example of circular reporting
- General Dynamics F-111 Aardvark, a military aircraft
- VF-114, a US naval unit nicknamed the "Aardvarks"

== See also ==
- Aardwolf (disambiguation)
- Otis the Aardvark presenter-puppet on CBBC 1994-2000
- Cerebus the Aardvark, title-character in comic book series by Dave Sim
