= Mark Robinson (meteorologist) =

Famous meteorologist

- Born: 27 January 1973 (age 53); Toronto, Ontario, Canada
- Education: York University, University of Guelph
- Occupations: Meteorologist, Television Presenter
- Employer: The Weather Network
- Website: Stormhunter.ca

Mark Robinson (born 27 January 1973) is a Canadian television meteorologist and storm chaser. He co-hosts the television series Storm Hunters and Unearthed, has appeared on the television series Angry Planet, and has made numerous other media appearances. In 2015, Robinson was named one of Canada's 100 greatest modern-day explorers by Canadian Geographic, and was elected a Fellow of the Royal Canadian Geographic Society.

== Storm chasing ==
A storm chaser since 2000, Robinson has documented dozens of tornadic storms and landfalling hurricanes / tropical storms, including the 2013 El Reno EF3 tornado, the Category 5 Hurricane Katrina in Gulfport, Mississippi, and Category 3 Hurricane Sandy in New York City, New York. He was the first Weather Network reporter to broadcast live from a hurricane (Katrina) and livestream a tornadic storm (from Oklahoma).

== Television and other media ==
Robinson created and, with The Weather Network's Jaclyn Whittal, co-hosts the television series Stormhunters. The series has appeared on The Weather Network in Canada, Sky in the United Kingdom, and National Geographic Channel in New Zealand and Australia. The series chronicles the adventures of the duo (and occasionally adventurer George Kourounis) as they travel across North America documenting severe weather.

Robinson co-hosts the television series Unearthed with George Kourounis, documenting natural and wild areas of the planet. The duo has so far travelled through the Northwest Passage in the Canadian Arctic, Greenland Arctic, and Antarctica. The series has been shown in Canada on The Weather Network.

He has also appeared on the television series Angry Planet as an occasional guest. Angry Planet has been shown in Canada on OLN, City-TV and The Weather Network, The Weather Channel in Australia, and the Travel Channel worldwide.

Robinson has made appearances as a guest on CBC-TV, CBC-Radio, CTV, City-TV, CNN, The Weather Channel, BBC-TV, and Discovery Channel's Daily Planet, and has been featured in articles in the Toronto Star, The Globe and Mail, USA Today and other dailies.
