= Bonev =

Bonev (Bulgarian: Бонев) is a Bulgarian masculine surname, its feminine counterpart is Boneva. It may refer to

- Antoaneta Boneva (born 1986), Bulgarian sport shooter
- Bogomil Bonev (born 1957), Bulgarian politician
- Deyan Bonev (born 1967), Bulgarian sprint canoer
- Dora Boneva (born 1936), Bulgarian painter
- Hristo Bonev (born 1947), Bulgarian football player
- Milen Bonev (born 1986), Bulgarian football player
- Ventsislav Bonev (born 1980), Bulgarian football player
- Zlatko Bonev (born 1994), Bulgarian football player

== See also ==
- Bonev Peak in Antarctica
