= Kapisturia Cove =

Cove in Antarctica

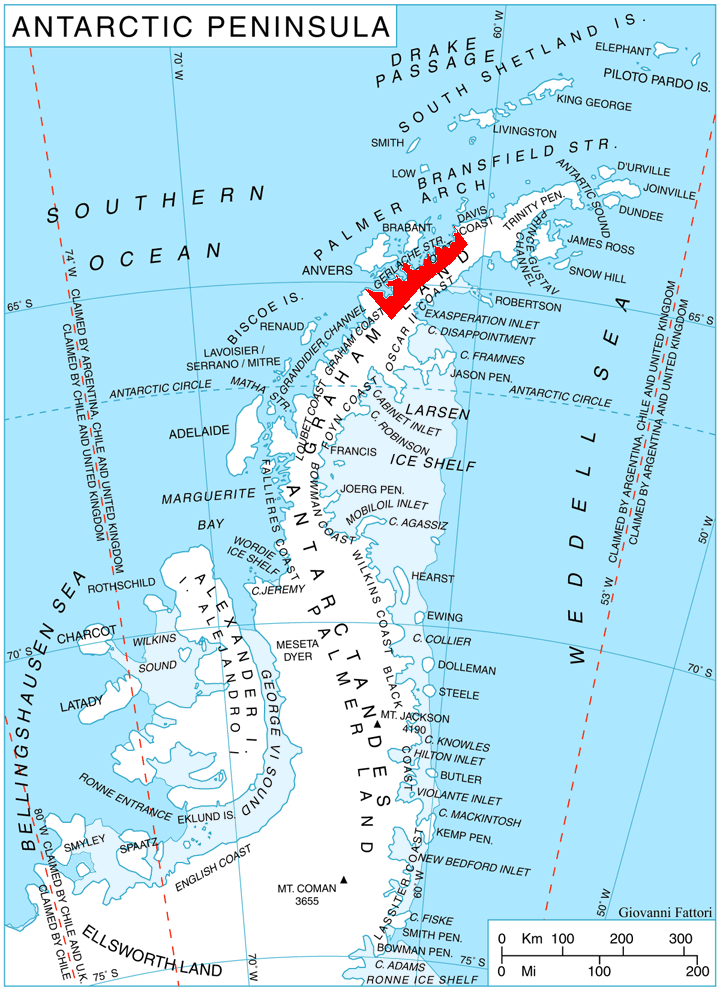
Location of Danco Coast on Antarctic Peninsula.

Kapisturia Cove (Bulgarian: залив Капистурия, Zaliv Kapisturia /'za-liv ka-pi-'stu-ri-ya/) is the 1.65 km wide cove indenting for 1.9 km Danco Coast in Graham Land, Antarctica just south of Eurydice Peninsula. It is part of Charlotte Bay and has its head fed by Bozhinov Glacier.

The cove is named after the ancient fortress of Kapisturia in Southern Bulgaria.

== Location ==
Kapisturia Cove is centred at 64°36′35″S 61°30′30″W. British mapping in 1978.

== Maps ==
- British Antarctic Territory. Scale 1:200000 topographic map. DOS 610 Series, Sheet W 64 60. Directorate of Overseas Surveys, Tolworth, UK, 1978.
- Antarctic Digital Database (ADD). Scale 1:250000 topographic map of Antarctica. Scientific Committee on Antarctic Research (SCAR). Since 1993, regularly upgraded and updated.
