= Meusnier Point =

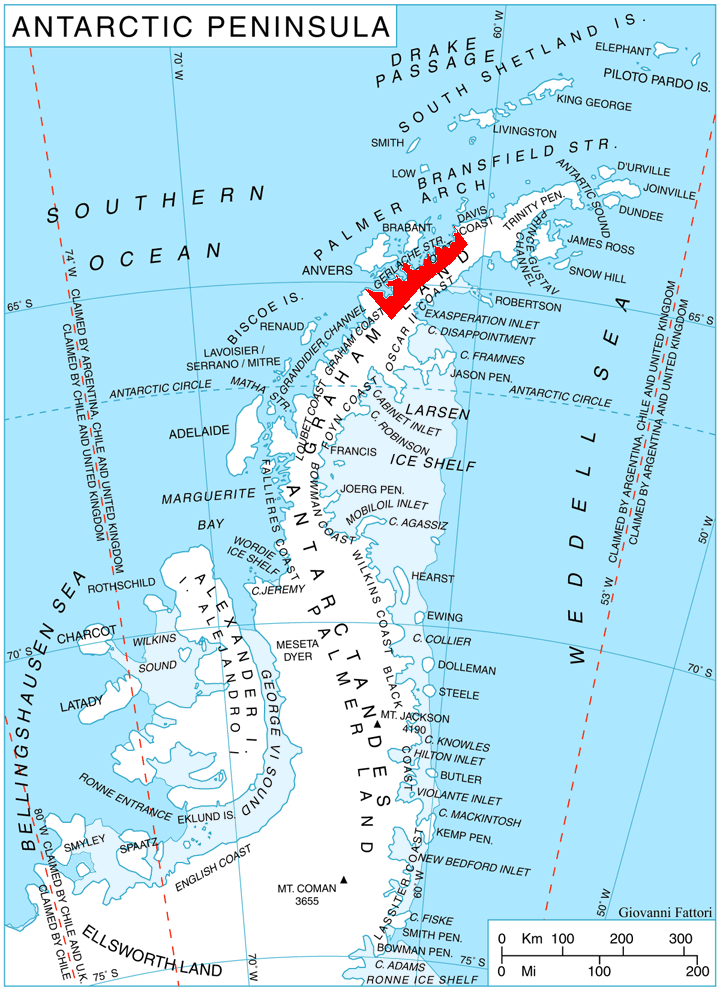
Location of Danco Coast on Graham Land, Antarctic Peninsula.

Meusnier Point (64°33′S 61°38′W) is a point within Charlotte Bay, forming the western extremity of Eurydice Peninsula, and lying 4 nautical miles (7 km) southeast of Portal Point on the west coast of Graham Land, Antarctica. It was charted by the Belgian Antarctic Expedition under Gerlache, 1897–99, and was named by the UK Antarctic Place-Names Committee in 1960 for French military engineer Jean B.M. Meusnier, the prophetic designer, in 1785, of the first dirigible airship.
