= Kari Herbert =

British travel writer, photographer and television presenter

- Born: 17 September 1970 (age 56)
- Occupations: travel writer, photographer, polar explorer, television presenter.

Kari Herbert (born 17 September 1970) is a British travel writer, photographer, polar explorer and television presenter.

== Biography ==
The elder daughter of polar explorer Sir Wally Herbert and his wife Marie, Kari Herbert spent the first few years of her life living on a remote island in the Arctic with the Polar Inuit of northwest Greenland. Her first language was Inuktun, the local dialect of Greenlandic. At the age of four Kari Herbert accompanied her parents on a journey that took them through winter blizzards in a caravan to spend time with the Sami of Lapland. She has continued to travel extensively ever since.

After leaving school she studied art in Portsmouth, then went on to work as a fashion stylist for Japanese rock bands before becoming a travel writer and photographer for newspapers and magazines such as The Guardian, The Independent, The Sunday Times, the Daily Telegraph, Geographical and Traveller. She has twice been a judge for the Guardian's annual travel writing competition.

Herbert's first book, The Explorer's Daughter, was published in 2004, and was chosen as "Book of the Week" by BBC Radio 4 and translated into several languages. She has had several further books published, inclucing Explorers' Sketchbooks, co-authored with her husband Huw Lewis-Jones, Heart of the Hero: The Remarkable Women who Inspired the Great Polar Explorers. Herbert both wrote and illustrated her most recent books, We Are Artists a book for children celebrating women artists, and We Are Explorers, published by Thames & Hudson.

Herbert has appeared on several radio and television programmes, including Full Circle a retrospective documentary series on Michael Palin, and presented a short documentary film about climate change for BBC Four in 2006. She has had solo exhibitions of her photography in the UK and Europe, and has given lectures at the Royal Geographical Society, the National Maritime Museum, the Scott Polar Research Institute, The Explorers Club among many others.

Herbert is founder and Managing Director of Polarworld, an independent publishing company that specialises in producing books about the Polar Regions. Books published to date include The Polar World by Sir Wally Herbert, Face to Face: Polar Portraits by Dr Huw Lewis-Jones in association with the Scott Polar Research Institute, University of Cambridge, Letters From Everest by George Lowe and Life on the Line by Cristian Barnett.

Herbert is also a mindfulness teacher and essential oils guide.

Herbert is a fellow of the Royal Geographical Society and a member of The Explorers Club, New York City. With husband Huw Lewis-Jones and daughter Nell she lives by the sea in Cornwall, UK.

== Programmes ==
=== Television ===
- Northern Melt: From the Frontline of Global Warming - short film – BBC Four

=== Radio ===
- Book of the Week, BBC Radio 4 (read by Emilia Fox)
- With Clive Anderson – Justice system in Greenland, BBC Radio 4
- Everywoman, BBC World Service
- Sandi Toksvig Show, LBC
- Vanessa Feltz Show, BBC London
- Excess Baggage, BBC Radio 4
- Piecing together the Ice Museum, BBC Radio 3
- Tubridy Show, RTÉ

== Bibliography ==
- We Are Explorers, Kari Herbert, Thames & Hudson,2021
- We Are Artists, Kari Herbert, Thames & Hudson,2019
- Explorers' Sketchbooks, Kari Herbert and Huw Lewis-Jones, Thames & Hudson,2016
- Heart of the Hero: The Remarkable Women Behind Polar Exploration, Kari Herbert, Saraband, 2013, ISBN 1908643218
- In Search of the South Pole, Kari Herbert and Huw Lewis-Jones, Conway, 2011, ISBN 1844861376
- The Explorer's Daughter, Kari Herbert, Viking, 2004, ISBN 0-670-91374-X
- The Explorer's Daughter, Kari Herbert, Penguin, 2005, ISBN 0141011491
- Als de Toendra Roept, Kari Herbert, The House of Books, 2006 ISBN 90-443-1671-0 (Dutch Translation)
- Mit Arktiske Barndomsland, Kari Herbert, Host & Son, 2005 ISBN 87-638-0134-5 (Danish Translation)
- The Polar World, Sir Wally Herbert, edited by Kari Herbert, Polarworld 2007, ISBN 978-0-9555255-1-3
