= Bad Trip (film) =

2021 film directed by Kitao Sakurai

- Official poster
- Directed by: Kitao Sakurai
- Screenplay by: Dan Curry; Eric André; Kitao Sakurai
- Story by: Eric André; Kitao Sakurai; Andrew Barchilon
- Produced by: Jeff Tremaine; Eric André; David Bernad; Ruben Fleischer
- Starring: Eric André; Lil Rel Howery; Tiffany Haddish
- Cinematography: Andrew Laboy
- Edited by: Matthew Kosinski; Sascha Stanton-Craven
- Music by: Joseph Shirley; Ludwig Göransson
- Production companies: Orion Pictures; Gorilla Flicks; The District
- Distributed by: Netflix
- Release date: March 26, 2021
- Running time: 84 minutes
- Country: United States
- Language: English

Bad Trip is a 2021 American hidden camera comedy film directed by Kitao Sakurai. The film follows two best friends (Eric André and Lil Rel Howery) who take a road trip from Florida to New York City so one of them can declare his love for his high school crush (Michaela Conlin), all the while being chased by the other's criminal sister (Tiffany Haddish), whose car they have stolen for the trip.

Bad Trip was scheduled to premiere at South by Southwest on March 14, 2020, and receive a theatrical release by Orion Pictures on April 17, 2020, but was postponed indefinitely due to the COVID-19 pandemic. It was accidentally released on Amazon Prime Video on April 17 and pirated prior to its official release. The film was later sold to Netflix, which released it on March 26, 2021. Bad Trip received generally positive reviews from critics.

== Plot ==
In small-town Florida, Chris is working at a car wash when a woman, Maria, arrives. Chris tells the man whose car he is washing that she is his high school crush. He begins to vacuum the car, but the overpowered vacuum sucks his clothes off, leaving him naked. He panics and hides in the car. The man has a conversation with Maria, attempting to get her number for Chris, but she declines and leaves.

Chris' best friend, Bud, is working at a computer shop, where his sister, Trina, pulls up in her car. After having a conversation with two customers, she begs Bud for money, but he refuses. Although on house arrest, she robs the store and removes her ankle monitor, gives money to the two customers, warning them not to snitch. Later, Chris and Bud talk about Trina, Maria, and going on big adventures.

One year later, a plumber enters Chris' house and Chris surprises him by rising from a bathtub full of beer cans. Chris realises he is late and runs to his new job at a smoothie shop, causing chaos along the way. Maria enters the shop, and they have a conversation, where she reveals she runs an art gallery in New York City. She gives him her card for the gallery. Looking at the card causes him to lose focus and accidentally catch his hand in a smoothie blender, splattering blood everywhere.

He later asks advice from an old man, who tells him to follow Maria to New York. Chris then sings a musical number called "I Saw a Girl Today" to the confusion of everyone around him. Talking with Bud on the bus, they make the ultimate plan for a road trip to New York. Chris gets the idea to steal Trina's car, which Bud first opposes, but Chris reminds him that Trina's in jail.

Bud pays to remove the car from impound. Meanwhile, Trina escapes from jail. She finds out her car was taken and plans to kill Bud and Chris, stealing a police car to hunt them down. Chris and Bud wreck a gas station pump, go drinking at a "redneck" bar where Chris vomits uncontrollably and falls off a high ledge after having too many shots, and visit a zoo where Chris is raped by a gorilla after breaking into its enclosure to take a selfie with it.

They later crash Trina's car and get into a big argument, ending their friendship, until an ROTC recruiter tells Chris some words of wisdom. Chris finds Bud on a bus back to Florida, and they make up, finally making it to Maria's art gallery. Trina sees her damaged car and finding Maria’s business card covered with Chris' blood, she continues to hunt them down. After Chris declares his love for Maria, she rejects him before Trina drives through the art gallery wall, attacking Chris with various pieces of art.

Trina chases Chris down, dangling him off the gallery roof, but Bud saves him by finally standing up to her. She embraces him, proud that he finally stood up for himself. Chris and Bud return to Maria's gallery, but she is distraught at the chaos and demands that they leave. The film ends with them deciding to cross-dress as white women at an environmentalist fundraising gala, which they had discussed while reviewing White Chicks earlier in the film, with Trina joining them as a white man.

They perform the DMX song "Party Up" on stage, much to the discomfort of everybody else. Behind-the-scenes footage plays during the closing credits, showing the reactions of the people who appeared throughout the film upon being told they were part of a hidden camera prank.

== Cast ==
- Eric André as Chris Carey
- Lil Rel Howery as Bud Malone
- Tiffany Haddish as Trina Malone
- Michaela Conlin as Maria Li

== Production ==
During the conceptualisation of the film, André attended Robert McKee's story seminars and consulted Jeff Tremaine and Nathan Fielder. When the film was finished, André screened it before release for comedian Sacha Baron Cohen, a veteran of hidden camera prank shows and films.

== Release ==
Bad Trip was scheduled to have its world premiere at South by Southwest on March 14, 2020, but the festival was cancelled due to the COVID-19 pandemic. The film was also scheduled to be released theatrically by MGM's Orion Pictures on April 17, 2020, but it was pulled from the schedule due to the movie theater closures because of the pandemic restrictions. It had previously been scheduled for a theatrical release in October 2019, as well as February 2020. The film was accidentally released digitally on Amazon Prime Video for a brief time on April 17, 2020. It was taken down soon afterward, but was available long enough to be leaked onto file-sharing platforms such as The Pirate Bay.

In May 2020, it was announced that MGM had sold the film to Netflix. The leak reportedly did not affect the sale. Netflix released the film on March 26, 2021.

== Reception ==
On review aggregator Rotten Tomatoes, the film holds an approval rating of 80% based on reviews from 75 critics, with an average rating of 6.8/10. The website's critics consensus reads, "With ingeniously gross hidden-camera bits that often find their unsuspecting marks at their best, Bad Trip turns out to be a surprisingly uplifting ride." According to Metacritic, which calculates a weighted average score of 61 out of 100 based on 17 critics, the film received "generally favorable" reviews.

Nick Allen of RogerEbert.com gave the film 3 1/2 out of 4 stars, and called it "an excellent showcase for Eric André" and wrote that it "shows an evolution in the hidden camera subgenre, given its warming spirit about people." Michael Phillips of Chicago Tribune gave the film 3 out of 4 stars and wrote, "Bad Trip has the blithe advantage of the easygoing complementary personalities at its center."
