= Roy Koerner =

British explorer (1932–2008)

Roy Koerner MBE was a Polar explorer who participated in the 1968-1969 surface crossing of the Arctic Ocean with expedition leader Sir Wally Herbert. The then Prime Minister, Harold Wilson described the journey as "a feat of endurance and courage which ranks with any in polar history", and Prince Philip felt "ranks among the greatest triumphs of human skill and endurance".

== Early life and career ==
Koerner was born on 3 July 1932 in Copnor, Portsmouth. From an early age, he was nicknamed "Fritz" on account of his Germanic surname, and the moniker stuck. He was educated at Sheffield University, after which he taught at Bridgemary Community School before joining the British Antarctic Survey in 1957.

== Polar career ==
From 1968 to 1969 he was a member of the British Trans-Arctic Expedition led by Wally Herbert, a 3,800 miles (6,100 km) surface crossing of the Arctic Ocean, from Alaska to Spitsbergen. In the 1970s Koerner emigrated to Canada where he spent more than forty years studying the history embedded in glacial ice. He was head of the Ice Core Laboratory at Ottawa. Koerner died after being sent home from his final mission on 26 May 2008.

== Tributes ==
Koerner has a 600-metre high rock named after him on Deception Island in the British Antarctic Territory.
