= Kitao Sakurai =

Japan-born American filmmaker (born 1983)

- Born: 1983 (age 42–43); Kyoto City, Kyoto Prefecture, Japan
- Citizenship: United States
- Occupations: Film director; screenwriter; producer; cinematographer
- Years active: 1995 – present

Japanese name
- Kanji: 桜井 希太央
- Hiragana: さくらい きたお
- Katakana: サクライ キタオ
Transcriptions
- Romanization: Sakurai Kitao

Kitao Sakurai (Japanese: 桜井 希太央, Hepburn: Sakurai Kitao; born 1983) is a Japanese-born American filmmaker and actor. He is best known for his collaborations with comedian Eric André, as the principal director of The Eric Andre Show (2012–23) and the writer-director of the film Bad Trip (2021). He directed the 2026 film adaptation of the fighting video game Street Fighter.

== Early years ==
Sakurai was born in Kinugasa district of Kyoto in 1983, and was raised in Cleveland Heights, Ohio.

Originally a child actor, he made his debut aged 12 with a supporting role in the martial arts action film Best of the Best 3: No Turning Back (1995). He also appeared in the made-for-television film The Best Bad Thing (1997) and Kevin Smith's Dogma (1999).

== Career ==
=== Film ===
Sakurai trained as a cinematographer and shot independent and short films throughout the early 2000s. He made his feature directorial debut with the low-budget crime thriller Aardvark (2010), which was shot in his hometown of Cleveland.

In 2021, he directed the hidden camera comedy film Bad Trip, starring regular collaborator Eric André.

Sakurai directed The Passage, a short film co-written by and starring American comedian Phil Burgers ("Dr Brown"). It premiered at Sundance in 2018, and won Best Short Fiction prize at the LA Film Festival, Best Comedy at Aspen Shortsfest, and the Grand Jury Prize at the Nashville Film Festival.

In February 2025, Sakurai was announced as the director of the live-action film adaptation of the Street Fighter video game franchise. The film was released in the United States by Paramount Pictures on October 16, 2026.

Sakurai co-founded the New York-based production company Naked Faces, with Andrew Barchilon.

=== Television ===
Beginning in 2012, Sakurai was the regular director for The Eric Andre Show, directing 62 of 68 total episodes between 2012 and 2023.

He directed 5 episodes of the FXX sitcom Dave.

In 2023, Sakurai directed the pilot episode of Twisted Metal. He subsequently directed three episodes in the first season.

He directed the pilot episode and was an executive producer of the Amazon Prime Video series Butterfly.

He has also directed numerous television commercials.

== Filmography ==
Key
†	Denotes titles that have not yet been released

=== Feature film ===
Year	Title	Director	Writer	Ref.
2010	Aardvark	Yes	Yes	
2021	Bad Trip	Yes	Yes	
2026	Street Fighter	Yes	Yes	

Director of photography

- Transformations (2006)
- You Wont Miss Me (2009)

Acting roles

Year	Title	Role
1995	Best of the Best 3: No Turning Back	Justin Banning
1997	The Best Bad Thing	Zenny Hata
1999	Dogma	Stygian Triplet
2010	Aardvark	Darius Szopa
2011	Treatment	Tennis Instructor
2011	We Are the Hartmans	Music Video Director

=== Television ===
Year	Title	Director	Executive Producer	Writer	Notes
2012–23	The Eric Andre Show	Yes	Yes	Yes	62 episodes (Director); 25 episodes (Writer)
2012	The Eric Andre New Year's Eve Spooktacular	Yes	Yes	Yes	TV special
2021	The Premise	Yes	No	No	Episode "Social Justice Sex Tape"
2021–23	Dave	Yes	No	No	5 episodes
2023	Twisted Metal	Yes	Yes	No	Directed 4 episodes
2025	Butterfly	Yes	Yes	No	Directed episodes "Pilot" and "Daegu"
2026	Beef	Yes	Yes	No	Directed episodes "I Am Killing My Flesh Without It" and "Those Blue Remembered Hills"
