= MDs (TV series) =

- Genre: Medical drama
- Created by: Gary Tieche
- Starring: William Fichtner; Jane Lynch; John Hannah; Leslie Stefanson; Aunjanue Ellis; Michaela Conlin
- Music by: Mark Mothersbaugh
- Country of origin: United States
- Original language: English
- No. of seasons: 1
- No. of episodes: 12 (4 unaired)

Production
- Executive producers: Gary Tieche; René Echevarria; Marc Platt; William Fichtner; John Hannah; David Schulner; Michael Hoffman; James D. Parriott
- Producers: Jonathan R. Hiatt; Abby Wolf-Weiss; Stephen Cragg
- Running time: 44 minutes
- Production companies: Marc Platt Productions; Touchstone Television

Original release
- Network: ABC
- Release: September 25 – December 11, 2002

MDs (Medical Doctors) is an American medical drama television series that aired on ABC from September 25 to December 11, 2002. It starred William Fichtner as Dr. Bruce Kellerman, Jane Lynch as Aileen Poole, and John Hannah as Dr. Robert Dalgety. The series only lasted one season, and though 11 episodes were filmed, only 8 were ever aired. The series was never released on DVD and it is very hard to find. The only known full length episodes of MDs can be found on YouTube. MDs was written and created by Gary Tieche.

Dr. Robert Dalgety, a dedicated and brilliant general surgeon, and Dr. Bruce Kellerman, head of cardiothoracic surgery, are two renegade surgeons working together in a megasized, megafrugal, aging HMO. With the help of Dr. Quinn Joyner and Dr. Maggie Yang, they buck the system any way they can in pursuit of the care patients need and deserve. On the opposing team are Shelly Pangborn, the new hospital administrator, and assistant hospital administrator, Frank Coones. Together with Nurse "Doctor" Poole, they are more concerned with the bottom line than patients' health.

== Cast ==
- William Fichtner as Dr. Bruce Kellerman
- Jane Lynch as Aileen Poole
- John Hannah as Dr. Robert Dalgety
- Leslie Stefanson as Shelly Pangborn
- Aunjanue Ellis as Quinn Joyner
- Michaela Conlin as Dr. Maggie Yang
- Robert Joy as Frank Coones
- Wade Williams as Big Thor Amundsen
- Thomas Lennon as Chester E. Donge

== Production ==
Very little is known about the production of MDs. The show was pitched by Gary Tieche to ABC under the working title The Oath. The name was later changed to Meds, and finally changed again to MDs although still pronounced as 'Meds.' Twelve episodes were filmed, and they were aired out of order, which some blame for the ratings decline evident during its run. The third episode filmed "Connective Tissue" (with production code H232) was never aired; however, "Wing and a Prayer," the final episode filmed (with production code H241), aired seventh on December 4, 2002. The episode, "Blood", with production code H239 was filmed; however, no director and no writer have been released. Throughout its run, eight episodes of MDs aired. A ninth episode entitled "Family Secrets" was scheduled to air on December 18, 2002; however, the show was cancelled on December 17, 2002, and was permanently removed from ABC's schedule.

== Episodes ==
No.	Title	Directed by	Written by	Original release date	Prod. code	US viewers (millions)	Household Rating/Share
1	"Time of Death"	Michael Hoffman	Gary Tieche	September 25, 2002	H230	8.73	3.4/9
In the opener, Kellerman and Dalgety rope intern Maggie Yang into helping them treat an uninsured patient. Meanwhile, Mission's new administrator gets off to a rough start; and a heart patient refuses to undergo surgery that could save his life.
2	"A La Casa"	Michael M. Robin	Rene Echevarria & Jonathan R. Hiatt	October 2, 2002	H231	6.88	2.9/8
When Pangborn allows an ER-set TV show to film at Mission, Kellerman gets in on the act to snag some much-needed medical equipment being used as props. Meanwhile, Quinn and Maggie square off over the treatment of a stroke patient; and Dalgety's fling with a staffer lands him in hot water after it begins to look like a case of sexual harassment.
3	"Open Heart"	Rick Rosenthal	Todd Ellis Kessler	October 9, 2002	H233	6.43	3.0/8
A car crashes into a group of people at a bus stop outside Mission General. Kellerman has problems with his superstitions while doing open-heart surgery on a Buddhist dignitary. Gina places a sacred charm in the hands of a patient recently pulled off life support.
4	"Heartland"	Dan Lerner	Jonathan R. Hiatt	October 16, 2002	H234	6.50	2.8/8
Kellerman and Dalgety are flown to Vegas by Dr. (Wiseguy) Wiseman in hazardous weather as they try to get a heart to a transplant recipient before the heart 'expires'. Maggie Yang faces the consequences when she rejects the advances of Dr. Posner. Donge reveals amorous feelings for Nurse Poole.
5	"Cruel and Unusual"	Vondie Curtis Hall	Sharon Lee Watson	October 23, 2002	H236	6.16	2.9/8
Dalgety and Maggie Yang try to sabotage Donge's latest moneymaking scheme which involves a "virtual doctor" who prescribes treatments for patients via email only. And two transplant candidates -- a death row prisoner and a private citizen -- both need the same heart to survive.
6	"R.I.P."	Peter Horton	Robert Doherty	October 30, 2002	H235	6.60	4.5/8
Maggie is spooked at Halloween after reading about a spate of murders that took place 50 years ago, and a hospital administrator is arrested following an altercation over a parking space. Joyner uncharacteristically joins forces with Kellerman to perform emergency surgery to save the life of a mother and her unborn child, while Dalgety tries to help the distressed girlfriend of a recently deceased patient.
7	"Wing and a Prayer"	Vince Misiano	Joan Rater & Tony Phelan	December 4, 2002	H241	7.55	2.9/7
Maggie Yang treats a female blues singer for a condition that could end her career; a patient with "wings" seems to have the power to heal other patients by his touch; and a beloved hospital volunteer is in critical condition after being shot by burglars. Meanwhile, when a patient is caught smoking a marijuana cigarette, Nurse Poole is determined to find the source; the hospital brass search for an escaped monkey; and Dalgety performs an unauthorized surgery on an illegal alien who could be deported if caught.
8	"Reversal of Fortune"	Peter O'Fallon	David Schulner	December 11, 2002	H237	4.67	2.0/5
A man who refuses surgery because he thinks he is a space alien sorely tries Dalgety's patience. Meanwhile, Donge plots to become the new chief hospital administrator -- but collapses from a weak heart -- a wife seems strangely indifferent to her husband's life-threatening surgery, and Kellerman is angry when he finds out his ex-wife is pregnant.
9	"Family Secrets"	Peter O'Fallon	Lisa Michelle Payton	Unaired	H238	TBD	TBA
When a Christmastime baby is found abandoned in the hospital parking lot, Dr. Joyner quickly grows attached; Dalgety tries to save a homeless man who was stabbed in the hospital waiting room; authorities bring dozens of homeless people to Mission General to "clean up the parks;" and Kellerman assists in surgery with a seductive female physician who was once his lover.
10	"Connective Tissue"	Peter O'Fallon	Jonathan R. Hiatt	Unaired	H232	TBD	TBA
11	"Risk Management"	TBD	TBD	Unaired	H240	TBD	TBA
12	"Blood"	TBD	TBD	Unaired	H239	TBD	TBA

== Awards and nominations ==
Cinematographer Robert Primes won an award for Outstanding Achievement in Cinematography in Episodic TV Series from the American Society of Cinematographers for the seventh episode: "Wing and a Prayer".
