= Peter Rowe (filmmaker) =

Canadian filmmaker and author

- Born: July 23, 1947 (age 79); Winnipeg, Manitoba, Canada
- Education: McMaster University
- Occupations: filmmaker, film director, film producer, author
- Years active: 1967–present
- Spouse: Carolyn Rowe
- Children: Ashley Rowe (News Anchor, WRAL-TV, Raleigh, North Carolina); Brianna Rowe (Video Producer, United Nations, Geneva).
- Website: www.peterrowe.tv

Peter Rowe (born 1947) is a Canadian filmmaker and author specializing in themes of history and exploration. He is the producer of the 49-part television series Angry Planet, which airs on streaming and television networks around the world. His latest book, ''Blood and Fame--The Intersecting Lives of Roman Polanski and Charles Manson, and his latest feature film, Borderline Funny, we're both released in 2026.

== Career ==
=== Films ===
Rowe has produced and/or directed over 190 films and television shows, including 10 features.

Rowe’s feature films include Borderline Funny (2026), Water Crazy (2025), Treasure Island starring Jack Palance and Kevin Zegers, Lost! starring Ken Welsh, Michael Hogan and Helen Shaver, and The Best Bad Thing starring George Takei.

He has directed numerous documentaries including Beyond the Red Wall, Art War, Joshua Slocum: New World Columbus, and Popcorn With Maple Syrup: Film in Canada from Eh to Zed.

His 2013 film Shipwrecked on a Great Lake is based on James Fenimore Cooper's book, Ned Myers; or, A Life Before the Mast.

Television series he has directed include Angry Planet, On the Run, Super Humans, Ready or Not, E.N.G., African Skies, Exploring Under Sail, Alien Invaders and Fast Track.

His wilderness filmmaking has taken place in over 40 countries and many far-flung corners of the world including numerous active volcanoes, several hurricanes and tornadoes, Antarctica, Cape Horn, the Canadian Arctic, and the Sahara and Arabian Deserts.

Rowe has also performed as an actor, most recently playing Hunter S. Thompson in the TV biography series Final 24.

He appeared in the documentary film Rewind This! (2013) about the impact of VHS on the film industry and home video.

=== Books ===
- Adventures in Filmmaking, Pinewood Independent Publishing, (2013) chronicles forty years of Rowe's life, adventures, and wilderness filmmmaking around the world.
- Music vs The Man, Armin Lear Press, (2020) chronicles the battles between musicians and the authorities—police, border guards, mayors, city councils, the FBI, the Kremlin.
- Ablaze: 10 Years that Shook the World, Pinewood Press, (2021) recounts the revolutionary, incendiary era of the late 60s and early 70s, including the birth of the new passions of the era — Black power, the environmental movement, women's liberation, gay pride, the animal rights movement, sexual revolution, and the antiwar movement.
- Out There: The Batshit Antics of the World's Greatest Explorers, Sutherland House Books, (2023) gives a totally original account of the extraordinary and often lunatic explorations of Sir John Franklin, Mungo Park, Ernest Shackleton, David Livingstone, Sir Richard Francis Burton, and many more.
- Blood and Fame – The Intersecting Lives of Roman Polanski and Charles Manson, CrimeInk – An imprint of Penzler Publishers, distributed by Simon & Schuster (2026), described by Publishers Weekly as “Tantalizing - worth checking out for true crime fans and film buffs alike.”

== Awards ==
- Gold Remi Award (2015) Houston International Film Festival (Shipwrecked on a Great Lake)
- Stefansson Medal (2014) The Stefansson Medal honours outstanding contributions to the cause of exploration and/or field sciences in Canada or internationally by exceptionally meritorious members of the Canadian Chapter of the Explorers Club. Medal named for Manitoban Arctic explorer and ethnologist Vilhjalmur Stefansson.

CSC Award presented to Peter Rowe, March 2010

- Canadian Society of Cinematographers (2010) Award for Lifestyle/Reality Cinematography (Angry Planet "Hurricane Triple Threat")
- Gold Special Jury Award, (2001) Houston Film Festival (Joshua Slocum: New World Columbus)
- Gold Medal, Worldfest Film Festival (1999) (Treasure Island)
- Best Film, Montreal Children’s Film Festival (1998) (The Best Bad Thing)

== Memberships ==
- Explorers Club (Fellow, Past Chair-Canadian Chapter (Ontario/Nunavut)
- Directors Guild of Canada (Ontario Chairman, 2001–2003)
- Canadian Society of Cinematographers
- Writers Guild of Canada
- Royal Canadian Geographic Society (Fellow)
- Founding Board Member, Whistler Film Festival
- Founding Board Member, Explorers Club Film Festival
- Lecturer in Post-Graduate Film Production, Sheridan College (2002–2003)
- Lecturer in Film Production, Harris Institute for the Arts (1995–1997)
