= Michaela Conlin =

American actress (born 1978)

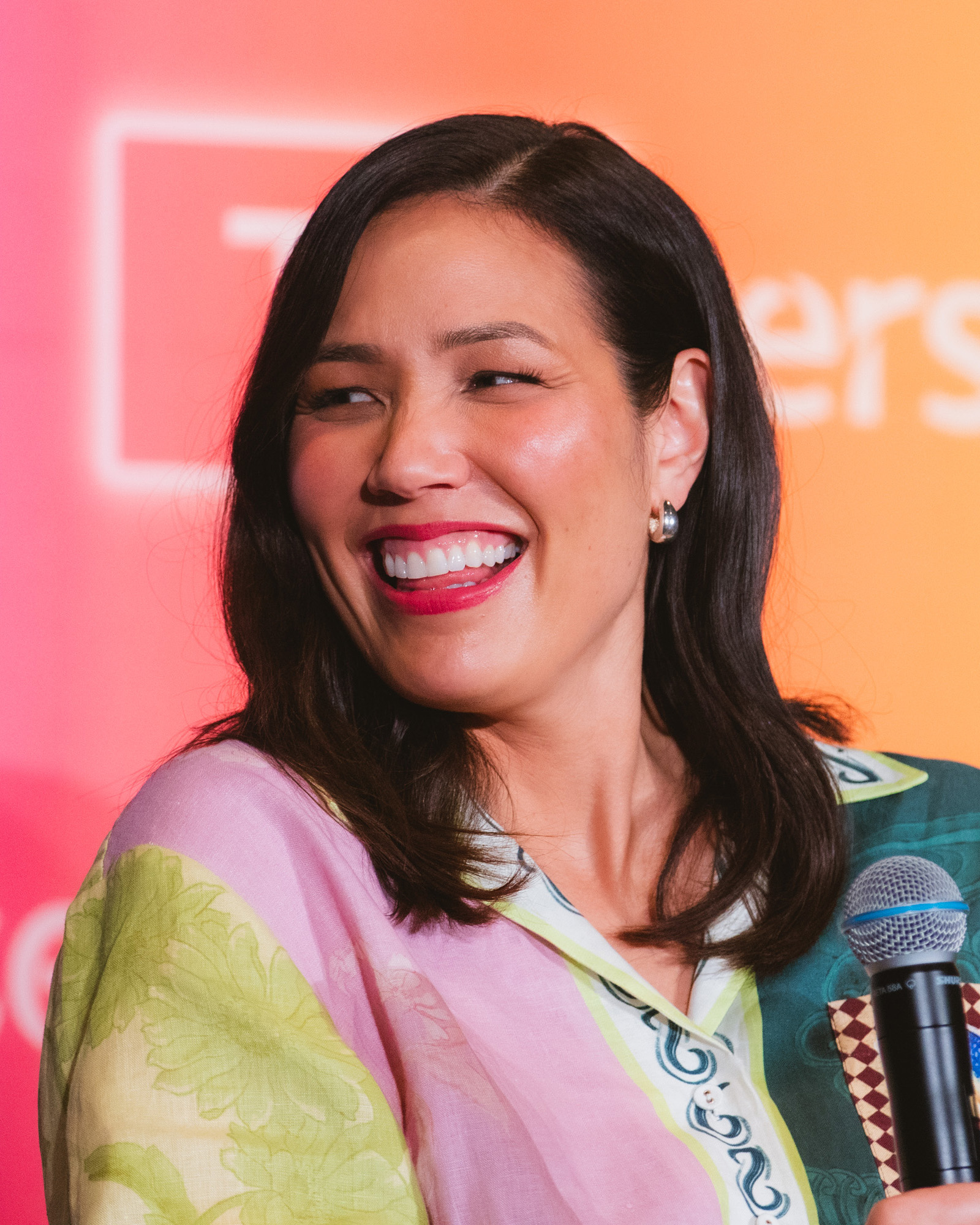
- Conlin in 2025
- Born: June 9, 1978 (age 48); Allentown, Pennsylvania, U.S.
- Education: New York University Tisch School of the Arts
- Occupation: Actress
- Years active: 2001–present
- Children: 2

Michaela Conlin (born June 9, 1978) is an American actress. She played the role of Angela Montenegro on the Fox crime procedural comedy-drama Bones from 2005 to 2017. She has also had recurring roles in the Paramount series Yellowstone (2018–2019), and the Apple TV+ series For All Mankind (2021).

== Early life and education ==
Conlin was born on June 9, 1978, in Allentown, Pennsylvania to a Chinese mother and an Irish father. Raised in South Whitehall Township, Michaela Conlin always had a passion for performing. Her parents Denise, an accountant, and Fran, a contractor nurtured her ambitions from the start. She performed in her first play The King and I at Muhlenberg College at the age of seven and continued to appear in many Pennsylvania community and regional productions.

Conlin attended Parkland High School in South Whitehall Township, Pennsylvania and graduated in 1996. After graduating, she moved to New York and attended New York University Tisch School of the Arts.

== Career ==
=== Television ===
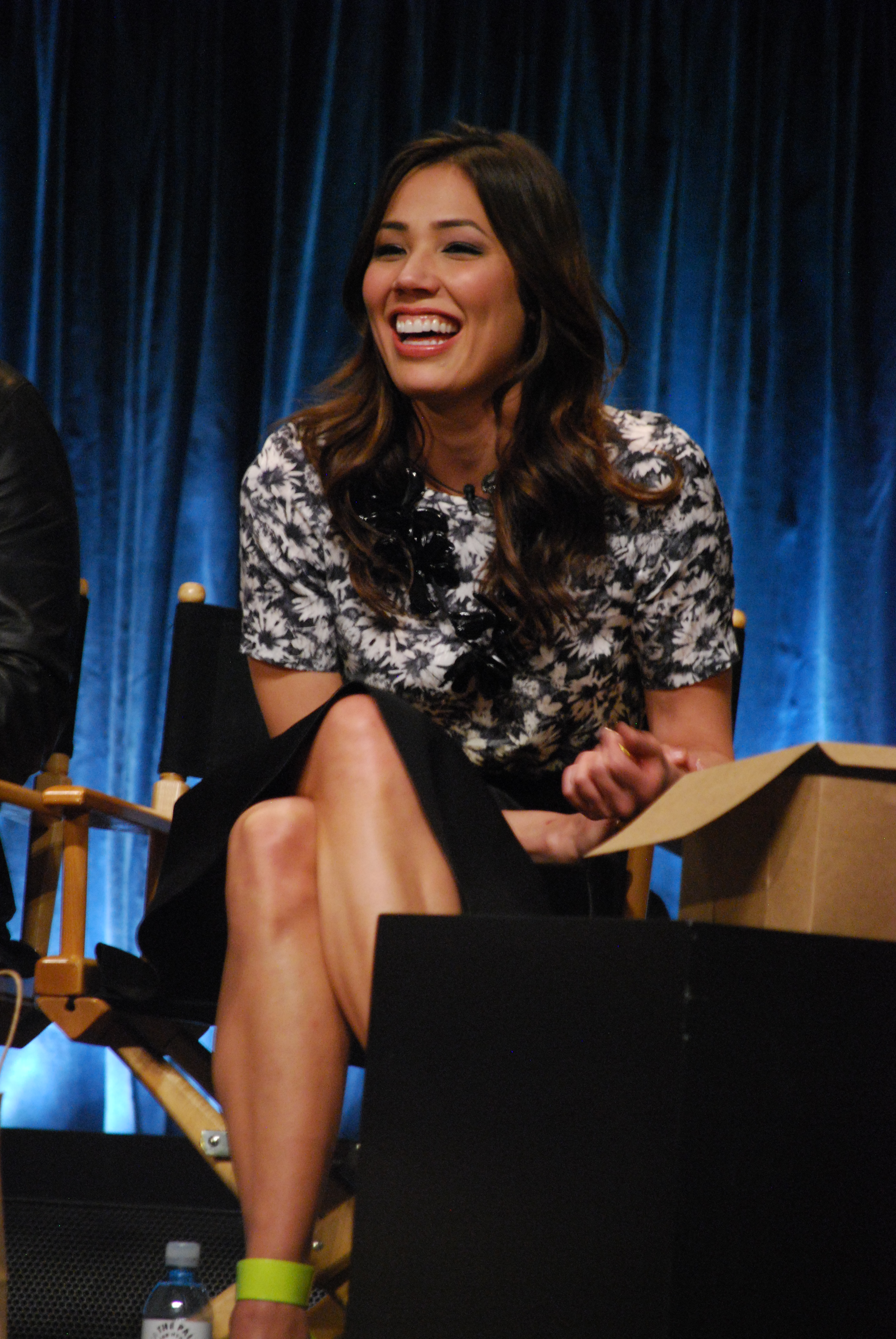
Conlin in 2012

Following her graduation from New York University, Conlin was selected to be part of the cable documentary series The It Factor, which focused on the lives of young actors in New York City. Soon after, she relocated to Los Angeles, where she landed her first starring role in the ABC drama series MDs, playing an idealistic young intern taken under the wing of the hospital's two renegade doctors, played by William Fichtner and John Hannah. She followed that with a leading role in the ABC drama series The D.A., playing an outspoken political consultant.

Conlin played Angela Montenegro on the popular Fox drama Bones, which stars Emily Deschanel and David Boreanaz. In the series, Angela is married to Dr. Jack Hodgins (T. J. Thyne), while her father is ZZ Top's Billy Gibbons, who plays a fictionalized version of himself. Angela's full name is Angela Pearly Gates Montenegro (but was known as Pookie Noodlin, where her and Hodgins got married in the small town jail), with Pearly Gates also being the name of Gibbons' Les Paul guitar. In 2008, Conlin was nominated for an Asian Excellence Award in the category of Supporting Television actress for her role on Bones.

=== Films ===
Conlin portrayed Detective Heidi Sobel in the 2011 drama film The Lincoln Lawyer. In 2021, she portrayed Maria Li in Bad Trip.

== Personal life ==
Conlin has two sons with her partner.

Conlin is best friends with Bones actress Emily Deschanel, who played her best friend Temperance "Bones" Brennan on the show.

== Filmography ==
=== Film ===
Year	Title	Role	Notes
2001	Love the Hard Way	Cara	
2002	Pipe Dream	TV reporter	
2002	Garmento	Marcy	
2006	Open Window	Miranda	
2007	Enchanted	May	
2011	The Lincoln Lawyer	Heidi Sobel	
2015	Baby, Baby, Baby	Courtney Lee	
2016	The Disappointments Room	Jules	
2021	Bad Trip	Maria Li	
2023	One True Loves	Marie	

=== Television ===
Year	Title	Role	Notes
2001	Law & Order	Rocky	Episode: "Swept Away – A Very Special Episode"
2002	The Division	House director	Episode: "Illusions"
2002	MDs	Dr. Maggie Yang	Main role
2003	JAG	Lt. Mary Nash	Episode: "Posse Comitatus"
2003	The D.A.	Jinette McMahon	4 episodes
2005–2017	Bones	Angela Montenegro	Main role
2016	Casual	Claire	Episode: "Death and Taxes"
2018	Here and Now	Sharon	Episode: "It's Here"
2018–2019	Yellowstone	Sarah Nguyen	Recurring role
2021	For All Mankind	Helena Webster	Recurring role
2022	Dollface	Delphine	2 episodes
2025	A Man on the Inside	Andrea Yi	Recurring role
