= The Invisible Thread =

Book by Yoshiko Uchida

- Author: Yoshiko Uchida
- Genre: Autobiography
- Publication date: 1991
- ISBN: 9780688137038

The Invisible Thread is an autobiography written by Yoshiko Uchida and published in 1991. The book is a memoir of her childhood during World War II.

It describes her childhood in Berkeley as a second-generation Japanese American and her life after she and her family were sent to a Japanese internment camp after the attack on Pearl Harbor.
