= The Best Bad Thing =

- Directed by: Peter Rowe
- Written by: David Preston
- Music by: Jimmy Tanaka
- Production company: CINAR Films
- Release date: 1997
- Country: Canada
- Language: English

The Best Bad Thing was originally a book authored by Yoshiko Uchida. A screenplay was developed and a film released in 1997. The story is set on the U.S. west coast during 1935 when the U.S. economy was still recovering from the effects of the Great Depression. It opens in a city, then moves to a rural cucumber farm, where the majority of the action takes place. The farm is described as along California's central coast.

== Beginning of plot ==
Most U.S. schools close during the summer, a throw-back to the days when children were needed to help with the annual harvest of crops. The story centers on the life of a twelve-year-old female character named "Rinko Tsujimura," who is sent from her parents' home, in an unnamed California city, for a character-building stay on her mother's widowed friend's rural farm. Rinko, who is out of school for the summer, is sent to the farm for a month. However, she wants to spend the summer in her home town with her school friend.

== Book ==
The book was first published in 1983 with a second publication by Aladdin Books of New York during 1986, (ISBN 0-689-71069-0).

== Feature film (1997) ==
The 89-minute feature film is billed as a Cinar production in association with the Japanese television network NHK and Pittsburgh Public Television station WQED.

Dialog is English with about 30 seconds of the film in spoken Japanese. There are no subtitles but the context is sufficient for those who do not speak Japanese to understand and follow the plot. The film was shot in Quebec, Canada. People involved in the production include:

'Executive Producers:' Madeline A. Charest, Ronald A. Weinberg, Donna Mitroff, Yoshiki Nishimura.
'Directed by:' Peter Rowe.
'Producer:' Patricia Laroie.
Distributor: The Cookie Jar Company

== Cast ==
- Lana McKissack as Rinko Tsujimura
- Michel Perron as Mr. Saunders
- Natsuko Ohama as Mrs. Tsujimura
- Robert Ito as Mr. Tsujimura
- Kitao Sakurai as Zenny
- Bryan Shigeru Matsuura as Abu
- Kirin Kiki as Auntie Hata
- George Takei as Mr. Yamanaka

== Sources ==
- United States Library of Congress catalog.
- Cinar Production VHS jacket and film credits.
