= Giffard Cove =

Giffard Cove (64°37′S 61°42′W) is a cove 1 nautical mile (1.9 km) wide on the west side of Charlotte Bay, along the west coast of Graham Land. It was charted by the Belgian Antarctic Expedition under Gerlache, 1897–99. It was named by the United Kingdom Antarctic Place-Names Committee (UK-APC) in 1960 for Henri Giffard (1825–1882), a French engineer who constructed and flew the first truly navigable balloon (dirigible airship), in 1852.
