= Treasure Island (1999 film) =

1999 film by Peter Rowe

- Movie poster
- Directed by: Peter Rowe
- Written by: Peter Rowe
- Based on: Treasure Island by Robert Louis Stevenson
- Produced by: Pieter Kroonenburg; Julie Allan
- Starring: Jack Palance; Kevin Zegers; Patrick Bergin; Malcolm Stoddard; David Robb; Cody Palance; Dermot Keaney
- Cinematography: Marc Charlebois
- Edited by: Ion Webster
- Music by: Neil Smolar
- Distributed by: Columbia TriStar
- Release date: January 8, 1999
- Running time: 98 minutes
- Country: United States
- Language: English

Treasure Island is a 1999 film adaptation of Robert Louis Stevenson's 1883 novel. It was written and directed by Peter Rowe and stars Kevin Zegers as Jim Hawkins and Jack Palance as Long John Silver.

== Premise ==
The narrative takes place in 1759 and diverges from that of the novel in that Captain Smollett convinces Squire Trelawney and Doctor Livesey to cut Jim, a 13-year old boy, out of his rightful share of the treasure. Jim then teams up with Silver; Smollett, Trelawney, and Livesey are killed; and Jim, Silver, and Ben Gunn escape with the treasure.

== Cast ==
- Jack Palance as Long John Silver
- Kevin Zegers as Jim Hawkins
- Christopher Benjamin as Squire Trelawney
- Malcolm Stoddard as Captain Smollett
- David Robb as Doctor Livesey
- Patrick Bergin as Billy Bones
- Cody Palance as Blind Pew
- Dermot Keaney as Israel Hands
- Al Hunter Ashton as George Merry
- Philip Whitchurch as Black Dog
- Peter Rowe as Captain Flint

== Production ==
The film was shot in various locations on the Isle of Man, and distributed by Columbia TriStar and Fries Film Group. The vessel used to portray the Hispaniola was the tall ship Earl of Pembroke.
