= Yoshiko Uchida =

American novelist

- Born: November 24, 1921; Alameda, California, U.S.
- Died: June 21, 1992 (aged 70); Berkeley, California, U.S.
- Occupation: Writer
- Relatives: Michiko Kakutani (niece)
- Writing career
- Genres: fiction, folktales, nonfiction, autobiography
- Notable work: The Invisible Thread
- Literary movement: Folk Art Movement

Yoshiko Uchida (November 24, 1921 – June 21, 1992) was a Japanese American writer of children's books intended to share Japanese and Japanese-American history and culture with Japanese American children. She is most known for her series of books, starting with Journey to Topaz (1971) that took place during the era of the mass removal and incarceration of Japanese Americans during WWII. She also authored an adult memoir centering on her and her family's wartime internment (Desert Exile, 1982), a young adult version of her life story (Invisible Thread, 1991), and a novel centering on a Japanese American family (Picture Bride, 1987).

== Early life ==
Yoshiko Uchida was born in Alameda, California, on November 24, 1921. She was the daughter of Takashi ("Dwight," 1884-1971), and Iku Umegaki Uchida (1893-1966) who were both Issei. Her father, Takashi, was a businessman who worked for Mitsui before he was interned. Her mother, Iku, along with Yoshika's father graduated from Doshisha University. She also had an older sister, Keiko ("Kay," 1918-2008, mother of former New York Times book critic Michiko Kakutani and married to mathematician Shizuo Kakutani).

She attended Longfellow School in Berkeley and University High School in Oakland. She graduated from high school in 2 1/2 years and enrolled at University of California, Berkeley. In 1942, Uchida graduated from U.C. Berkeley with a B.A. in English, philosophy, and history.

== Internment ==
Yoshiko was in her senior year at U.C. Berkeley when the Japanese attacked the naval base at Pearl Harbor in December 1941. Soon after, President Franklin D. Roosevelt ordered all Japanese Americans on the west coast to be rounded up and imprisoned in internment camps. Uchida's father was questioned by the Federal Bureau of Investigation, and the whole family was interned for three years, first at Tanforan Racetrack in California, and then at Topaz War Relocation Center in Utah. In the camps, Yoshiko taught school and had the chance to view the injustices that the Americans were perpetrating and the varying reactions of Japanese Americans towards their ill-treatment.

In 1943 Uchida was accepted to graduate school at Smith College in Massachusetts, and allowed to leave the camp, but her years there left a deep impression. Her 1971 novel, Journey to Topaz, is fiction, but closely follows her own experiences, and many of her other books deal with issues of ethnicity, citizenship, identity, and cross-cultural relationships.

== Career ==
Over the course of her career, Yoshiko Uchida published more than thirty books, including non-fiction for adults and fiction for children and teenagers from 1949 to 1991.

Yoshiko's career began in Philadelphia after accepting a teaching job at a Quaker school. She spent several years there before moving to New York. There she worked as a secretary as well as began her writing career. She began submitting her work, with no result at first. Her first publication came in 1949 with The Dancing Kettle and Other Japanese Folk Tales. This is where she began to gain traction in her writing career as she published many more children's books. Through these publications, she was known for creating the genre of Japanese American children's literature.

In 1952, she traveled to Japan on a Ford Foundation research fellowship that gave her the information needed to create three more collections of folktales.

In the early 1980s, Uchida traveled, lectured and earned more than 20 awards for her works. During this time, she created her 1982 autobiography, Desert Exile, examining her experiences of her and her family's internment. In addition to Desert Exile, many of her other novels including Picture Bride, A Jar of Dreams, and The Bracelet deal with Japanese American impressions of major historical events including World War I, the Great Depression, World War II, and the racism endured by Japanese Americans during these years.

I try to stress the positive aspects of life that I want children to value and cherish. I hope they can be caring human beings who don't think in terms of labels—foreigners or Asians or whatever—but think of people as human beings. If that comes across, then I've accomplished my purpose.

== Work on Japanese folk pottery ==
In 1959, Uchida received a Guggenheim Fellowship to study the folk pottery movement in Japan. She spent two years researching and becoming acquainted with major figures in that artistic current, including Shoji Hamada and Kanjiro Kawai. Uchida wrote a book with Kawai, We Do Not Work Alone: The Thoughts of Kanjiro Kawai. She collected several pots by Hamada and Kawai that she later donated to the Asian Art Museum in San Francisco.

== Awards ==
- Ford Foundation Fellowship
- American Library Association's Notable Book citation for Journey to Topaz
- Commonwealth club of California Medals in 1972 for Samurai of Gold Hill and A Jar of Dreams in 1982
- New York Public Library's Best Book of the Year citation in 1983 for The Best Bad Thing
- Child Study Association of America Children's Book of the Year in 1985 for The Happiest Ending
- Japanese American of the Biennium award from the Japanese American Citizens League in 1988

== Bibliography ==
This is a partial list of Uchida's published work. Yoshiko Uchida wrote 34 books.

- The Dancing Kettle and Other Japanese Folk Tales (1949)
- New Friends for Susan (1951)
- The Magic Listening Cap: More Folk Tales from Japan (1955)
- The Full Circle (1957)
- Takao and Grandfather's Sword (1958)
- The Promised Year (1959)
- Mik and the Prowler (1960)
- Rokubei and the Thousand Rice Bowls (1962)
- The Forever Christmas Tree (1963)
- Sumi's Prize (1964)
- The Sea of Gold, and Other Tales from Japan (1965)
- In-Between Miya (1967)
- Hisako's Mysteries (1969)
- Sumi and the Goat and the Tokyo Express (1969)
- Makoto, The Smallest Boy (1970)
- Journey to Topaz: A Story of the Japanese American Evacuation (1971)
- Samurai of Gold Hill (1972)
- The Birthday Visitor (1975)
- The Rooster who Understood Japanese (1976)
- The Bracelet (1976)
- Journey Home (1978) (originally published as a short story)
- Jar of Dreams (1981)
- Desert Exile: The Uprooting of a Japanese-American Family (Autobiography) (1982)
- The Best Bad Thing (1983)
- The Happiest Ending (1985)
- Picture Bride (1987)
- Two Foolish Cats (1987)
- The Terrible Leak (1990)
- The Big Book for Peace (1990) (Illustrated by Allen Say)
- Invisible Thread: An Autobiography (1991)
- The Magic Purse (1993)
- The Wise Old Woman (1994)
