= Marie Herbert =

Adventurer and novelist

Lady Marie Herbert
- Born: Marie McGaughey; 1941 (age 84–85); Dublin, Ireland
- Education: Royal Central School of Speech and Drama

Marie Herbert (born 1941) is an Irish-born adventurer and author who wrote biographically as well as novels based on her experiences.

== Biography ==
Born Marie McGaughey in Dublin, Ireland in 1941 to an army family, Herbert grew up in Sri Lanka, Egypt, South India and South Africa before training as an actress in the Royal Central School of Speech and Drama in London. Herbert worked in public relations for several years before she met her husband. She married the explorer Sir Wally Herbert on 24 December 1969. With him she lived for several years with the Thule Inuit in Greenland. There she raised her daughters Kari and Pascale and discovered the details of life in the village. The family also lived in Norway and Sweden.

The couple's younger daughter died in an accident when she was fifteen. Marie Herbert became a writer, motivational speaker and therapist. Herbert was a fellow of the Royal Geographical Society as well as being a member of the Society of Woman Geographers. She became Lady Herbert when her husband was knighted in 2000.

Her daughter Kari founded the Polarworld publishing house and wrote The Explorer's Daughter.

== Bibliography ==
- The Snow People
- Reindeer People
- Healing Quest: In the Sacred Space of the Medicine Wheel
- Winter of the White Seal
- Great Polar Adventures
