= Huw Lewis-Jones =

British historian, editor, broadcaster and art critic

Huw Lewis-Jones (born 2 May 1980) is a British historian, editor, broadcaster and art director. Formerly a historian and Curator of Art at the Scott Polar Research Institute, University of Cambridge, Lewis-Jones left Cambridge in June 2010 to pursue book and broadcasting projects. He is the Editorial Director of the independent publishing company Polarworld.

== Biography ==
Grandson of a Royal Navy commander, Lewis-Jones attended Elizabeth College, Guernsey, before studying as a geography undergraduate at St John's College, Cambridge, where he was a Davidson Scholar. He earned a Master of Philosophy and Doctor of Philosophy in the history of exploration at the University of Cambridge.

Lewis-Jones' ongoing research interests include the intellectual history of exploration, maritime hagiography, and the cultural history of the nineteenth century. His particular expertise is in Antarctic and Arctic exploration, portraiture, print culture, and the history of photography and he lectures widely on these and other subjects.

Until 2010, Lewis-Jones was historian and Curator of Art at the Scott Polar Research Institute. Founded in 1920, the institute is the oldest international centre for polar research within a university and has recently been awarded a major Heritage Lottery Fund award to redevelop its permanent galleries, providing additional exhibition space and enhancing its collections for educational research. Among other responsibilities, Lewis-Jones researched and acquired the new national collection of Inuit art, also supported the Heritage Lottery Fund.

Before returning to the University of Cambridge, Lewis-Jones was a visiting fellow at Harvard University and Curator of Imperial and Maritime History at the National Maritime Museum, Greenwich. Lewis-Jones is a council member of the national charity The 1805 Club, Fellow of the Royal Geographical Society and a member of The Travellers Club, London. He is also Editor of the annual maritime history journal of the 1805 Club, The Trafalgar Chronicle.

Lewis-Jones and his partner, writer and photographer Kari Herbert, divided their time between Cambridge and London. As of 2013 they live with daughter Nell by the sea in Cornwall.

== Books and exhibitions ==
Lewis-Jones is now working on an exploration of classic mountain photography and a large photography project for the national charity the Royal National Lifeboat Institution. His most recent books as an author are a new history of the South Pole and an Arctic travel narrative for television with popular BBC presenter and adventurer Bruce Parry.

Lewis-Jones' first book was Face to Face: Polar Portraits, an account of historic and modern photographic portraiture, published in 2008. British explorer Sir Ranulph Fiennes wrote its Foreword. The book was The Sunday Times 'Book of the Week' and a 'Book of the Year' in The Observer and received much praise elsewhere. It was also published in Italy by De Agostini and in Germany by Geo and Frederking and Thaler. The Explorers Journal described it as 'one of the most stunning books of photography in recent times'.

The next in his series, Ocean Portraits, a celebration of the sea told through rare historic imagery and modern maritime photography, was released in the United Kingdom in late 2010 by Conway, an imprint of London-based publishing house Anova Books. It is understood there will also be French and German language editions. Its Foreword was written by pioneering yachtsman Sir Robin Knox-Johnston. Described by Wanderlust magazine as a trove of 'portraiture at its best; personal, insightful and delightfully intriguing', it was selected by The Guardian as one of 'the year's best photography books'. Lewis-Jones has now completed Mountain Heroes: Portraits of Adventure, with a significant international team of authors and mountaineers including Doug Scott, Sir Chris Bonington, Stephen Venables, and the celebrated National Geographic photographers Gordon Wiltsie and Cory Richards. It won the Adventure Book of the Year at the World ITB Awards in Germany.

Since 2007 Lewis-Jones has worked with established and emerging artists: the internationally renowned printmaker Jörg Schmeisser; Bristol-based fine artist Emma Stibbon, Senior Lecturer at the University of Brighton; Nanoq artists Bryndis Snæbjörnsdóttir and Mark Wilson; Tiina Itkonen, Finnish Young Photographer of the Year; bird illustrator John Gale; leading expedition photographer Martin Hartley; and most recently, the forensic installation artist John Kelly. He is currently collaborating with the photographer Nigel Millard, official photographer of the Royal National Lifeboat Institution and the peerless Icelandic photojournalist Ragnar Axelsson.

Lewis-Jones' future exhibitions include Maybe Tomorrow, a photographic journey amongst peoples of the Arctic, and First Across – a project that unites the exploration and scientific achievements of the 1955–58 Commonwealth Trans-Antarctic Expedition, led by Sir Vivian Fuchs, with those of the British Trans-Arctic Expedition of 1968–69, led by Sir Wally Herbert. On this later expedition, a 3,800-mile surface crossing of the Arctic Ocean, from Alaska to Spitsbergen, billed by some as 'the last great journey on Earth', Herbert and his team became, undisputedly, the first men to reach the North Pole by surface travel.

Having opened in Cambridge in 2007, Lewis-Jones' exhibition of Herbert's paintings Art of Exploration was shown in Scotland during 2009 and at the National Geographic gallery in London. His Face to Face: Polar Portraits exhibition was shown in Cambridge, London and Ireland in 2008. It toured to several destinations in 2009, including The Explorers Club in New York and Discovery Point, Dundee, the home of exploration ship RRS Discovery, the first polar command of Robert Falcon Scott.

== Television ==
Lewis-Jones has made many appearances on radio and television. Most recently, Lewis-Jones was onscreen expert with Paul Rose in the BBC Two documentary Antarctica's Forgotten Hero, describing the adventures of polar explorer Frank Wild and the expeditions of the Heroic Age. He has also recently featured on BBC Radio 4 discussing the science of icebergs, and on National Geographic radio broadcasts.

His media career began in developing popular history pieces for Sky Movies. The 4-part film documentary Captain Cook: Obsession and Discovery was screened in 2007 in Australia on ABC and in the United Kingdom on The History Channel. He joined the English author Vanessa Collingridge and naval historian Professor Andrew Lambert.

The documentary Wilderness Explored, produced by Jeremy Bristow, aired on the BBC in October 2008 and received widespread critical acclaim. It was 'Critics Choice' in The Sunday Times, 'Pick of the Week' in The Independent and 'Digital Pick of the Week' in The Telegraph. The Guardian declared it 'a glorious documentary' and The Radio Times described the work as 'an entrancing piece of cultural history'. In 2011, Lewis-Jones provided expert commentary in Robert Murphy's film for BBC Four, Of Ice and Men, alongside Sir Ranulph Fiennes and authors Sara Wheeler and Francis Spufford, tracing the way that Antarctica has captured the imagination over the centuries.

== Bibliography ==
- The Conquest of Everest: Original Photographs from the Legendary First Ascent, George Lowe and Huw Lewis-Jones, London: Thames & Hudson, 2013. ISBN 978-0500544235
- Mountain Heroes: Portraits of Adventure, Huw Lewis-Jones, Conway and Polarworld, 2011. ISBN 978-1-84486-139-2
- Abenteurer Der Berge: 100 Portrats, Huw Lewis-Jones, Frederking & Thaler and GEO, 2011. ISBN 978-3-89405-926-2
- In Search of the South Pole, Kari Herbert and Huw Lewis-Jones, Conway, 2011. ISBN 978-1-84486-137-8
- Entscheidung am Sudpol, Kari Herbert and Huw Lewis-Jones, Theiss, 2011. ISBN 978-3-8062-2555-6
- The Trafalgar Chronicle, Anthony Cross and Huw Lewis-Jones, The 1805 Club, 2011. ISBN 978-1-902392-21-9
- Arctic, Bruce Parry and Huw Lewis-Jones, Conway, 2011. ISBN 978-1-84486-130-9
- Face to Face: Ocean Portraits, Huw Lewis-Jones, Conway and Polarworld, 2010. ISBN 978-1-84486-124-8
- Homes et Femmes De La Mer, Huw Lewis-Jones, Arthaud, 2010. ISBN 978-2-08-123945-6
- The Trafalgar Chronicle, Anthony Cross and Huw Lewis-Jones, The 1805 Club, 2010. ISBN 978-1-902392-20-2
- Votli Polari: Uomini Che Hanno Sfidato I Ghiacci, Huw Lewis-Jones, De Agostini, 2009. ISBN 978-88-418-5842-4
- Abenteurer Im Eis: Portrats 1845-Heute, Huw Lewis-Jones, Frederking & Thaler and GEO, 2009. ISBN 978-3-89405-752-7
- Face to Face: Polar Portraits, Huw Lewis-Jones, Conway and Polarworld, 2009. ISBN 978-1-84486-099-9
- The Trafalgar Chronicle, Anthony Cross and Huw Lewis-Jones, The 1805 Club, 2009. ISBN 978-1-902392-19-6
- Face to Face: Polar Portraits, Huw Lewis-Jones, Scott Polar Research Institute and Polarworld, 2008. ISBN 978-0-901021-07-6
- The Trafalgar Chronicle, Anthony Cross and Huw Lewis-Jones, The 1805 Club, 2008. ISBN 978-1902392189
- The Trafalgar Chronicle, Anthony Cross and Huw Lewis-Jones, The 1805 Club, 2007. ISBN 978-1-902392-16-5
- The Trafalgar Chronicle, Anthony Cross and Huw Lewis-Jones, The 1805 Club, 2006. ISBN 978-1-902392-15-8
- The Trafalgar Chronicle, Anthony Cross and Huw Lewis-Jones, The 1805 Club, 2005. ISBN 978-1-902392-14-1
- The Writer's Map: An Atlas of Imaginary Lands, Huw Lewis-Jones, Philip Pullman, University of Chicago Press, 2018. ISBN 978-0-226-59663-1
- Imagining the Arctic, Huw-Lewis-Jones, I.B. Tauris, 2017. ISBN 978-1-78453-658-9
- Carnets d'explorateurs, Huw-Lewis-Jones et Kari Herbert, éditions Paulsen, 2016
- Carnets de marins, Huw-Lewis-Jones et Kari Herbert, éditions Paulsen, 2019
