= Aardvark (2010 film) =

- Directed by: Kitao Sakurai
- Written by: Kitao Sakurai
- Produced by: Andrew Barchilon
- Starring: Kitao Sakurai
- Cinematography: Aaron Kovalchik
- Edited by: Luke Lynch
- Music by: Fall On Your Sword
- Release date: August 5, 2010 (Locarno)
- Running time: 80 minutes
- Countries: United States; Argentina
- Language: English

Aardvark is a 2010 American-Argentine crime thriller film written and directed by and starring Kitao Sakurai.

== Cast ==
- Larry L. Lewis Jr. as Larry
- Darren Branch as Darren
- Jessica Elizabeth Cole as Candy
- Dutch Crouse as Detective Dutch
- Andris Brunovskis as Darren's Friends
- Kitao Sakurai as Darius Szopa

== Production ==
The film was shot in Cleveland, Ohio.

== Release ==
The film premiered at the Locarno Film Festival on August 5, 2010.

== Reception ==
Ard Vjin of Screen Anarchy gave the film a negative review and wrote, "The documentary parts are interesting enough but in my opinion the thriller parts lets the film down by poor plotting and acting."

Michael Nordine of Film Threat gave the film a positive review and wrote, "Through these two men, Aardvark reveals itself as a film whose primary focus isn't adaptability (as the implied metaphor of its title might suggest) but rather the ways in which strength and weakness pull us in opposing directions, as well as our unfortunate tendency to be more swayed by the latter."
