= Nobile Glacier =

Glacier in Antarctica

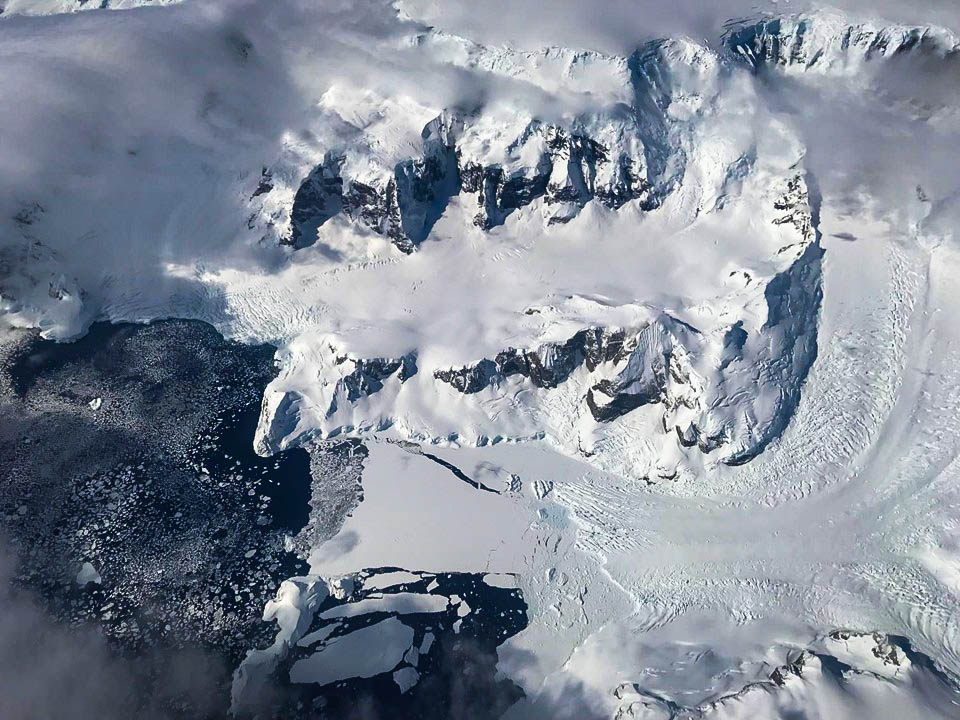
Nobile Glacier

Nobile Glacier (64°32′S 61°28′W) is a glacier flowing into the southeast part of Recess Cove, Charlotte Bay, on the west coast of Graham Land. Charted by the Belgian Antarctic Expedition under Gerlache, 1897–99. it was photographed from the air by FIDASE and surveyed from the ground by Falkland Islands Dependencies Survey from Portal Point, 1956–58.

Named by the United Kingdom Antarctic Place-Names Committee (UK-APC) in 1960 for Umberto Nobile, Italian designer of the rigid airships Norge and respectively. Glacier is located in the closest part of Antarctica to South America.
