= Bozhinov Glacier =

Glacier in Antarctica

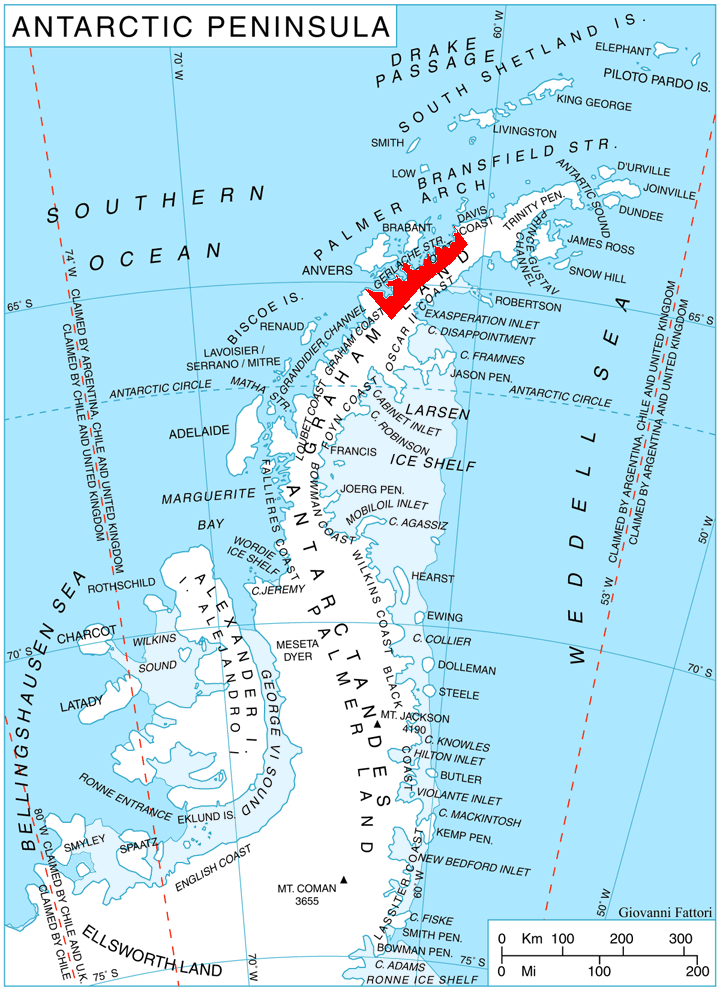
- Location of Danco Coast on the Antarctic Peninsula

- Location within Antarctica
- Location: Graham Land
- Coordinates: 64°36′30″S 61°27′30″W
- Length: 5 km (3.1 mi)
- Width: 2.5 km (1.6 mi)
- Thickness: unknown
- Highest elevation: 827 m (2,713 ft)
- Terminus: Gerlache Strait
- Status: unknown

Bozhinov Glacier (Bulgarian: Божинов ледник, romanized: Bozhinov lednik, IPA: [boˈʒinof ˈlɛdnik]) is the 5 km long and 2.5 km wide glacier on Danco Coast in Graham Land on the Antarctic Peninsula situated north of Krebs Glacier and south of Nobile Glacier. Flowing westwards to enter Gerlache Strait at Kapisturia Cove in Charlotte Bay.

The glacier is named for the Bulgarian pioneer of aviation Georgi Bozhinov (1879-1955) whose innovative aircraft was patented in France in 1912.

== Location ==
Bozhinov Glacier is located at 64°36′30″S 61°27′30″W. British mapping in 1978.

== See also ==
- List of glaciers in the Antarctic
- Glaciology

== Maps ==
- British Antarctic Territory. Scale 1:200000 topographic map No. 3198. DOS 610 - W 64 60. Tolworth, UK, 1978.
- Antarctic Digital Database (ADD). Scale 1:250000 topographic map of Antarctica. Scientific Committee on Antarctic Research (SCAR). Since 1993, regularly upgraded and updated.
