= The Waist =

The Waist (64°38′S 61°24′W) is the narrow neck of land between Herbert Plateau and Foster Plateau in northern Graham Land. Photographed by the Falkland Islands and Dependencies Aerial Survey Expedition (FIDASE) in 1956-57 and mapped from these photos by the Falkland Islands Dependencies Survey (FIDS). So named by the United Kingdom Antarctic Place-Names Committee (UK-APC) in 1960.
