= Eurydice Peninsula =

Mostly ice-covered peninsula in Antarctica

- Location within Antarctica

Geography
- Location: Charlotte Bay
- Coordinates: 64°33′50″S 61°31′40″W

Eurydice Peninsula (64°33′50″S 61°31′40″W) is a predominantly ice-covered 8 kilometres (5.0 mi) wide peninsula projecting from Danco Coast, Antarctic Peninsula 7.4 kilometres (4.6 mi) northwestwards into Charlotte Bay south of Recess Cove. It ends in Sepúlveda Point to the north and Meusnier Point to the west.

== Location ==
Danco Coast, Antarctic Peninsula. Eurydice Peninsula in center

Eurydice Peninsula lies on the west coast of the Antarctic Peninsula. It extends in a northwest direction into Charlotte Bay. Recess Cove is to the north, and Pefaur Peninsula is north of Recess Cove. Herbert Plateau is to the southeast. Nobile Glacier flows along its northeast side into Recess Cove. Bozhinov Glacier flows along its southwest side into Kapisturia Cove.

== Name ==
The Eurydice Peninsula is named after Eurydice, the mythical wife of the Thracian singer Orpheus.

== Features ==
=== Sepúlveda Point ===
64°31′S 61°35′W. The south entrance point of Recess Cove. The feature was named "Punta Sepulveda" by the Chilean Antarctic Expedition, 1952, after Teniente (Lieutenant) Hernán Sepulveda Gore, of the patrol ship Lientur which worked in the area.

=== Meusnier Point ===
64°33′S 61°38′W. Point within Charlotte Bay, lying 4 nautical miles (7.4 km; 4.6 mi) southeast of Portal Point. Charted by the Belgian Antarctic Expedition (BelgAE) under Adrien de Gerlache (1897-99). Named by the UK Antarctic Place-Names Committee (UK-APC) in 1960 for Jean Baptiste Meusnier (1754-93), French military engineer and prophetic designer of the first dirigible airship, in 1785.

=== Bonev Peak ===
64°33′25″S 61°33′30″W A mostly ice-covered peak of elevation 850 metres (2,790 ft) high on Eurydice Peninsula. Situated 3.9 kilometres (2.4 mi) southeast of Meusnier Point and 4.77 kilometres (2.96 mi) northwest of Mitkaloto Peak. Steep and partly ice-free east and northwest slopes. Surmounts Charlotte Bay to the southwest and west, its easterly part Recess Cove to the north, and Nobile Glacier to the northeast. Named after Kamen Bonev, geologist and mountain guide at St. Kliment Ohridski base in 1998/99 and subsequent seasons.

=== Mitkaloto Peak ===
64°35′40″S 61°30′35″W A rocky, partly ice-free peak rising to 1,200 metres (3,900 ft) high on the east coast of Charlotte Bay. Situated next north-northwest of the terminus of Bozhinov Glacier. Named after the Bulgarian enlightener and revolutionary Matey Preobrazhenski - "Mitkaloto" (Mono Seizmonov, 1828-1875).

=== Bozhinov Glacier ===
64°36′30″S 61°27′30″W A 5 kilometres (3.1 mi) long and 2.5 kilometres (1.6 mi) wide glacier on Danco Coast situated north of Krebs Glacier and south of Nobile Glacier. Flowing westwards to enter Gerlache Strait at Charlotte Bay. Named for the Bulgarian pioneer of aviation Georgi Bozhinov (1879-1955) whose innovative aircraft was patented in France in 1912.

=== Kapisturia Cove ===
64°36′35″S 61°30′30″W A 1.65 kilometres (1.03 mi) wide cove indenting Danco Coast for 1.9 kilometres (1.2 mi) just south of Eurydice Peninsula. Part of Charlotte Bay. Its head is fed by Bozhinov Glacier. Named after the ancient fortress of Kapisturia in Southern Bulgaria.

== Sources ==
- Alberts, Fred G., ed. (1995), Geographic Names of the Antarctic (PDF) (2 ed.), United States Board on Geographic Names This article incorporates public domain material from websites or documents of the United States Board on Geographic Names.
- "Bonev Peak", Composite Gazetteer of Antarctica, Scientific Committee on Antarctic Research
- "Bozhinov Glacier", Composite Gazetteer of Antarctica, Scientific Committee on Antarctic Research
- "Eurydice Peninsula", Composite Gazetteer of Antarctica, Scientific Committee on Antarctic Research
- Graham Land and South Shetland Islands, BAS: British Antarctic Survey, 2005
- "Kapisturia Cove", Composite Gazetteer of Antarctica, Scientific Committee on Antarctic Research
- "Mitkaloto Peak", Composite Gazetteer of Antarctica, Scientific Committee on Antarctic Research
