= Angry Planet =

- Created by: Peter Rowe, George Kourounis
- Starring: George Kourounis
- Country of origin: Canada
- No. of episodes: 39

Production
- Running time: Half-hour episodes (23 minutes)

Original release
- Network: OLN
- Release: 6 March 2007 – 2016

Angry Planet is a 39-part television series broadcast around the world featuring the adventures of storm chaser George Kourounis. Angry Planet is produced by Peter Rowe of Pinewood Films. The series plays on the following networks:

- Pivot TV (US)
- Outdoor Life Network (Canada)
- The Weather Network (Canada)
- Travel Channel (Europe, Romania)
- Weather Channel (Australia)
- TV8 (Sweden)
- MTV3 (Finland)
- Canal Evasion (Quebec)
- TVB (Hong Kong)
- WeatherSpy (International)

The first season of the series has also been released on DVD as a box set.

Each episode focuses on a different force of nature as Kourounis gets up close to investigate and document the most fierce natural phenomena the Earth has to dish out.

== Seasons ==
=== Season One ===
- Tornadoes
- Winds of Autumn
- Wild Weather Season
- Yukon Wildfires
- African Hellhole
- Desert Monsoon
- Volcanic Wedding
- Avalanches
- Blizzards
- Sailing around Cape Horn
- Rope traverse of the Boiling Lake
- Wild Water
- Midwest Stormfest

=== Season Two ===
- Island Caving
- Hurricanes
- Waterspouts
- Hawaii Surf & Snow
- Thunder Down Under
- Hottest & Coldest
- Italia Wild
- West Coast Winter Weather
- Iceland - Fire & Ice
- Timbuktu - Birthplace of Hurricanes
- Indian Monsoon
- Java - Land of Fire
- Indonesia

=== Season Three ===
- Hurricane Triple Threat
- Elephant Cave
- Soviet Eco-Disasters
- Costa Rica
- Antarctica
- Arctic Winter
- Newest Land on Earth
- Highway to Hail
- Defying Gravity
- Under Pressure
- Crystal Cave
- Venezuela Lightning
- Empty Quarter Arabia

The series was produced from 2006 to 2016.

== Awards ==
- George Kourounis was nominated twice for a Gemini Award for Best Host for the series.
- Peter Rowe was nominated for a Gemini Award for Best Direction in a Reality Show.
- Peter Rowe won a Canadian Society of Cinematographers (CSC) Award for Best Cinematography in a Reality/Lifestyle Show for the series in 2010.
