= Dora Boneva =

Bulgarian painter

- Born: 11 April 1936 (age 89); Gabrovo, Bulgaria
- Known for: Painter

Dora Boneva (Bulgarian: Дора Бонева, born 11 April 1936) is a Bulgarian painter. She was born in Gabrovo, Bulgaria, and lives in Sofia, Bulgaria.

== Life ==
Boneva was born in 1936 and she received her master's degree from the Academy of Fine Arts in Sofia. She studied painting under the guidance of the academician Dechko Uzunov. She took part in many national art exhibitions and in numerous Bulgarian art presentations in foreign countries. She has won awards from the Union of Bulgarian Artists, from the government of Sofia, from the Institut Culturel de Solenzara in Paris, a silver medal from the French Academy of Fine Arts. Since 1981 she has been a corresponding member of the European Academy of Sciences, Art, and Literature, with head office in Paris. In 1989, 1990 and 1993, Boneva took part in the Autumn Salon in Paris. She was selected as artist-in-residence by the Griffis Art center in New London, CT, USA in 1994–1995.

Boneva has three paintings in the collection of Newnham College, Cambridge.
