= Aardwolf (disambiguation) =

The aardwolf is a mammal in the hyena family.

Aardwolf may also refer to:

- Aardwolf (CIA report), a report about a country's status discussed in State of War: The Secret History of the CIA and the Bush Administration
- Aardwolf (comics), a Marvel Comics character
- Aardwolf Publishing, a publishing company founded by Clifford Meth

== See also ==
- Aardvark
