= George Kourounis =

Canadian storm chaser (born 1970)

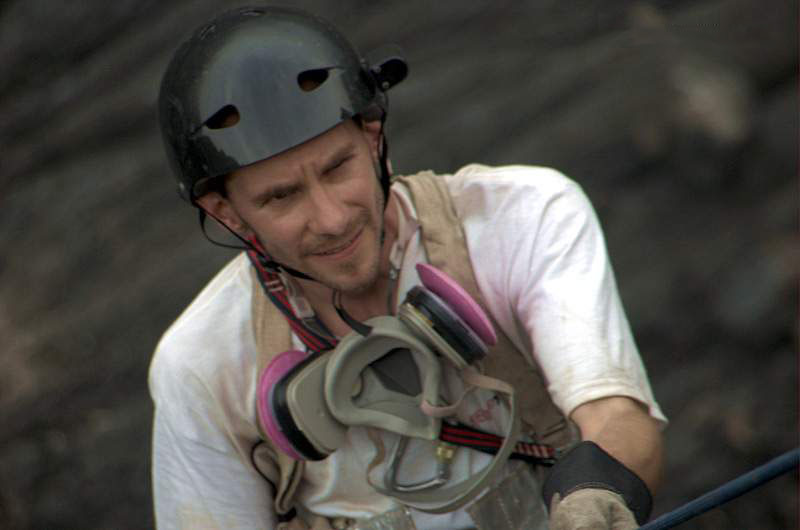
- Born: 22 May 1970 (age 56); Hull, Quebec, Canada
- Occupations: professional adventurer, storm chaser, motivational speaker, television presenter
- Website: Stormchaser.ca

George Kourounis (born 22 May 1970), is a Greek-Canadian adventurer and storm chaser who specializes in documenting extreme weather and worldwide natural disasters. He presents the television series Angry Planet.

== Storm chasing ==
Kourounis has been a storm chaser since 1997 and documents all forms of severe weather including tornadoes, hurricanes, blizzards, floods, hail, and lightning.

In January 2005 Kourounis brought his camera to the remote Danakil Depression in the harsh Ethiopian desert and was lowered 60 ft (18 m) into the smoking crater of the active Erta Ale volcano. He spent a half hour filming on top of the freshly hardened surface of the lava lake wearing a protective heat suit.

He has documented four major U.S. land falling hurricanes in 2005, including Hurricane Katrina in Gulfport, Mississippi.

== Other Accomplishments ==
Some of his other accomplishments include documenting mountain gorillas in Rwanda, climbing Mount Nyiragongo volcano in the Democratic Republic of Congo, and documenting numerous destructive tornadoes across the United States. He has also filmed forest fires and great white sharks. In 2006 he and his wife Michelle were married on the crater’s edge of the erupting Mount Yasur volcano on the island of Tanna in Vanuatu. The ceremony was documented for his television series Angry Planet. On 6 November 2013 he was the first person to enter the Darvaza gas crater in Turkmenistan (a burning natural gas field known as the "Gates of Hell").

Kourounis does stints as a tour guide for Cloud 9 Tours.

== Television ==
Kourounis entered television work with numerous appearances in weather documentary programs featuring severe weather and natural disasters. Kourounis has been a guest on television programs, including CTV Newsnet, CNN's Anderson Cooper 360, BBC-TV, and Discovery Channel’s Daily Planet.

=== Angry Planet ===
Kourounis co-created and hosts a television series titled Angry Planet for OLN in Canada, The Travel Channel worldwide, and The Weather Channel in Australia.

The series features Kourounis traveling to dangerous or remote locations and examining various extreme forces of nature, typically at close range. The series premiered in March 2007 and 39 episodes were produced.

The show has featured Kourounis participating in such adventures as tornado chasing, rappelling into erupting volcanoes, driving into the eye of hurricanes, enduring extremes of heat and cold and boating on a lake of sulfuric acid at Ijen in Indonesia. Kourounis often teams up with scientists or local experts who assist in the adventures. Filming has taken place on all seven continents.

Kourounis was nominated for Gemini awards in 2008 and 2009 for his work hosting Angry Planet.

=== Storm Hunters ===
Kourounis co-hosted and was the director of photography on three episodes of the television series Storm Hunters which was produced for The Canadian Weather Network. The series chronicled the adventures of Kourounis and Weather Network meteorologist Mark Robinson as the duo traveled across Canada documenting winter weather.

The East Coast episode was filmed on location in Nova Scotia, including Peggys Cove and the Cape Breton Highlands, along the Cabot Trail.

The Western episode showcased avalanche control crews that work in the mountain ranges of British Columbia, bringing down unstable snow using explosives. The pair also experienced extreme temperatures of -110 degrees Celsius (-166F) inside a specially designed cold sauna. This was lower than the coldest temperature ever recorded anywhere on Earth.

The Arctic episode involved a road trip to north of the Arctic Circle, through the Yukon Territory and along the Dempster Highway in mid-winter to Inuvik in the Northwest Territories where they then took to the ice roads and eventually made it to the northernmost point in Canada that can be driven to. The last section of the ice road was on the frozen Beaufort Sea. The journey ended in the small village of Tuktoyaktuk.
