= Wally Herbert =

British polar explorer

Sir Wally Herbert
- Born: 24 October 1934; York, England
- Died: 12 June 2007 (aged 72); Inverness, Scotland
- Occupations: Explorer, writer, artist
- Known for: Polar exploration
- Notable work: The Noose of Laurels

Sir Walter William Herbert (24 October 1934 – 12 June 2007) was a British polar explorer, writer and artist. In 1969 he became the first man fully recognized for walking to the North Pole, on the 60th anniversary of Robert Peary's disputed expedition. He was described by Sir Ranulph Fiennes as "the greatest polar explorer of our time".

During the course of his polar career, which spanned more than 50 years, he spent 15 years in the wilderness regions of the polar world. He travelled with dog teams and open boats well over 23,000 miles; more than half of that distance through unexplored areas.

Among his several books, which he illustrated, were works dealing with polar exploration. He also had solo exhibitions of his drawings and paintings. In 2000 he was knighted for his polar achievements.

== Early life and career ==
Walter Herbert was born into an army family in England who emigrated to Egypt on assignment when he was three. They moved on to South Africa for nine years. He studied at the Royal School of Military Survey, then spent 18 months surveying in Egypt and Cyprus. He travelled back to England through Turkey and Greece, drawing portraits for his board and lodging.

In 1955, when Herbert was 21, he carried out surveying in the Antarctic with the Falkland Islands Dependencies Survey, during which he became an expert in dog sleighing. On one journey along the Antarctic Peninsula he sledged from Hope Bay to Portal Point. This experience with dogs led him to a job with the New Zealand Antarctic programme, which commissioned him to purchase dogs in Greenland for the Antarctic. There he learnt Inuit methods of dog driving.

As leader of an exploration party in the early 1960s, Herbert surveyed a large area of the Queen Maud range and followed Shackleton (1908) and Scott's (1911) route up the Beardmore Glacier. Denied a request to proceed to the South Pole, his party ascended Mount Nansen and descended a route taken by Amundsen in 1911, thus being the first to retrace these explorers' traverses. In 1964 he trekked the routes taken by Sverdrup and Cook from Greenland to Ellesmere Island in the Arctic.

== British Trans-Arctic Expedition ==
From 1968 to 1969, Herbert led the British Trans-Arctic Expedition, a 3,800-mile overland crossing of the Arctic Ocean, from Alaska to Spitsbergen, which some historians had billed as "the last great journey on Earth." In July 1968, having crossed 1,900 km (1200 miles) of rough drifting ice, Herbert and his team (Allan Gill, Roy Koerner, and Kenneth Hedges) established a camp. Because they could not reach a position where the drift of the trans-Arctic ice-stream was in their favour, they were forced to stay for the winter, as they drifted around the pole. Only when sunlight returned the following year could they continue their journey, finally reaching the North Pole via the Pole of Inaccessibility on 6 April 1969. Their feat was recognised by the Prime Minister, Harold Wilson, as "a feat of endurance and courage which ranks with any in polar history", and which Prince Philip stated "ranks among the greatest triumphs of human skill and endurance".

In recognition of his polar achievements, Herbert received several honours and awards: among them the Polar Medal and bar; the Founders' Medal of the Royal Geographical Society, the gold medals of several Geographical Societies, and the Explorers Medal of the Explorers Club. He has a mountain range and a plateau named after him in the Antarctic; the most northerly mountain in Svalbard named after him in the Arctic.

== Later life ==
When he returned to London in 1969 he married Marie Herbert. Together they lived with the Inuit and Saami in Greenland, Norway and Sweden. They had two daughters who travelled with them; their elder daughter is Kari Herbert.

Between 1979 and 1981 Herbert and Allan Gill attempted to circumnavigate Greenland by dog sled and umiak, a traditional boat. It was planned to take 16 months to cover the 13,000 km (8000 miles) but poor weather made it impossible. Near Loch Fyne, Herbert wrote:

We were forced to take to the land and haul the sledges across steaming tundra and rock bare of snow, swollen rivers, baked mud flats, sand-dunes, swamps and stagnant pools. We were blasted by duststorms and eaten alive by mosquitoes

Wally Herbert died in Inverness on 12 June 2007.

== Author and artist ==
Herbert was a prize-winning author and an artist and had one-man shows in London, New York and Sydney. He wrote a number of books and drew some of the first landscapes of the North Pole, in his early exploration days. He illustrated all of his books, and his paintings and drawings received critical acclaim. Some of Herbert's own famous pieces can be found on his website.

Herbert was drawn by Andrew James. One of the only known portraits of Herbert, the work was given by him as a gift to fellow explorer Andrew Regan.

== Peary controversy ==
Herbert's research challenged Robert Peary's claim to have reached the North Pole in 1909. The National Geographic Society, which had supported Peary's original expedition, hired Herbert to assess a 1909 diary and astronomical observations, which had not been accessible to researchers for decades. Herbert concluded that the explorer had not reached the Pole and must have falsified the records. His book, The Noose of Laurels: The Race to the North Pole (1989), caused a furore when it was published, and its conclusion is widely debated. The Foundation for the Promotion of the Art of Navigation, commissioned by the National Geographic Society to resolve the issue, disagreed, and concluded that Peary had indeed reached the Pole. Since then the National Geographic Society has come to accept Herbert's version of events.

== Legacy and honours ==
- Herbert was knighted in 2000.
- After his 1969 achievement in reaching the pole, he was awarded the Polar Medal and bar; the Founders' Medal of the Royal Geographical Society, the gold medals of several Geographical Societies, and the Explorers Medal of the Explorers Club.
- A mountain range and a plateau were named after him in the Antarctic.
- The most northerly mountain in Svalbard, an Arctic archipelago, was named after him.

== Bibliography of his works ==
- The Polar World: The Unique Vision of Sir Wally Herbert, 2007 (collection of his artwork)
- The Noose of Laurels: The Race to the North Pole, 1989 (published as The Noose of Laurels: Robert E. Peary and the Race to the North Pole by Atheneum Books in the US)
- Hunters of the Polar North: Eskimos, 1981
- Eskimos, 1976 (won the 1977 Deutscher Jugendliteraturpreis)
- North Pole, 1978
- Polar Deserts, 1971
- Across the Top of the World, 1969
- A World of Men: Exploration in Antarctica, 1963/reprint 1969
