= Recess Cove =

Recess Cove (64°30′S 61°32′W) is a cove 2.5 nautical miles (4.6 km) wide in the east side of Charlotte Bay, along the west coast of Graham Land. Surveyed by the Falkland Islands Dependencies Survey (FIDS), this cove forms a recess in the side of Charlotte Bay.
