= Portal Point =

Narrow point in the northeast part of Reclus Peninsula

Cape Reclus Refuge
- Refuge
- Location of Cape Reclus in Antarctic Peninsula
- Coordinates: 64°30′00″S 61°46′00″W
- Country: United Kingdom
- Location in Antarctica: Cape Reclus; Portal Point; Antarctica
- Administered by: British Antarctic Survey
- Established: 1956
- Demolished: 1958
- Type: Seasonal
- Status: Dismantled

Portal Point (64°30′S 61°46′W) is a narrow point in the northeast part of Reclus Peninsula, on the west coast of Graham Land. In 1956, a Falkland Islands Dependencies Survey (FIDS) hut was established on the point, from which a route to the plateau was established. Portal Point was so named by the United Kingdom Antarctic Place-Names Committee (UK-APC) in 1960 because it is the gateway of that route.

== Cape Reclus Refuge ==
Cape Reclus Refuge (64°30′00″S 61°46′00″W) is a British refuge, originally managed by the British Antarctic Survey, that was located at Portal Point on the Reclus Peninsula. The hut was inaugurated on 13 December 1956 and remained active until April 25, 1958. A four-man team, led by Wally Herbert, completed the first traverse from Hope Bay to Cape Reclus in 1957; they wintered in the refuge and carried out a local survey. The refuge was dismantled in March 1996 and transported to the Falkland Islands Museum and National Trust, where was rebuilt inside the new museum in 2014.

== Biology ==
Portal point often has Weddell seals hauled out near the landing. There are no penguin colonies because of the abundant snow cover.

== Geology ==
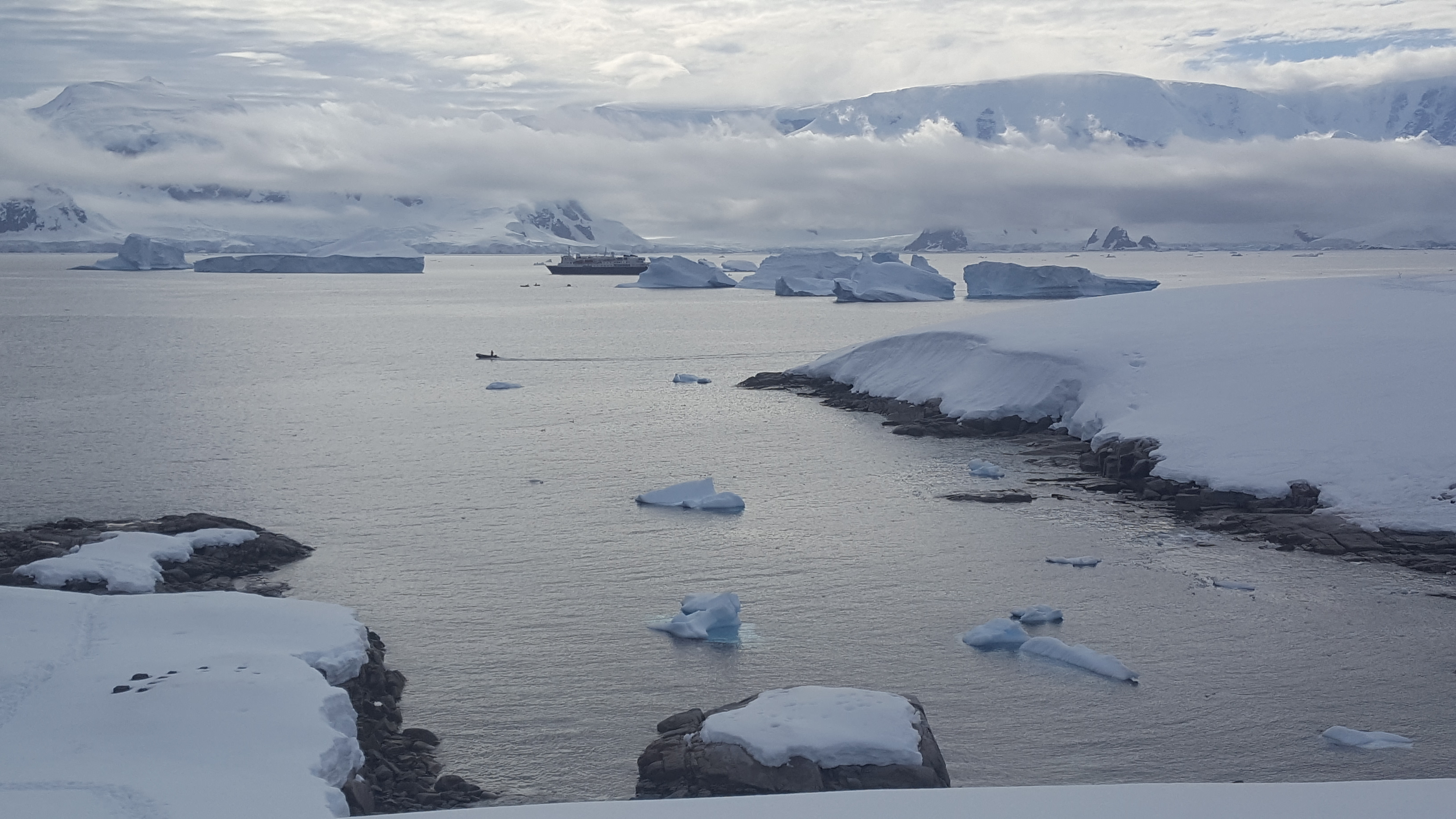

Portal Point is a snow- and ice-covered point consisting of Mesozoic granite.

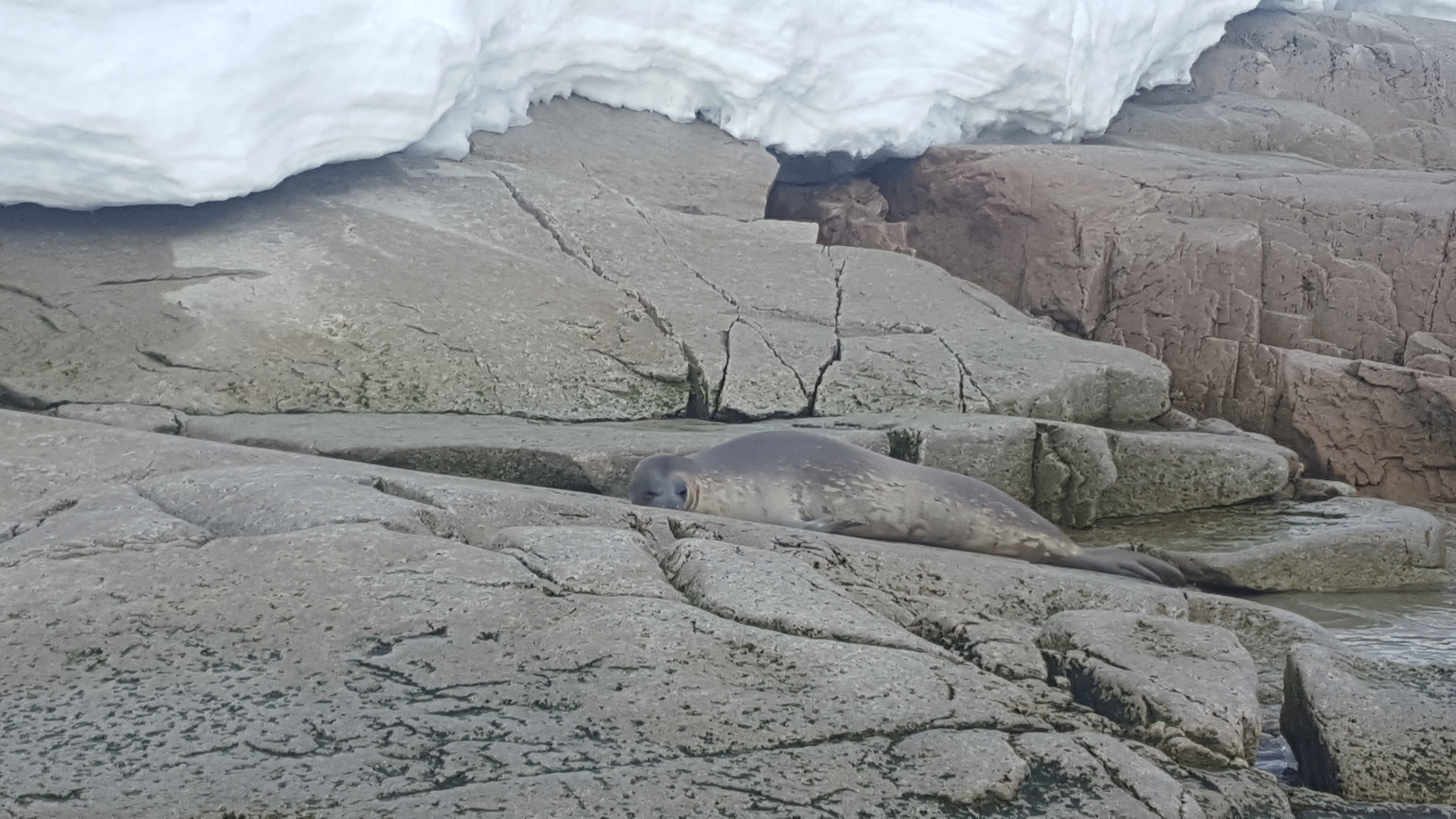

== See also ==
- List of Antarctic field camps
