= Charlotte Bay =

Bay on the west coast of the Antarctic Peninsula

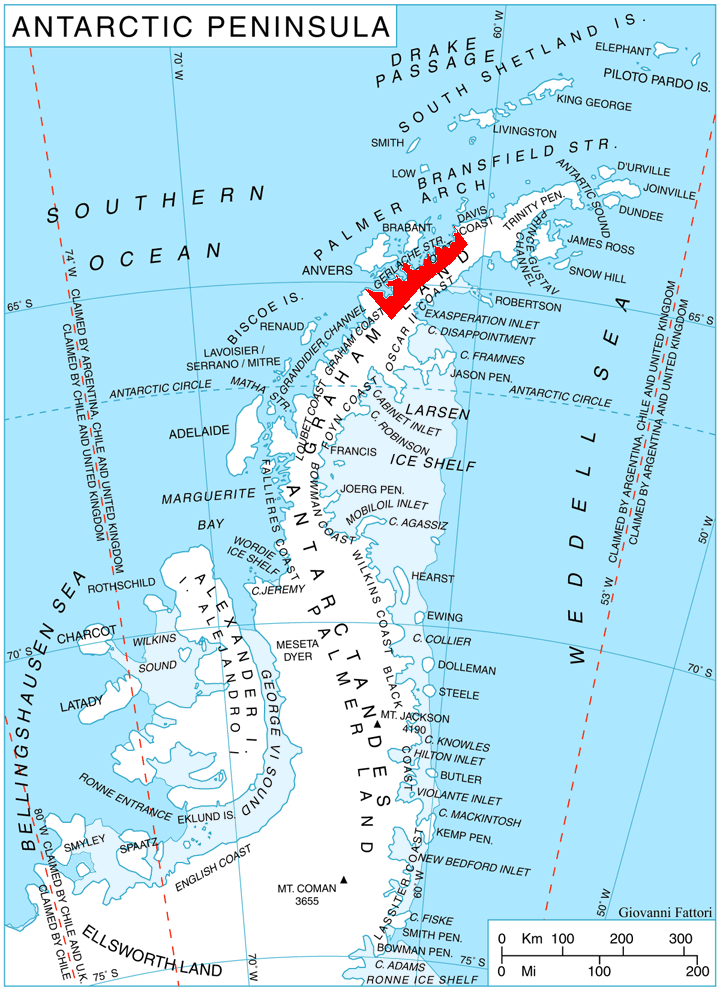
Location of Danco Coast on the Antarctic Peninsula.

Charlotte Bay is a bay on the west coast of the Antarctic Peninsula indenting the west coast of Graham Land in a southeast direction for 12 nautical miles (22 km), between Reclus Peninsula and Cape Murray. Its head is fed by the glaciers Nobile, Bozhinov, Krebs, Wellman and Renard.

The bay was discovered by Adrien de Gerlache during the 1897–99 Belgian Antarctic Expedition and named after Charlotte Dumeiz, the fiancée of Georges Lecointe, Gerlache's executive officer, hydrographer and second-in-command of the expedition.

== Charlotte Bay hut ==
A Falkland Islands Dependency Survey (British Antarctic Survey from 1962) hut was built at Portal Point (64°30′0″S 61°45′58″W), between Brabant Island and the Danco Coast.

In the 1956–57 season, Wally Herbert, leader of a later British expedition, mapped the area from Hope Bay, and arrived at the Charlotte Bay hut for a scheduled pick up by the Shackleton. With no radio, Herbert had no way of knowing that the Shackleton had hit an iceberg and was returning to the Falkland Islands for repairs. The six men and their dogs were forced to stay in the hut for about three months without knowing their fate, and with diminishing food supplies.

== Maps ==
- Antarctic Digital Database (ADD). Scale 1:250000 topographic map of Antarctica. Scientific Committee on Antarctic Research (SCAR), 1993–2016.
