= Brown Station =

Brown Station Estación Científica Almirante Brown Base Brown Estación Brown
- Antarctic base
- Brown Scientific Station
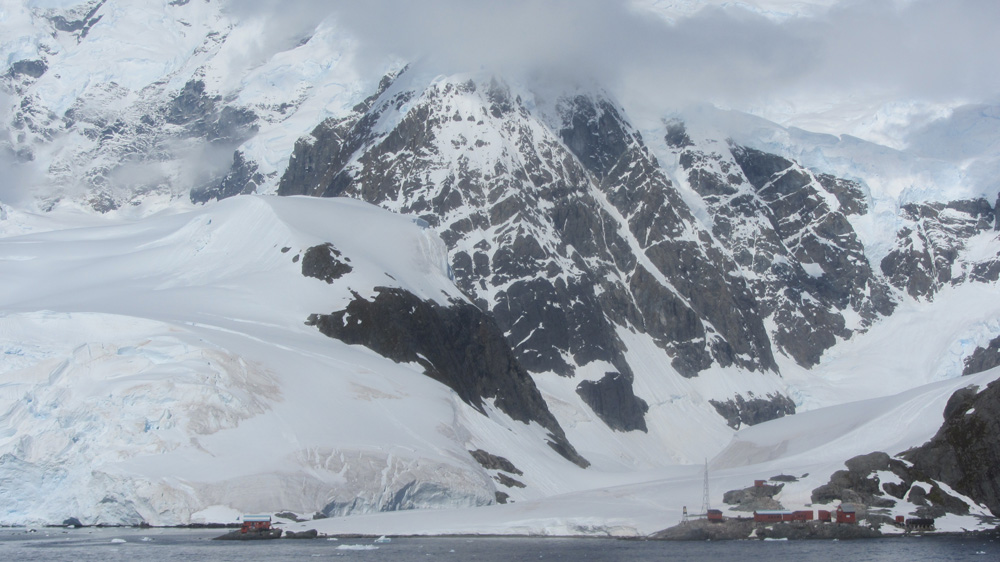
- Brown in the austral summer of 2014

- Location within Antarctic Peninsula
- Coordinates: 64°53′44″S 62°52′15″W
- Country: Argentina
- Province: Tierra del Fuego, Antarctica, and South Atlantic Islands Province
- Department: Antártida Argentina
- Region: Graham Land; Antarctic Peninsula
- Location: Sanavirón Peninsula; Paradise Harbor; Danco Coast
- Established: April 6, 1951 (1950–51 austral summer season)
- Named after: William Brown

Government
  - Type: Directorate
  - Body: Dirección Nacional del Antártico
  - Operator: Instituto Antártico Argentino

Area
  - Total: 1.4 ha (3.5 acres)
- Elevation: 22 m (72 ft)

Population (2017)
  - Summer: 12
  - Winter: 0
- Time zone: UTC-3 (ART)
- Type: Seasonal
- Period: Summer
- Status: Operational
- Activities: List: Biology; Bacteriology; Limnology; Oceanography
- Facilities: List: Main house; Radio station; Power plant; Warehouse and deposits

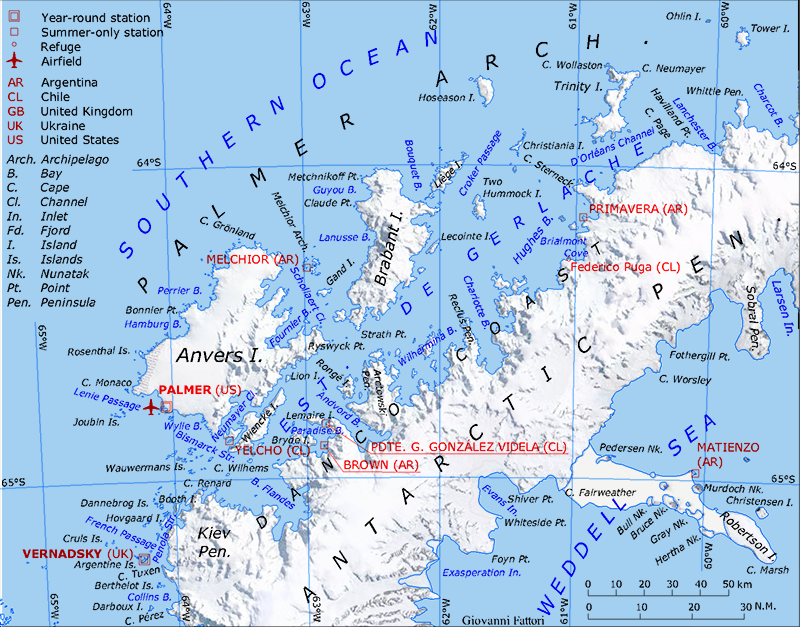
Map of Gerlache Strait region, Cartographic base: Antarctic Digital Database www.add.scar.org/

Brown Station (Spanish: Estación Científica Almirante Brown, or more often Base Brown or Estación Brown) is an Argentine Antarctic base and scientific research station named after Admiral William Brown, the father of the Argentine Navy. It is located on Sanavirón Peninsula along Paradise Harbor, Danco Coast, in Graham Land, Antarctic Peninsula.

As of 2014 Brown is one of 13 research bases in Antarctica operated by Argentina. From 1951 to 1984 it served as a permanent base; since then it is open during the summer season only.

== History ==
Brown Station dates to 6 April 1951, when Argentina established the Almirante Brown Naval Detachment at Paradise Harbor.

The Argentine Antarctic Institute took over the station in 1964–65, creating one of the most complete biology laboratories on the Antarctic Peninsula. It included a main house of 292 m^{2} (3,140 sq ft); two folding 30,000 L (6,600 imp gal; 7,900 US gal) fuel tanks; and an additional building exclusive for scientific research, equipped with three labs, photography workshop, emergency radio station, office and library. It was called Almirante Brown Research Station and inaugurated on 17 February 1965.

Brown Station's original facilities were burned down by the station's doctor on 12 April 1984 after he was ordered to stay for the winter. Station personnel were rescued by the ship USS Hero and taken to United States’s Palmer Station.

Argentina rebuilt the base but it was demoted to summer-only status. During the summer campaign of 1995–96 the Logistics Department of the Argentine National Antarctic Directorate built two new habitable modules: a laboratory and a house with amenities. In the 1999–2000 campaign the Directorate built a new main house capable of comfortably accommodating 8 people; the new building consists of 4 bedrooms, kitchen and 2 bathrooms.

Brown slipped into several years of inactivity during the 2000s decade but since 2007 is occupied during the summer again.

== Conscripto Ortiz Refuge ==
Refuge Conscripto Ortiz (64°53′43″S 62°51′57″W) is an Argentine refuge in Antarctica located 230 meters from the Brown Station. The refuge was opened on January 29, 1956, and it is administered by the Argentine Navy. His name pays homage to the conscript Mario Inocencio Ortíz who died, on March 15, during the Argentine Antarctic campaign of 1954–1955 in service aboard the transport ship ARA Bahía Aguirre. The detachment worked as a meteorological observatory and as a base for Antarctic campaigns until it was temporarily closed in 1960.

== Description ==
Paradise Harbor is a large sea inlet southwest of Andvord Bay protected by an arc formed by the Lemaire, Cramer and Bryde islands. Along the harbor's deep water coast lies the small Sanavirón Peninsula, a rocky promontory crowned by a mound of almost 70 m (230 ft) high called Punta Proa, where the base facilities are located.

In the area there are several beacons to help ship guidance: Punta Proa, in the homonymous place; Punta Vidt in General Ricchieri Cove; Punta Conesa, on the entrance to Puerto Leith; Hanka islet on the homonymous place in Paradise Harbor; Punta Piedras in Oscar Cove; and the lighthouse on Cramer Island.

Brown is located 1,100 km (680 mi) from Ushuaia, the nearest port city.

As of 2014 the base spans a total area of 1.4 ha (14,000 m^{2}; 150,000 sq ft). It can house a maximum of 12 people.

=== Scientific activities ===
Research programs were developed for biology (zoology and botany), bacteriology, limnology, biochemistry, animal and human physiology, pathology, ecology, oceanography, meteorology, cosmic rays and ionospheric observations, environmental nuclear radiation, continental and sea ice glaciology, satellite geodesy, geology, geophysics, seismology, ozone monitoring and tide measurement. Throughout the years of research and observations at Brown, more than 100 scientific papers were published by the Argentine Antarctic Institute.

=== Tourism ===
Thanks to its location on the Antarctica continent along the beautiful Paradise Harbor and to its relatively mild weather, Brown Station is a popular excursion destination for tourist expedition ships visiting Antarctica. In addition to visiting gentoo penguins, tourists may climb to a viewpoint 84 m (276 ft) above the station. Rather than walking down the steep slope, many visitors use the human bobsled course. All those visitors sledding downhill have created a ditch a few feet deep that makes for excellent sledding.

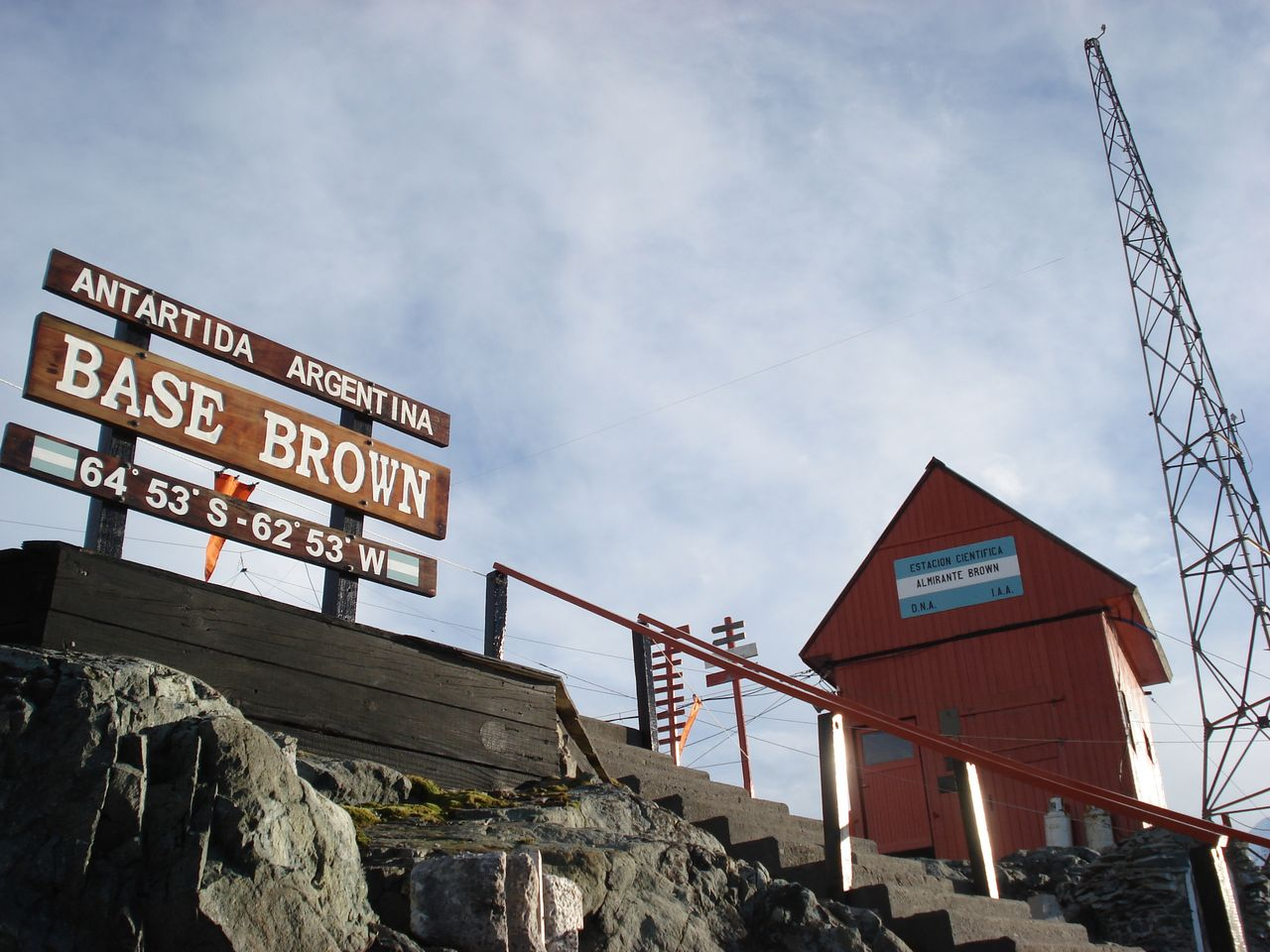
Brown's main entrance

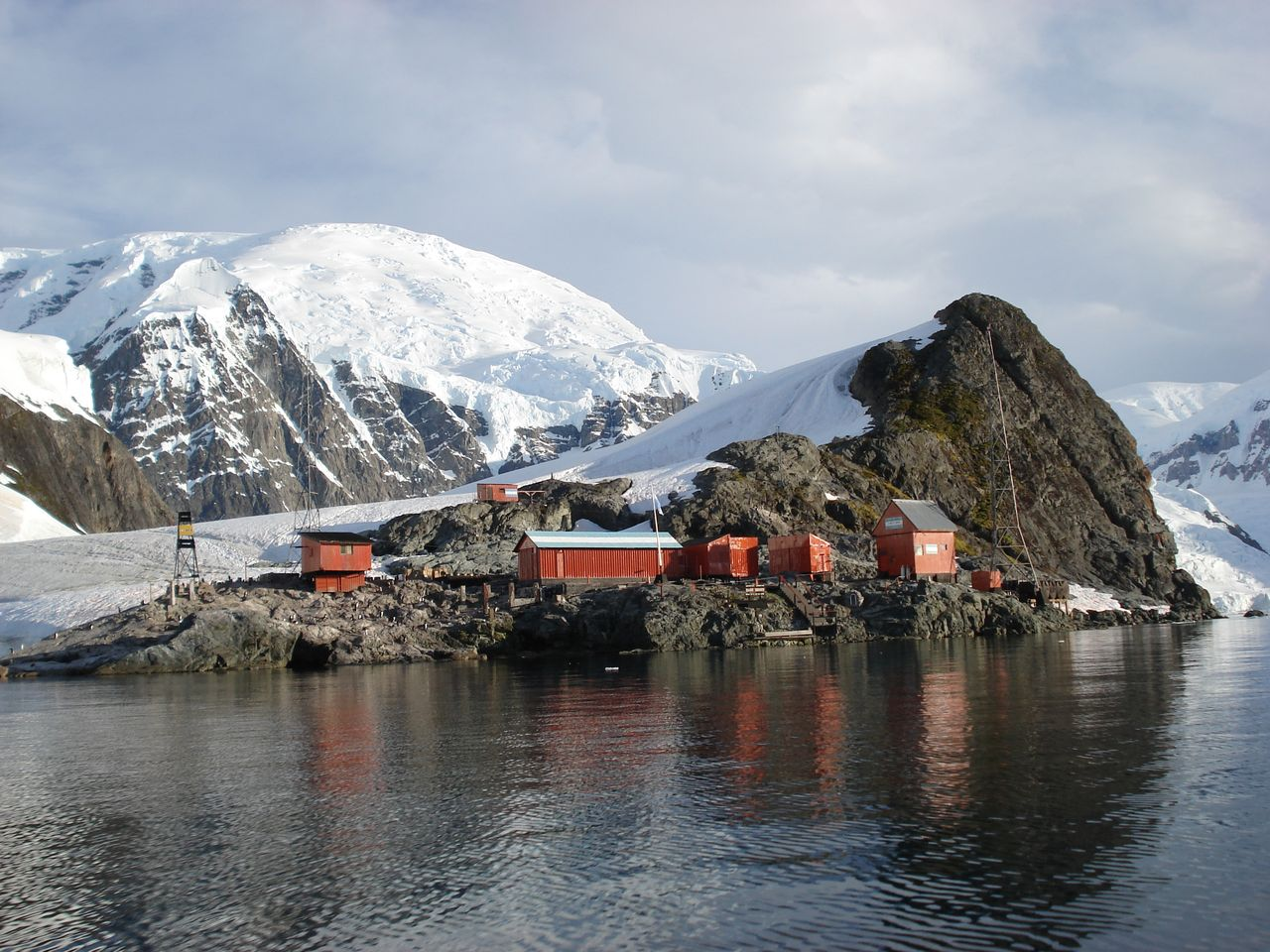
Overview from the harbor, 2009

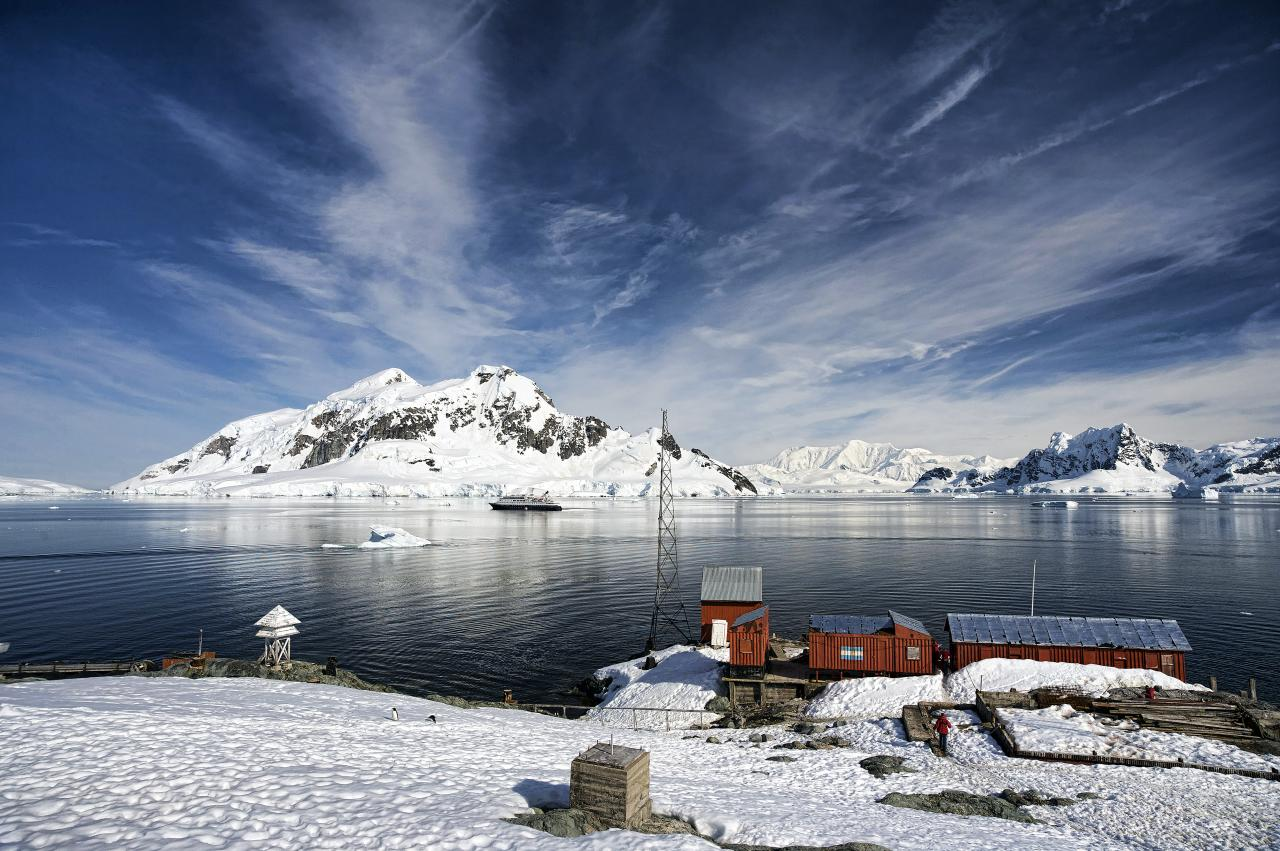
Paradise Harbor as seen from the base

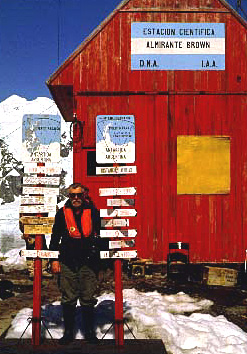
Brown in 1996

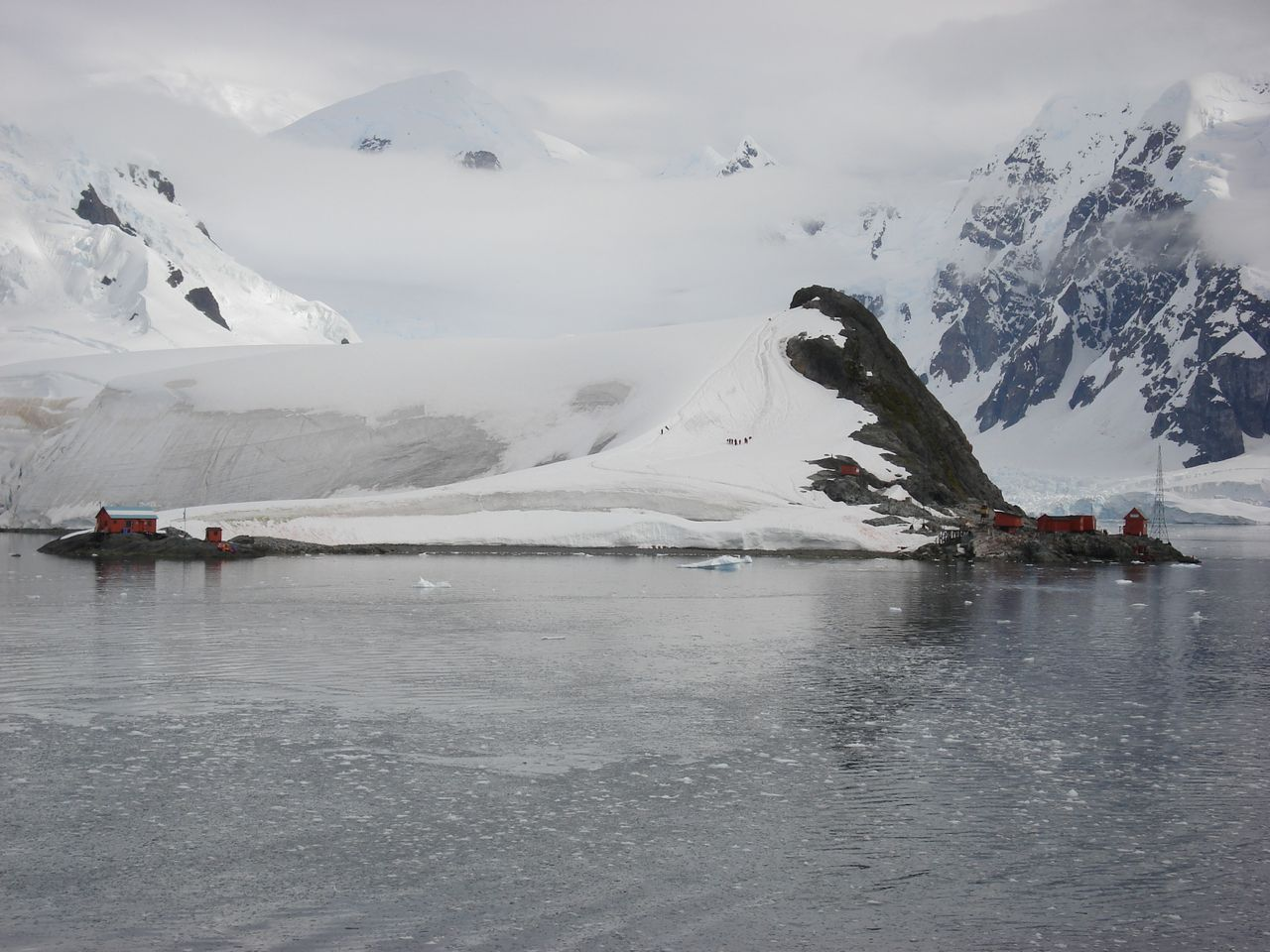
Overview of Brown and Conscripto Ortiz Refuge, local summer of 2009

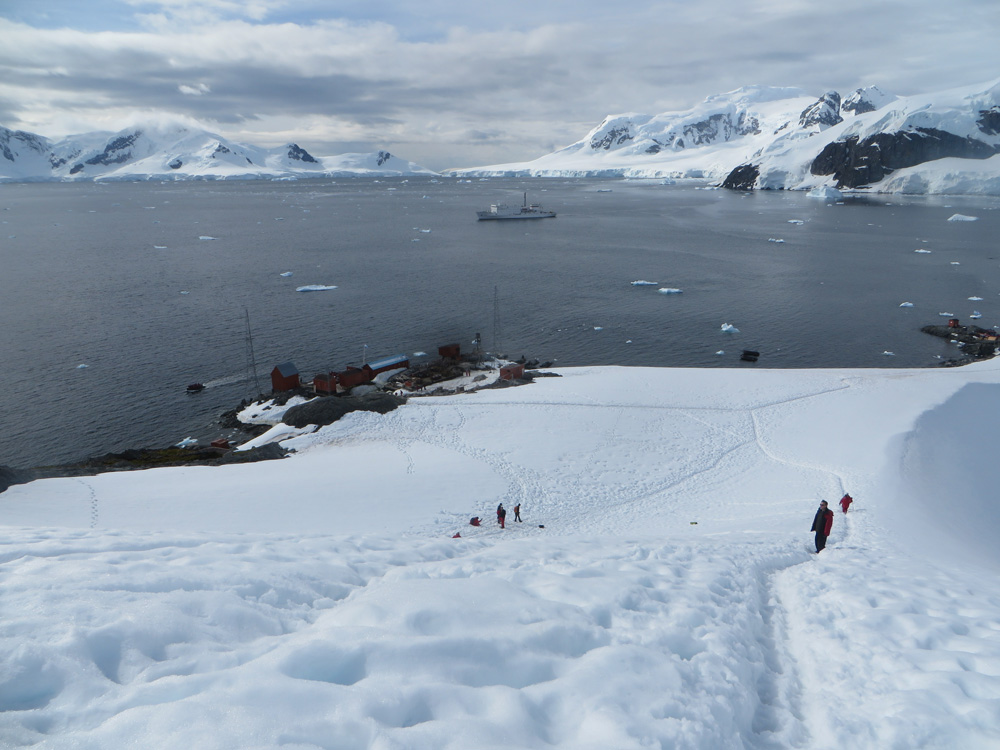
The base is set among the beauty of Paradise Harbor

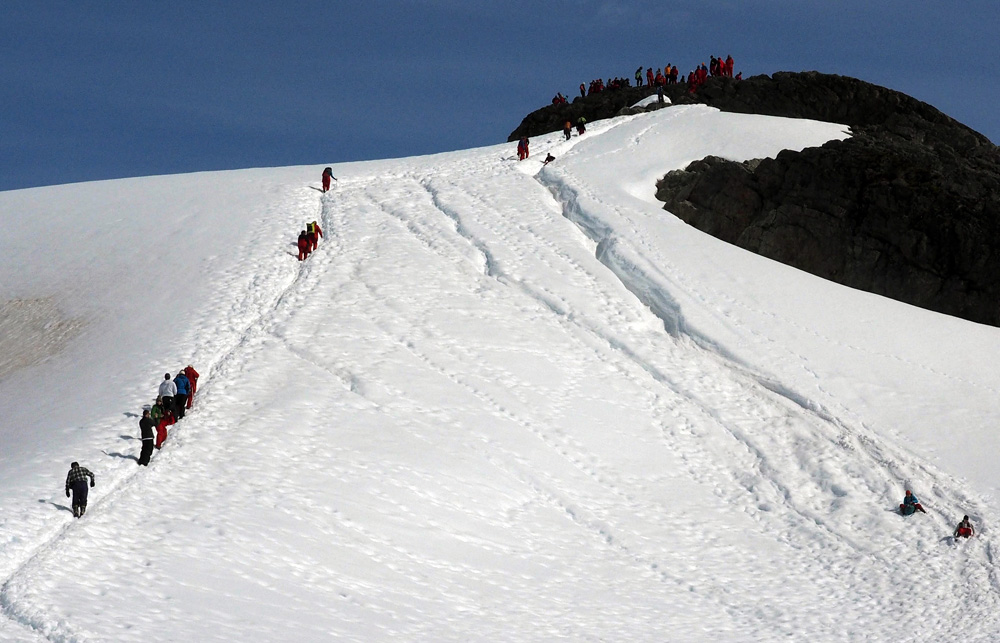
Tourists hiking up and sledding down the hill above the base
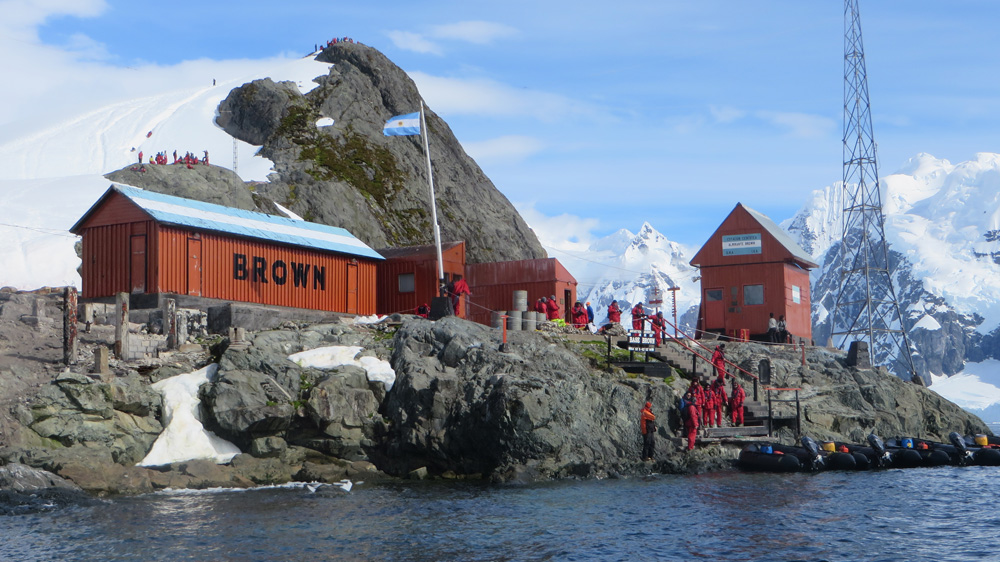
Tourists visiting Brown in austral summer, 2014

== Climate ==
Weather in the area is relatively mild, the nearby mountains shelter the bay from strong winds. The average annual temperature is 2 °C (36 °F) and the minimum historical record is −29 °C (−20 °F) on 9 August 1958.

== See also ==
- Almirante Ice Fringe
- Argentine Antarctica
- List of Antarctic research stations
- List of Antarctic field camps
