= Paradise Harbour =

Bay in Antarctica

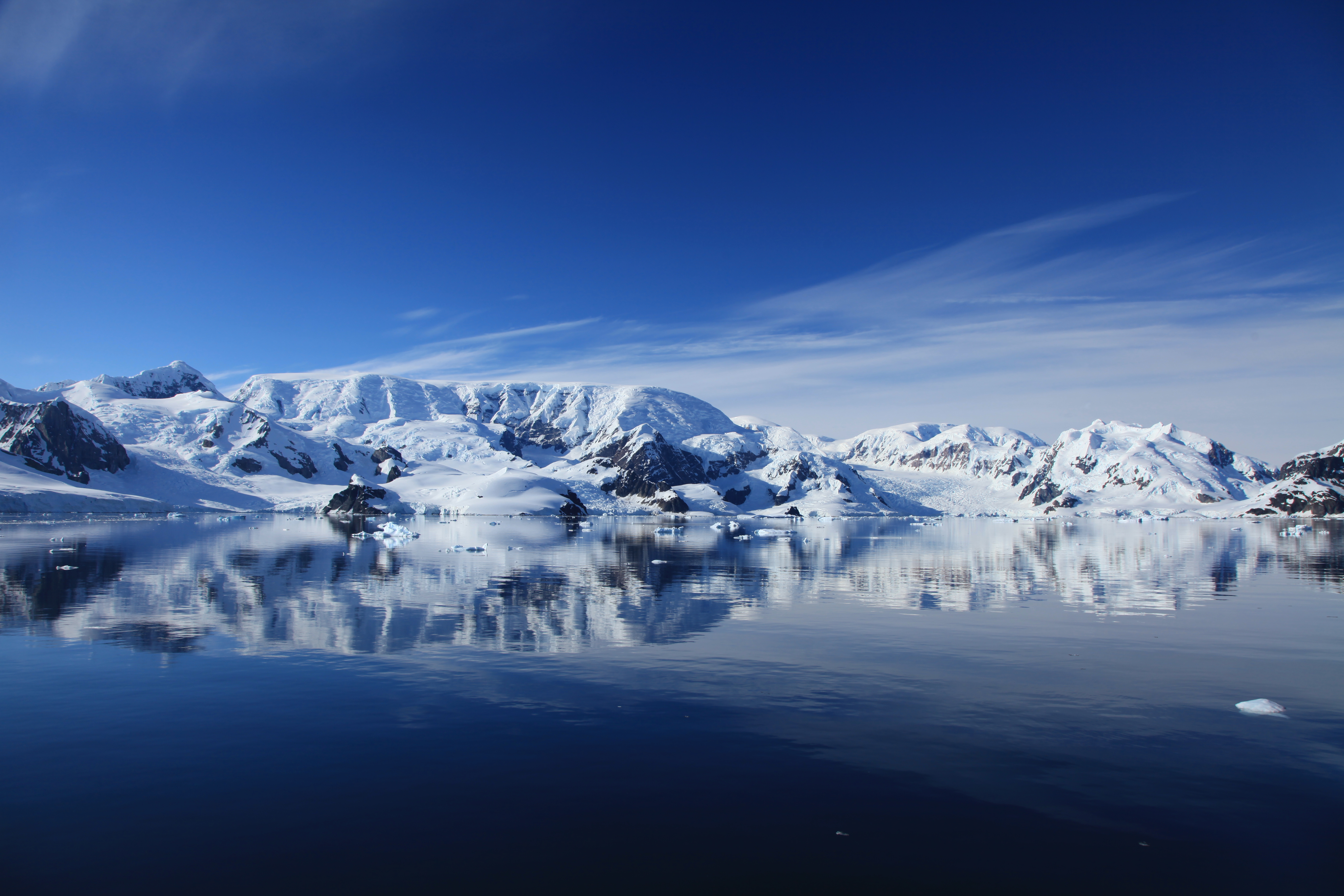
- Paradise Harbour in 2011

- Location in Antarctica
- Location: Antarctic Peninsula
- Coordinates: 64°49′S 62°52′W

Paradise Harbour (64°49′S 62°52′W) is a wide embayment behind Lemaire Island and Bryde Island, indenting the west coast of Graham Land, Antarctica, between Duthiers Point and Leniz Point. The name was first applied by whalers operating in the vicinity and was in use by 1920.

== Location ==
Danco Coast, Antarctic Peninsula. Paradise Harbour to the west

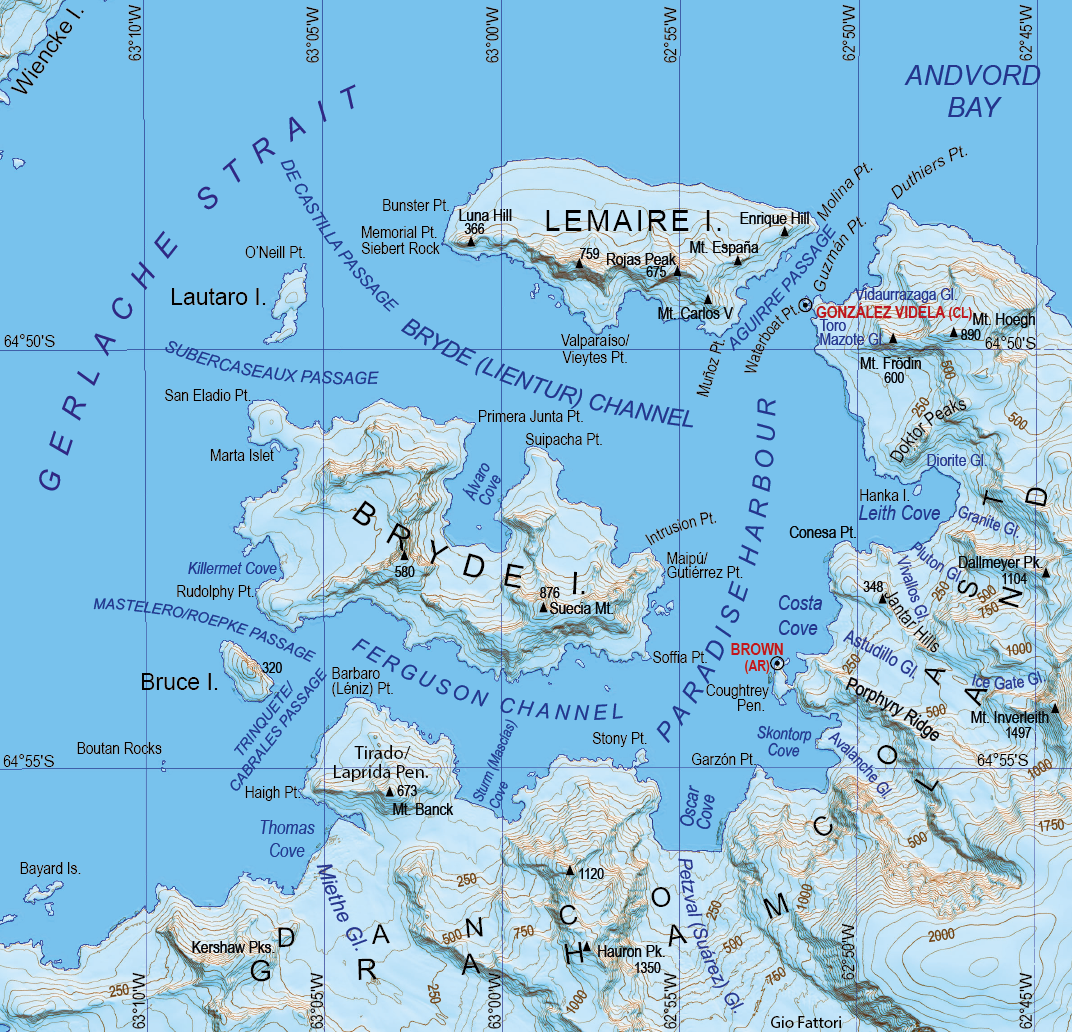
Map of Paradise Harbour.

Paradise Harbour is off the Danco Coast on the west side of the Antarctic Peninsula. The Brown Station (Argentina) and Gabriel González Videla Station (Chile) stations are on its eastern shore. Kershaw Peaks are to the south. Bryde Island and Lemaire Island are to the west. There is a passage from the southwestern end of the Gerlache Strait through Paradise Harbour and between Lemaire Island and the mainland into Andvord Bay to the northeast.

== Sailing Directions ==
The Sailing Directions for Antarctica (1976) describes Paradise Harbour as follows:

Paradise Harbor is a wide embayment in the coast southwestward of Andvord Bay, and lies southward of Lamaire and eastward of Bryde Island. Anchorage may be taken in 45 fathoms with clay bottom. It was reported (1960) that the bottom is rock and the holding ground is poor. The head of Paradise Harbor terminates in Skontorp and Oscar coves, both narrow circular inlets with steep glaciers on the shore, the arms of which show the granite structure. Deep water is found up to the cliff face of the glaciers. Frequent calving of the glacier may produce an uncomfortable swell and require vessels to move to avoid drift-ice. There is almost constant movement of ice betsween the mainland and the two islands, Lemaire and Bryde, changing direction with the two tides daily and attaining rates up to 3 knots. These conditions require a constant alert by vessels anchored here. The tidal current prevents the ice in the bay from freezing, even in the winter months.

== Historic site ==
In 1950, a shelter was erected near the Chilean Base to honour Gabriel González Videla, the first head of state to visit the Antarctic. The shelter constitutes a representative example of pre-International Geophysical Year (IGY) activity in Antarctica. It has been designated a Historic Site or Monument (HSM 30), following a proposal by Chile to the Antarctic Treaty Consultative Meeting.

== Glaciers ==
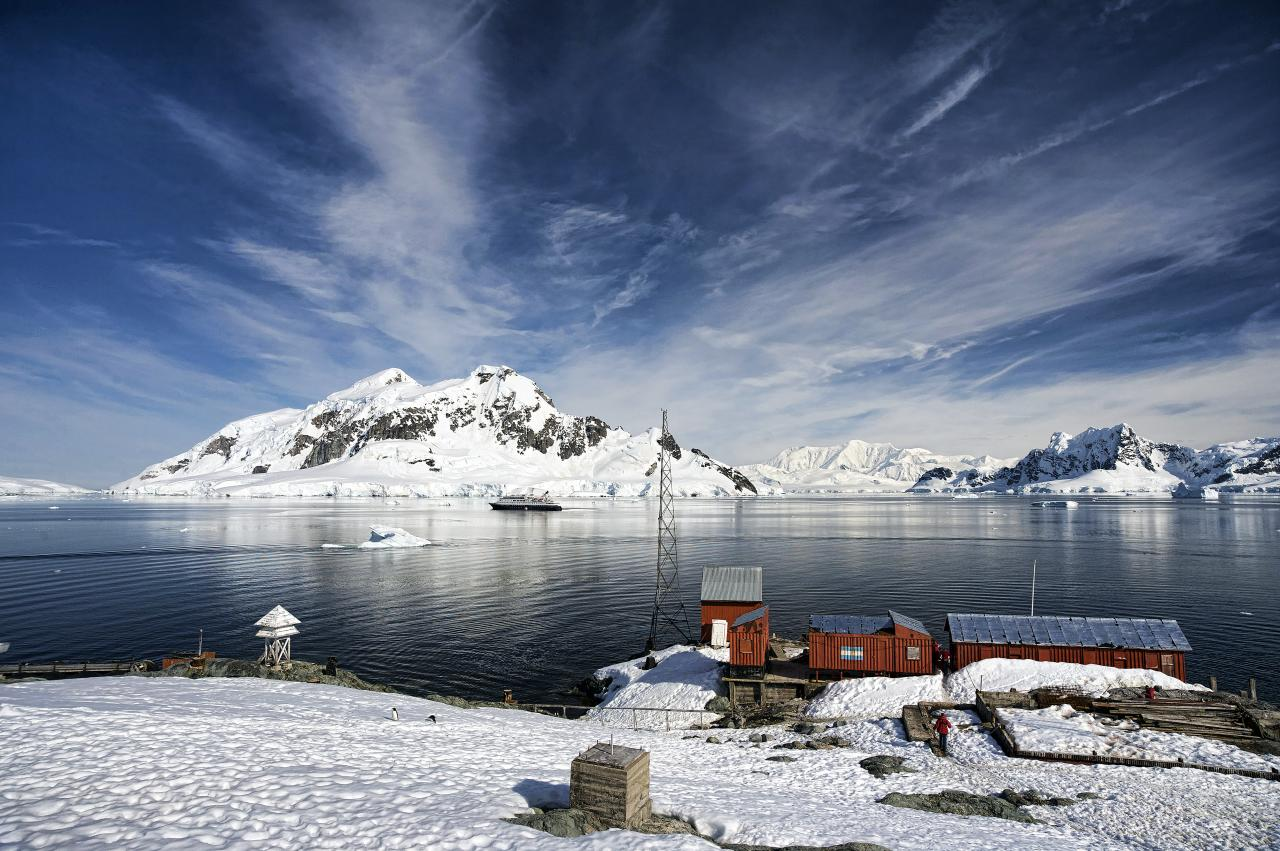
Brown Station (Argentina) in Paradise Harbour

=== Vivallos Glacier ===
64°52′S 62°48′W. A short, steep glacier flowing north into Leith Cove, Paradise Harbour. Following survey by the Chilean Antarctic Expedition, 1950-51, the glacier was named for Cabo Jose L. Vivallos, a member of the expedition.

=== Astudillo Glacier ===
64°53′S 62°51′W. A small glacier flowing into Paradise Harbour between Leith Cove and Skontorp Cove. The glacier was surveyed by the Chilean Antarctic Expedition (1950-51) which applied the name, probably after an expedition member.

=== Ice Gate Glacier ===
64°54′00.0″S 62°45′00.0″W. A narrow hanging glacier, tributary to Astudillo Glacier, between rock spurs on the west slope of Dallmeyer Peak. Named by the Polish Antarctic Expedition, about 1992, probably from the gatelike appearance of the spurs at the junction of the two glaciers.

=== Suárez Glacier ===
64°56′S 62°56′W. A glacier flowing into the small cove between Skontorp Cove and Sturm Cove. First mapped by Scottish geologist David Ferguson in 1913-14. Remapped by the 5th Chilean Antarctic Expedition (1950-51) and named for Lieutenant Commander Francisco Suárez V., Operations Officer on the transport ship Angamos.

== Eastern features ==
Coastal features of the east side of the harbour include, from north to south,

=== Waterboat Point ===
64°49′S 62°51′W. The low westernmost termination of the peninsula between Paradise Harbour and Andvord Bay on the west coast of Graham Land. This feature has "island" characteristics, but it is only separated from the mainland at high water and is more usefully described as a "point." The coast in this vicinity was first roughly surveyed by the Belgian Antarctic Expedition in 1898. This point was surveyed and given this name by T. W. Bagshawe and M. C. Lester who lived here in a water boat from January 1921 until January 1922.

=== Mount Frödin ===
64°50′S 62°50′W. A mountain, about 600 metres (2,000 feet) high, rising 0.5 nautical miles (0.93 kilometres; 0.58 miles) east-southeast of Waterboat Point. The feature was originally called "Mount Lunch-Ho!" by T. W. Bagshawe and M. C. Lester, because on the first ascent in 1921 lunch was eaten on the summit. Renamed by the Chilean Antarctic Expedition (1950-51) after Swedish engineer Bertil Frodin, who conducted geological and glaciological studies on the expedition.

=== Hanka Island ===
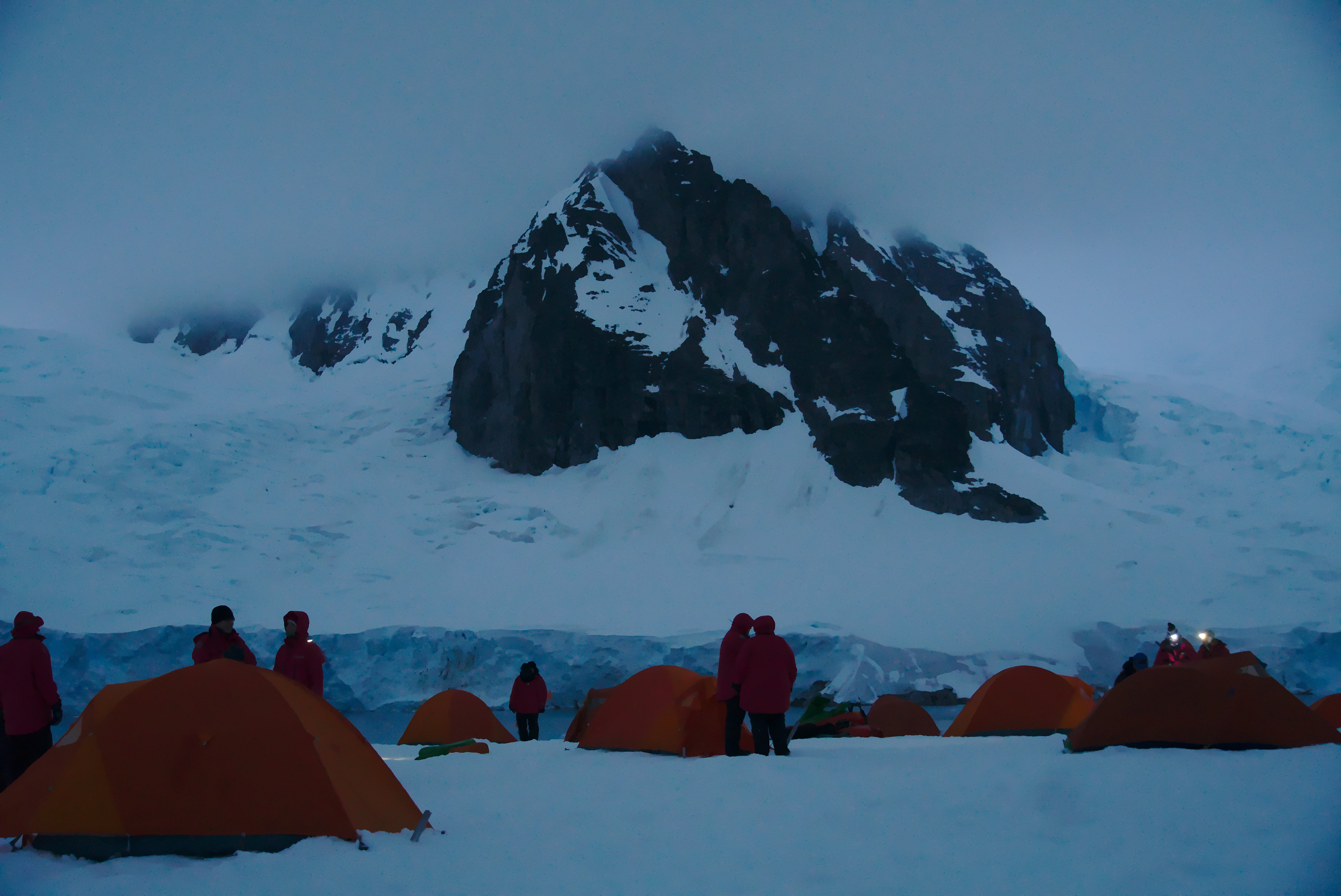
Camping at Hanka Island in February 2019

64°51′S 62°49′W. Small island lying near the head of Leith Cove, Paradise Harbour. The name was applied by Scottish geologist David Ferguson, who visited this area in the whaler Hanka in 1913-14.

=== Leith Cove ===
64°52′S 62°50′W. A cove in the northeast part of Paradise Harbour. Probably named by whalers operating in this vicinity. Leith, Scotland, is the home of Christian Salvesen & Co., a whaling firm which operated in Antarctic waters.

=== Coughtrey Peninsula ===
64°54′S 62°53′W. A small hook-shaped peninsula at the north side of the entrance to Skontorp Cove. First mapped as an island in 1913-14 by Scottish geologist David Ferguson, who named it Coughtrey Island. The feature is, however, a peninsula and the site of the Brown Station, established by Argentina in 1949-50.

=== Skontorp Cove ===
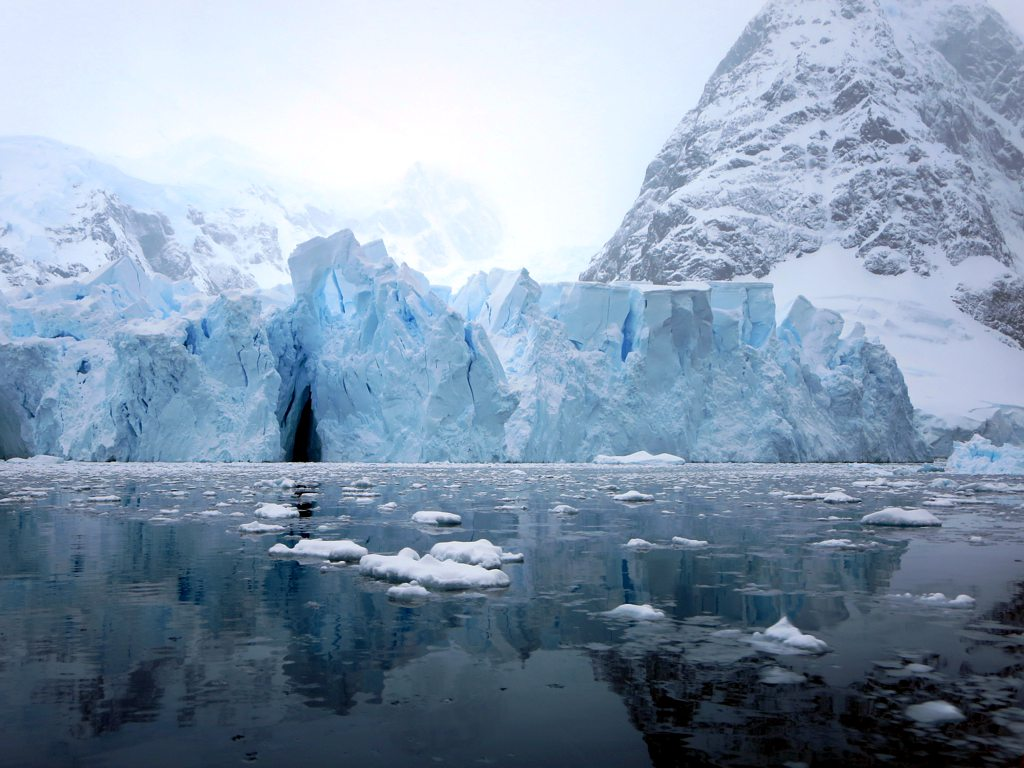
Suárez Glacier (also known as Petzval Glacier) in Skontorp Cove

64°54′S 62°52′W. A cove in Paradise Harbour, lying 2 nautical miles (3.7 kilometres; 2.3 miles) southeast of Bryde Island. Named for Edvard Skontorp, an outstanding Norwegian whale gunner, who commanded a whaler for Salvesen and Co. of Leith, Scotland.

== Southern features ==
Features of the southern coast of the harbour include, from east to west:

=== Garzón Point ===
64°55′S 62°53′W. A point between Oscar Cove and Skontorp Cove in southern Paradise Harbour. Following Argentine exploration in the area, named in 1956 by the Comisión de Coordinación Geográfica (Argentina) after General Eugenio Garzón, a hero of the Argentine War of Independence.

=== Oscar Cove ===
64°55′S 62°55′W. A cove next west of Garzón Point in southern Paradise Harbour. The cove was named "Caleta Oscar" by the Argentine Antarctic Expedition, 1949-50, from the first name of the second-in-command of the expedition ship Chiriguano used in survey of the area.

=== Hauron Peak ===
64°56′S 62°59′W. A peak, 1,350 metres (4,430 feet) high, rising 3 nautical miles (5.6 kilometres; 3.5 miles) southeast of Mount Banck. The peak appears on an Argentine government chart of 1952. Named by the UK-APC in 1960 for Louis Arthur Ducos du Hauron (1837-1920), French pioneer of cinematography, the first man to lay down the fundamental principles of color photography, in 1869.

=== Mascías Cove ===
64°54′S 63°01′W. A cove indenting the west coast of Graham Land immediately east of Mount Banck. First roughly charted by the Belgian Antarctic Expedition under Adrien de Gerlache, 1897-99, and later, by the Scottish geologist David Ferguson, 1913-14. Named for Lieutenant Eladio Mascias of the tug Chiriguano which made a survey of the area during the Argentine Antarctic Expedition of 1949-50.

=== Mount Banck ===
64°54′S 63°03′W. A conspicuous mountain of red rock, 675 metres (2,215 feet) high, dominating the small peninsula just west of Mascias Cove. In 1898 the Belgian Antarctic Expedition under Adrien de Gerlache applied the name "Ile Banck" to a feature which was charted as an island separated from the mainland by a narrow channel. Air photos show it is actually a small peninsula, on which the most prominent feature is this mountain. The name Mount William, given by Biscoe in 1832 to a mountain which he described as being on the mainland but now identified on Anvers Island, has been used for the feature here described.

=== Leniz Point ===
64°54′S 63°05′W. The north extremity of the small peninsula on which Mount Banck stands, lying 1 nautical mile (1.9 kilometres; 1.2 miles) south of Byrde Island. First charted by the Belgian Antarctic Expedition under Adrien de Gerlache, who made a landing here on February 10, 1898. The toponym appears on a Chilean government chart of 1951 and is for the chief stoker Clorindo Leniz Gallejo, on board the tender Yelcho which rescued the crew of the Endurance from Elephant Island in August 1916.

== Sources ==
- Alberts, Fred G., ed. (1995), Geographic Names of the Antarctic (PDF) (2 ed.), United States Board on Geographic Names This article incorporates public domain material from websites or documents of the United States Board on Geographic Names.
- Graham Land and South Shetland Islands, BAS: British Antarctic Survey, 2005
- "Ice Gate Glacier", Composite Gazetteer of Antarctica, Scientific Committee on Antarctic Research
- List of Historic Sites and Monuments approved by the ATCM (2012) (PDF), Antarctic Treaty Secretariat, 2012
- Sailing Directions for Antarctica: Includes Islands South of Latitude 60.̊, United States. Defense Mapping Agency. Hydrographic Center, 1976 This article incorporates public domain material from websites or documents of the National Geospatial-Intelligence Agency.
