= Helcogrammoides antarcticus =

Conservation status
- Data Deficient (IUCN 3.1)

Scientific classification
- Kingdom: Animalia
- Phylum: Chordata
- Class: Actinopterygii
- Order: Blenniiformes
- Family: Tripterygiidae
- Genus: Helcogrammoides
- Species: H. antarcticus

Binomial name
- Helcogrammoides antarcticus (Tomo, 1982)

Synonyms
- Tripterygium antarcticum Tomo, 1982

Species of fish

Helcogrammoides antarcticus is a species of triplefin blenny in the genus Helcogrammoides. It was described by Aedo Pascual Tomo in 1982. This species has only been recorded from Paradise Bay on the Antarctic Peninsula.
