= Bryde Island (Antarctica) =

Island in Palmer Archipelago, Antarctica

- Location within Antarctica

Geography
- Location: Gerlache Strait, Graham Land, Antarctica
- Coordinates: 64°52′S 63°2′W

Bryde Island (64°52′S 63°2′W) is an island 6 nautical miles (11 km; 6.9 mi) long and 3 nautical miles (5.6 km; 3.5 mi) wide, lying immediately southwest of Lemaire Island, off the west coast of Graham Land, Antarctica.

== Location ==
Danco Coast, Antarctic Peninsula. Bryde Island to the west

Bryde Island is off the Danco Coast on the west side of the Antarctic Peninsula. It is near the southern end of the Gerlache Strait, opposite Wiencke Island to the west. Lemaire Island is to the north, Paradise Harbour to the east and southeast, and Kershaw Peaks on the mainland to the south.

== Description ==
The Sailing Directions for Antarctica (1976) describes Bryde Island as follows:

Bryde Island, a high broken rock ridge with snow slopes descending to the shoreline, is about six miles long and three miles wide, and lies approximately 1 3/4 miles southwestward of Lemaire Island. Bryde Island rises to a height of 2,874 feet near its southeastern end. The rocks are brown, weather-worn diorites with some disrupted sediments. Anchorage can be taken off the eastern end of the island in depths of 22 to 50 fathoms. On one chart a dangerous rock lies about 2/3 mile west-southwestward of the southeastern extremity of Bryde Island; an 8-fathom patch lies about 1/4 mile southwestward of the rock above.

The northern shore is indented by a cove about 1 mile long, in a north-south direction, and 3/4 mile wide. Three small islets lie close along the eastern side of the island; a hut is located on the southernmost islet. One chart shows a beacon standing on the northernmost islet of four islets lying close along the eastern side of the island. A light my be exhibited from the beacon, but it is unreliable, and it is obscured from the south by the high land on the islet. Two small coves indent the western side of Bryde Island. Two conspicuous rocks and a sunken rock, with less than 6 feet of water over it, lie in the northern cove; an isolated rock lies just outside of the entrance to the southern cove.

== Discovery and name ==
Bryde Island was discovered by the Belgian Antarctic Expedition (BelgAE) under Adrien de Gerlache, 1897–99, and named for Ingvald Bryde, Norwegian agent who arranged the purchase of the expedition ship Belgica.

== Features ==
=== San Eladio Point ===
64°50′S 63°07′W. The northwest point of Bryde Island. Charted by the Argentine Antarctic Expedition, 1949-50, and named "Punta San Eladio" or "Cabo San Eladio" after a staff officer on the expedition ship Chiriguano. An English form of the name has been approved.

=== Alvaro Cove ===
64°51′S 63°01′W. A cove on the north side of Bryde Island. The feature was surveyed by the Argentine Antarctic Expedition, 1950-51, and named after a staff officer with the relief ship of the expedition.

=== Killermet Cove ===
64°52′S 63°07′W. The southernmost of two coves indenting the west side of Bryde Island, off the west coast of Graham Land. The cove appears on an Argentine government chart of 1950. So named by the UK Antarctic Place-Names Committee (UK-APC) in 1960 because three members of the Falkland Islands Dependencies Survey (FIDS) were chased into this cove in their dinghies by six killer whales while circumnavigating Bryde Island in May 1957.

=== Rudolphy Point ===
64°53′S 63°07′W. The southwest point of Bryde Island. Named "Punta Rudolphy" by the Chilean Antarctic Expedition, 1950-51, after Captain Raul Rudolphy of the Chilean Navy, commander of the expedition transport ship Angamos.

== Nearby features ==
=== Argentino Channel ===
64°54′S 63°01′W. Channel between Bryde Island and the west coast of Graham Land, connecting Paradise Harbor with Gerlache Strait. First roughly charted by the BelgAE, 1897-99. The name "Canal Argentino" appears for the feature on an Argentine government chart of 1950.

=== Bruce Island ===
64°54′S 63°08′W. An island lying 0.5 nautical miles (0.93 km; 0.58 mi) off the southwest corner of Bryde Island in Gerlache Strait. Discovered and mapped by the BelgAE, 1897-99, under Lieutenant Adrien de Gerlache. The name was first used by Scottish geologist David Ferguson, who made a geological reconnaissance in this vicinity from the whalecatcher Hanka in 1913.

=== Boutan Rocks ===
64°54′S 63°10′W. Small group of rocks lying 1.5 nautical miles (2.8 km; 1.7 mi) southwest of Bruce Island. The rocks appear on an Argentine government chart of 1954. Named by the UK-APC in 1960 for Louis Boutan (1859-1934), French naturalist and pioneer of submarine photography, 1893-98.

== Sources ==
- Alberts, Fred G., ed. (1995), Geographic Names of the Antarctic (PDF) (2 ed.), United States Board on Geographic Names This article incorporates public domain material from websites or documents of the United States Board on Geographic Names.
- Graham Land and South Shetland Islands, BAS: British Antarctic Survey, 2005
- Sailing Directions for Antarctica: Includes Islands South of Latitude 60.̊, United States. Defense Mapping Agency. Hydrographic Center, 1976
