= Waterboat Point =

Headland in Antarctica

Coordinates: 64°49′S 62°51′W

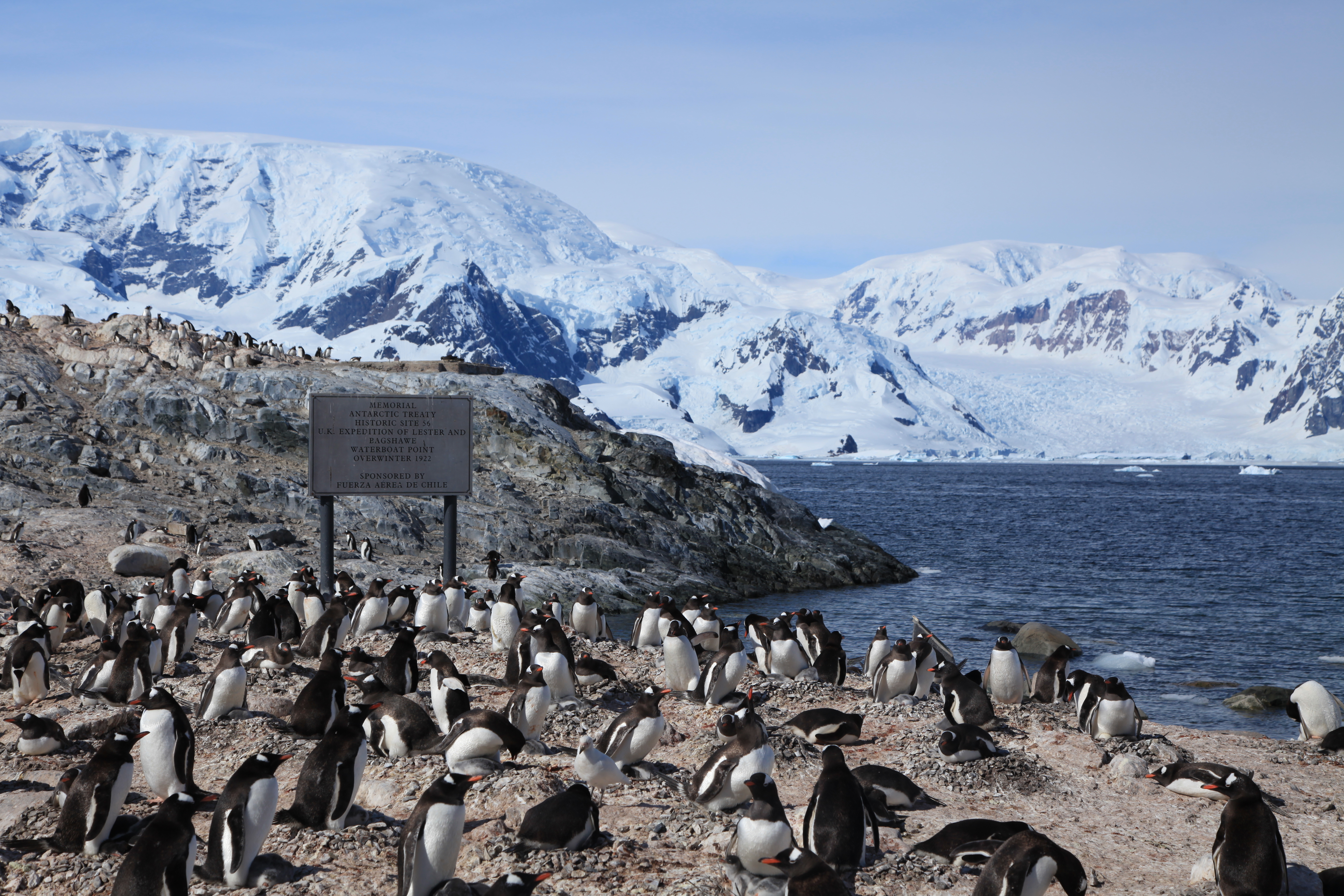
Gentoo penguins nest around this historic site where two British researchers spent a year in 1921-1922

Waterboat Point (Spanish: Península Munita) is the low westernmost termination of the peninsula between Paradise Harbor and Andvord Bay on the west coast of Graham Land. This feature has "island" characteristics, but it is only separated from the mainland at high water and is more usefully described as a "point". Chile's González Videla Antarctic Base is located at Waterboat Point.

Named "Península Munita" by Chile, after Rear Admiral Diego Munita Whittaker, Commodore in the V Chilean Antarctic Campaign, 1951, under whose command González Videla Base was built.

== Historic site ==
The coast in this vicinity was first roughly surveyed by the Belgian Antarctic Expedition in 1898. The point was surveyed and given its name by Thomas W. Bagshawe and Maxime C. Lester who lived here, in a hut improvised from a water boat, from January 1921 until January 1922. Although only the base of the boat, foundations of doorposts and an outline of the hut and extension still exist, the remains and immediate environs have been designated a Historic Site or Monument (HSM 56), following a proposal by Chile and the United Kingdom to the Antarctic Treaty Consultative Meeting.
