= FjordEco Project =

Modeling study supported by the U.S. government

The FjordEco Project, formally titled Fjord Ecosystem Structure and Function on the West Antarctica Peninsula – Hotspots of Productivity and Biodiversity?(FjordEco), is an integrated field and modeling study supported by the United States National Science Foundation. The study conducted research cruises to Andvord Bay in Nov-Dec 2015, April 2016, and Mar-Apr 2017 to evaluate physical oceanographic processes, glacial inputs, plankton dynamics, and benthic community structure and function in the bay.

== Publication ==
Scientific publications from the project include the following:

- Christensen, K., 2017. The Upper Layer Structure and Variability of an Antarctic Glacio-marine Fjord: Andvord Bay, Western Antarctic Peninsula.
- Cusick, A.M., Gilmore, R., Bombosch, A., Mascioni, M., Almandoz, G.O. and Vernet, M., 2020. Polar tourism as an effective research tool. Oceanography, 33(1), pp. 50–61.
- Eidam, E.F., Nittrouer, C.A., Lundesgaard, Ø., Homolka, K.K. and Smith, C.R., 2019. Variability of sediment accumulation rates in an Antarctic fjord. Geophysical Research Letters, 46(22), pp. 13271–13280.
- Ekern, L., 2017. Assessing seasonal primary production in Andvord Bay, Antarctica (Master thesis, UC San Diego).
- Forsch, K., Hahn-Woernle, L., Sherrell, R., Roccanova, J., Bu, K., Burdige, D., Vernet, M. and Barbeau, K.A., 2021. Seasonal dispersal of fjord meltwaters as an important source of iron to coastal Antarctic phytoplankton. Biogeosciences Discussions, pp. 1–49.
- Hahn-Woernle, L., Powell, B., Lundesgaard, Ø. and van Wessem, M., 2020. Sensitivity of the summer upper ocean heat content in a Western Antarctic Peninsula fjord. Progress in Oceanography, 183, p. 102287.
- Hamilton, M., 2021. The Molecular Diversity and Physiology of Polar Phytoplankton (Doctoral dissertation, University of California, Santa Cruz).
- Lewis, M., 2018. Assessing the down-fjord mechanistic relationships of biodiversity and abundance of Antarctic benthic macrofauna of Andvord Bay (Senior Thesis, University of Hawaiʻi at Mānoa).
- Lundesgaard, Ø., 2018. Physical processes in a Western Antarctic Peninsula fjord (Doctoral dissertation, University of Hawai'i at Manoa).
- Lundesgaard, O., Powell, B., Merrifield, M., Hahn-Woernle, L. and Winsor, P. 2019, Response of an Antarctic Peninsula Fjord to Summer Katabatic Wind Events, J. Phys. Oceanogr., 49, 1485–1502, https://doi.org/10.1175/JPO-D-18-0119.1
- Lundesgaard, O., Winsor, P., Truffer, M., Merrifield, M., Powell, B., Statscewich, H., Eidam, E., and Smith, C.R., 2020. Hydrography and energetics of a cold fjord: Andvord Bay, western Antarctic Peninsula. Progress in Oceanography, https://doi.org/10.1016/j.pocean.2019.102224.
- Mascioni, M., Almandoz, G.O., Ekern, L., Pan, B.J. and Vernet, M., 2021. Microplanktonic diatom assemblages dominated the primary production but not the biomass in an Antarctic fjord. Journal of Marine Systems, 224, p. 103624.
- Pan, B.J., 2020. The Impact of Seasonal Environmental Variables on Phytoplankton Ecology at the Antarctic Ice-Ocean Boundary: Studies Through Field Work, Numerical Models, Data Science, and Machine Learning. University of California, San Diego.
- Pan, B.J., Vernet, M., Manck, L., Forsch, K., Ekern, L., Mascioni, M., Barbeau, K, Almandoz, G., and Orona, A.J., 2020, Environmental Drivers of Phytoplankton Taxonomic Composition in an Antarctic Fjord, Progress in Oceanography, 183, 102295, https://doi.org/10.1016/j.pocean.2020.102295
- Pan, B.J., Vernet, M., Reynolds, R.A., and Mitchell, B.G., 2020, The optical and biological properties of glacial meltwater in an Antarctic fjord, PLoS ONE, 14, 2, https://doi.org/10.1371/journal.pone.0211107
- Smith Craig, R., Vernet, M., Winsor, P., Lundesgaard, O., Powell, B., Truffer, M., Merrifield, M., Sweetman, A., Nunnally, C., Ziegler, A. and Lewis, M., 2017, July. Multi-disciplinary studies of Andvord Bay indicate katabatic wind forcing, pulses of export flux, and high food availability and benthic abundance in inner fjord basins. In Book of Abstracts (p. 429).
- Ziegler, A., 2019. Environmental Drivers of Benthic Community Structure and Function in Fjords of the West Antarctic Peninsula. PhD Dissertation, University of Hawaiʻi at Mānoa.
- Ziegler, A.F., Cape, M., Lundesgaard, Ø. and Smith, C.R., 2020. Intense deposition and rapid processing of seafloor phytodetritus in a glaciomarine fjord, Andvord Bay (Antarctica). Progress in Oceanography, 187, p. 102413.
- Ziegler, A.F., Hahn-Woernle, L., Powell, B., and Smith, C. R., 2020. Larval dispersal modeling suggests limited ecological connectivity between fjords on the West Antarctic Peninsula. Integrative and Comparative Biology, icaa094, https://doi.org/10.1093/icb/icaa094
- Ziegler, A.F., Smith, C.R., Edwards, K.F. and Vernet, M., 2017. Glacial dropstones: islands enhancing seafloor species richness of benthic megafauna in West Antarctic Peninsula fjords. Marine Ecology Progress Series, 583, pp. 1–14.

== Sources ==
- Collaborative Research: Fjord Ecosystem Structure and Function on the West Antarctic Peninsula - Hotspots of Productivity and Biodiversity? (FjordEco), U.S. Antarctic Program Data Center
- "Fjord Ecosystem Structure and Function on the West Antarctic Peninsula – Hotspots of Productivity and Biodiversity (FjordEco)", Vernet Lab Projects, 25 June 2019
