= Lemaire Island =

Island in Palmer Archipelago, Antarctica

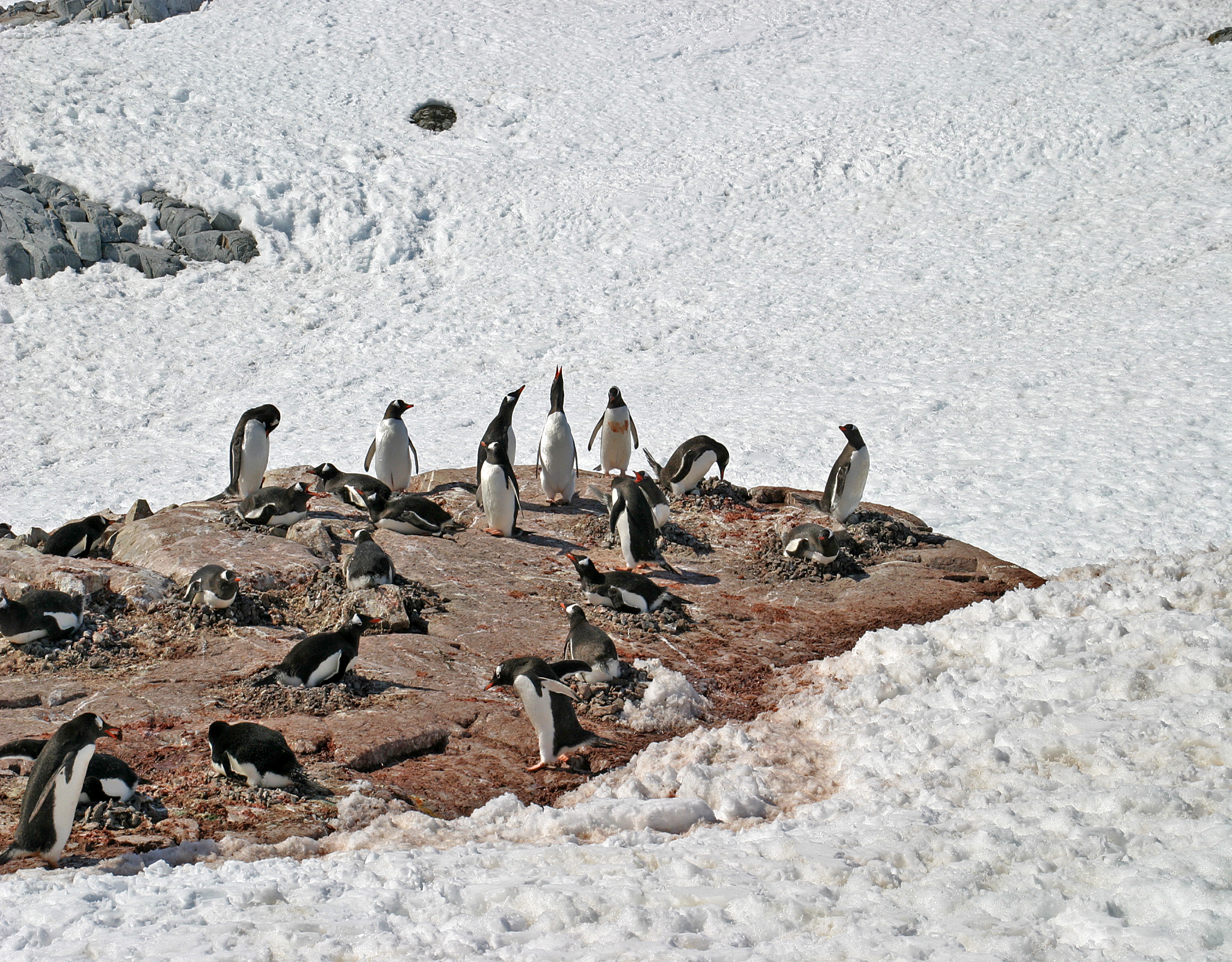
- Colony of gentoo penguins while breeding in their stone nests on Lemaire Island December 2005

- Location within Antarctica

Geography
- Location: Gerlache Strait, Graham Land, Antarctica
- Coordinates: 64°49′S 62°57′W

Lemaire Island (64°49′S 62°57′W) is an island 4.5 nautical miles (8.3 km; 5.2 mi) long and 1.5 nautical miles (2.8 km; 1.7 mi) wide, lying 1 nautical mile (1.9 km; 1.2 mi) west of Duthiers Point off the west coast of Graham Land, Antarctica.

== Location ==
Danco Coast, Antarctic Peninsula. Lemaire Island to the west

Lemaire Island is off the Danco Coast on the west side of the Antarctic Peninsula. It is near the southern end of the Gerlache Strait, opposite Wiencke Island to the west. It is west of Rongé Island and Andvord Bay, and north of Bryde Island and Paradise Harbour.

Cruise ships that have sailed along the Neumayer Channel to Port Lockroy often pass by Lemaire Island when taking a different route to return.

== Description ==
The Sailing Directions for Antarctica (1976) describes Lemaire Island as follows:

Lemaire Island, at least 2,490 feet high, lies about 3/4 mile westward of Duthiers Head, the western promontory of Andvord Bay. This island is about 4 1/2 miles long east and west, and about 1 1/2 miles wide, and is completely covered by an ice cap which reaches to the sea in vertical ice cliffs fronted by several rocky islets. According to a 1963 survey, a BEACON stands near the eastern extremity of Lemaire Island. Bare outcrops show through the ice cap only where the rock surfaces are perpendicular. These are brown, weathered dioritic rocks with disrupted sediments. Foul ground borders the western shore for a distance of about 1/2 mile, and grounded icebergs near the northeastern extremity indicate shoaling near that point. One chart shows four small islets or rocks lying in a semicircle close off the same extremity.

== Discovery and name ==
Lemaire Island was discovered by the Belgian Antarctic Expedition (BelgAE), 1897–99, under Adrien de Gerlache, who named it for Charles Antoine Lemaire.

== Features ==
=== Memorial Point ===
64°48′45″S 63°01′40″W. On 3 October 2017, the UK Antarctic Place-Names Committee (UK-APC) approved the name "Memorial Point" for the western tip of Lemaire Island. It commemorates all British personnel who died while working in Antarctica, and who have not had features named after them as individuals.

=== Rojas Peak ===
64°49′S 62°55′W. A peak rising to about 675 metres (2,215 ft) high in the center of Lemaire Island. Named "Cerro Rojas" by the Chilean Antarctic Expedition, 1950-51, after Sargento Angel Gustavo Rojas, who disappeared in a blizzard while returning from hydrographic work at Discovery Bay, Greenwich Island, September 1, 1949.

=== Muñoz Point ===
64°50′S 62°54′W. The southeast point of Lemaire Island. First mapped by the BelgAE, 1897-99. Named "Punta Munoz" by the Chilean Antarctic Expedition, 1950-51, after Roberto Labra Muñoz, in charge of General Bernardo O'Higgins Station, 1950-51.

=== Molina Point ===
64°48′S 62°51′W. The eastern point of Lemaire Island. Named "Punta Molina" by the Chilean Antarctic Expedition, 1950-51, possibly after a member of the expedition.

== Nearby features ==
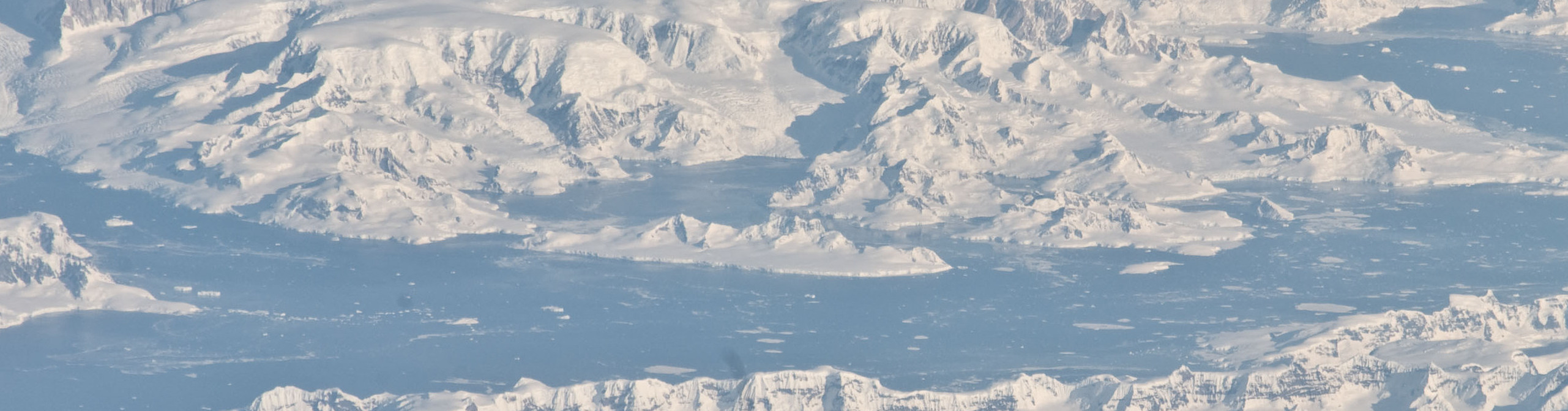
Gerlache Strait, Lemaire Island, Lientur Channel and Bryde Island

=== Lautaro Island ===
64°49′S 63°06′W. An island 1 nautical mile (1.9 km; 1.2 mi) long, lying just west of Lemaire Island in Gerlache Strait. Probably first seen by the BelgAE (1897-99) under Adrien de Gerlache. Named by the Chilean Antarctic Expedition (1948-49) after the Lautaro, one of the Chilean expedition ships working in the area that season.

=== O'Neill Point ===
64°49′S 63°06′W. The north point of Lautaro Island, lying 1.5 nautical miles (2.8 km; 1.7 mi) west-southwest of Lemaire Island. Named by the UK Antarctic Place-Names Committee (UK-APC) in 1977 for Vincent Michael O'Neill, FIDS radio operator and mechanic at Danco Island, 1957-58, and Deception Island, 1958-59.

=== Siebert Rock ===
64°49′S 63°02′W. A rock off the southwest point of Lemaire Island in the entrance to Lientur Channel. Charted by the Chilean Antarctic Expedition, 1950-51, and named after Capitán de Corbeta Ernesto Siebert G., engineer officer on the expedition transport ship Angamos.

=== Lientur Channel ===
64°50′S 63°00′W. Channel between Lemaire Island and Bryde Island connecting Paradise Harbor with Gerlache Strait. First roughly charted by the BelgAE, 1897-99. Named by the fourth Chilean Antarctic Expedition (1949-50) after the Lientur, one of the ships used during this expedition.

=== Aguirre Cerda Passage ===
64°49′S 62°51′W. A marine channel between Lemaire Island and Danco Coast, permitting northern access to Paradise Harbor. The feature was navigated by the ship Belgica (BelgAE, 1897-99) and was known to Norwegian whalers in the area from 1913. Chilean Antarctic Expeditions operated a science station on Waterboat Point at Aguirre Passage from 1951-73. Named by the Chilean Antarctic Expedition, 1950-51, after Don Pedro Aguirre Cerda (1879-1941), President of Chile, 1938-41.

== Sources ==
- Alberts, Fred G., ed. (1995), Geographic Names of the Antarctic (PDF) (2 ed.), United States Board on Geographic Names This article incorporates public domain material from websites or documents of the United States Board on Geographic Names.
- Graham Land and South Shetland Islands, BAS: British Antarctic Survey, 2005
- Memorial Point, Lemaire Island, British Antarctic Monument Trust, 3 December 2017
- Sailing Directions for Antarctica: Includes Islands South of Latitude 60.̊, United States. Defense Mapping Agency. Hydrographic Center, 1976
