= Helcogrammoides =

Scientific classification
- Kingdom: Animalia
- Phylum: Chordata
- Class: Actinopterygii
- Order: Blenniiformes
- Family: Tripterygiidae
- Subfamily: Tripterygiinae
- Genus: Helcogrammoides; Rosenblatt in Gon in Gon & Heemstra, 1990

Type species
- Tripterygium cunninghami Smitt, 1898

Species
- See text.

Genus of fishes

Helcogrammoides is a genus of triplefins in the family Tripterygiidae. The species in this genus are found in South America and the Antarctic Peninsula.

== Species ==
- Helcogrammoides antarcticus (Tomo, 1981)
- Helcogrammoides chilensis (Cancino, 1960)
- Cunningham's triplefin, Helcogrammoides cunninghami (Smitt, 1898)
