= Andvord Bay =

Bay in Antarctica

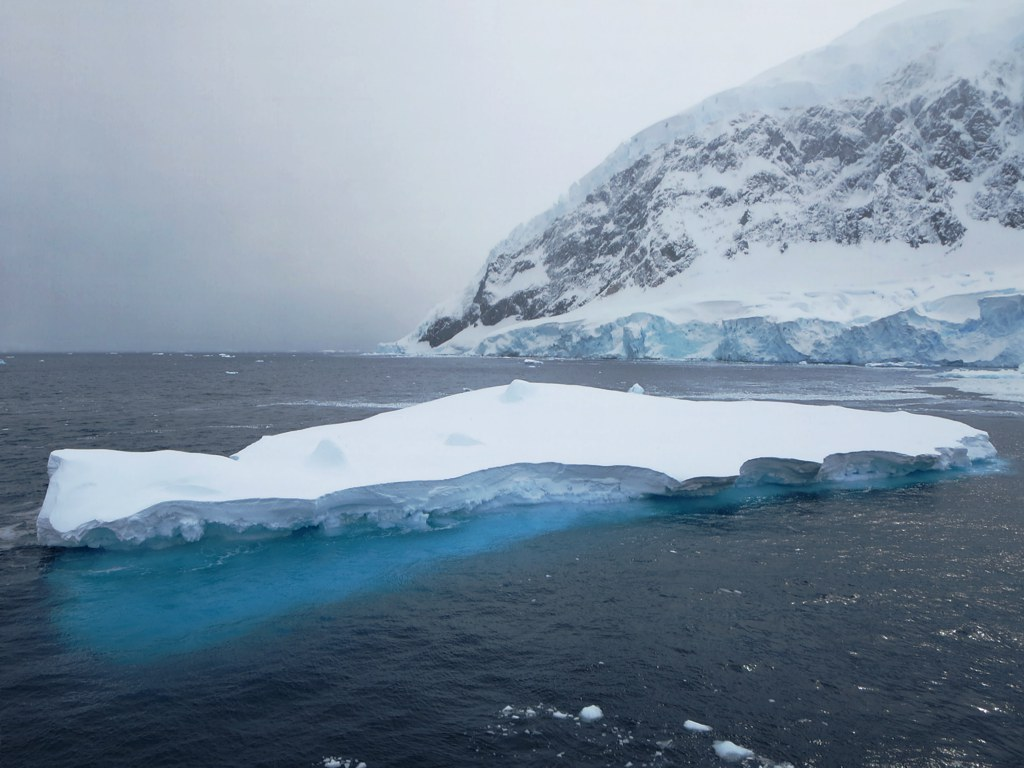
- A small iceberg floats in the clear cold waters of Andvord Bay with the Antarctic Peninsula beyond.

- Location within Antarctica
- Coordinates: 64°50′S 62°39′W

Andvord Bay (64°50′S 62°39′W) is a bay, 9 nautical miles (17 km; 10 mi) long and 3 nautical miles (5.6 km; 3.5 mi) wide, which lies between Beneden Head and Duthiers Point along the west coast of Graham Land, Antarctica.

== Location ==
Danco Coast, Antarctic Peninsula. Andvord Bay to the west

Andvord Bay is on the Danco Coast on the west side of the Antarctic Peninsula. It extends in a northwest direction from Forbidden Plateau. Laussedat Heights on the Arctowski Peninsula and Rongé Island are to the east of the bay, which opens onto the Gerlache Strait opposite Anvers Island. Lemaire Island and Paradise Harbour are to the southwest. Glaciers entering the bay, clockwise from the northeast, include Deville Glacier, Fliess Glacier (which enters Neko Harbour), Arago Glacier, Moser Glacier, Rudolph Glacier, Bagshawe Glacier and Grubb Glacier. Coastal features, clockwise from the northeast, include Beneden Head, Neko Harbour, Henryk Cove, Forbes Point, Lester Cove, Dallmeyer Peak, Almirante Ice Fringe, Steinheil Point, Mount Hoegh and Duthiers Point.

== Hydrography ==
Andvord Bay is a glacial fjord. The mouth of Andvord Bay is just to the north of an aquatic sill that restricts movement of relatively warm upper layer of circumpolar deep water from the Gerlache Strait into the fjord. The fjord therefore has cold deep water compared to bays further south, and its glaciers mainly lose ice through calving rather than glacial retreat driven by ocean water. Relatively little meltwater enters the bay, although some freshening can be detected near the surface in the summer. The lack of strong wind combined with the surface freshing cause stratification of salinity to a significant depth in the photic zone. This is hospitable to phytoplankton blooms.

== Discovery and name ==
Andvord Bay was discovered by the Belgian Antarctic Expedition (BelgAE), 1897–99, under Adrien de Gerlache, and named by him for Rolf Andvord, Belgian consul at Christiania (Oslo) at that time.

== FjordEco Project ==
The FjordEco Project is an integrated field and modeling study supported by the United States National Science Foundation. The study conducted research cruises to Andvord Bay in November-December 2015, April 2016, and March-April 2017 to evaluate physical oceanographic processes, glacial inputs, plankton dynamics, and benthic community structure and function in the bay.

== Glaciers ==
=== Arago Glacier ===
64°51′S 62°23′W. Glacier flowing into Andvord Bay just northwest of Moser Glacier. Mapped by the Falkland Islands Dependencies Survey (FIDS) from air photos taken by Hunting Aerosurveys Ltd. in 1956-57. Named by the UK Antarctic Place-Names Committee (UK-APC) in 1960 for François Arago (1786-1853), French geodesist who first demonstrated the application of photography to mapmaking in 1839.

=== Moser Glacier ===
64°51′S 62°22′W. Glacier flowing into Andvord Bay just southeast of Arago Glacier. Charted by the BelgAE under Gerlache, 1897-99. Named by the UK-APC in 1960 for Ludwig F. Moser (1805-80), German physicist who invented stereoscopic photography in 1844.

=== Blue Icefalls ===
64°54′00″S 62°20′00″W. Steep icefalls of blue ice on the west margin of Forbidden Plateau. The 4 nautical miles (7.4 km; 4.6 mi) long icefalls overlook the east-most cove of Andvord Bay. Named by the Polish Antarctic Expedition, about 1995.

=== Rudolph Glacier ===
64°54′S 62°26′W. Glacier flowing into Andvord Bay south of Moser Glacier. Charted by the BelgAE under Gerlache, 1897-99. Named by the UK-APC in 1960 for Paul Rudolph, German mathematical optician who designed the first anastigmat camera lens, introduced by Carl Zeiss AG in 1889, and the "Tessar" lens, introduced by Zeiss in 1902.

=== Bagshawe Glacier ===
64°56′S 62°35′W. A glacier which drains the northeast slopes of Mount Theodore and discharges into Lester Cove. The mouth of the glacier was first seen and sketched by the Belgian Antarctic Expedition (BelgAE) in February 1898. The glacier was first roughly surveyed by K.V. Blaiklock of FIDS from the Norsel in April 1955. Named by UK-APC after T. W. Bagshawe who, with Maxime Charles Lester, wintered at Waterboat Point near Andvord Bay in 1921.

=== Grubb Glacier ===
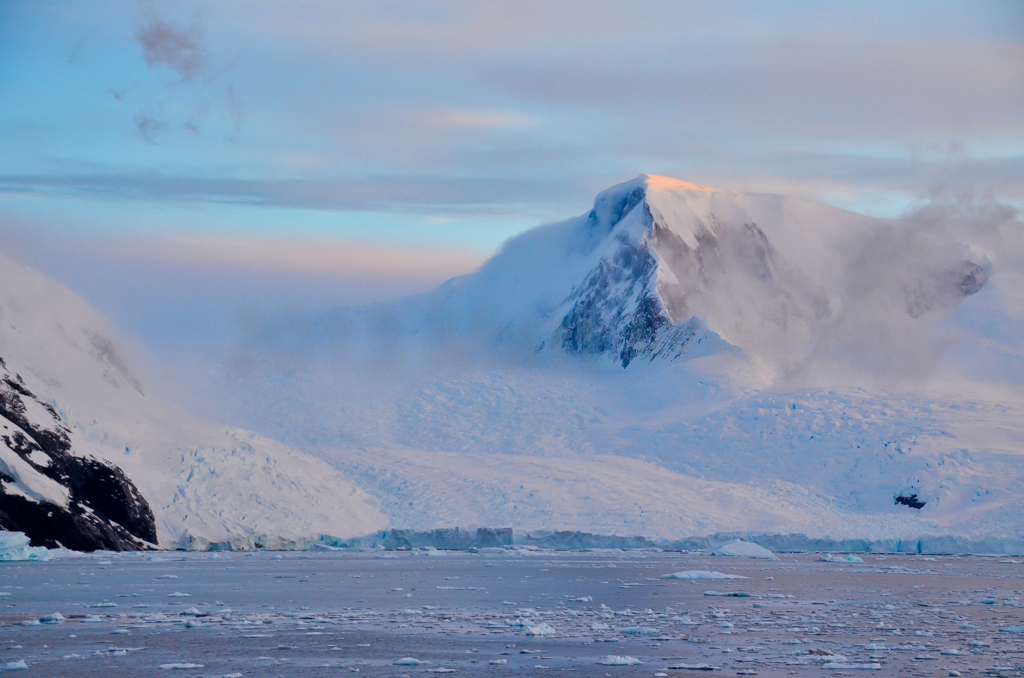
Grubb Glacier, pictured at center, flanked by Mount Inverleith.

64°56′S 62°38′W. Glacier flowing into Lester Cove to the west of Bagshawe Glacier. The glacier appears on an Argentine government chart of 1952. Named by the UK-APC in 1960 for Thomas Grubb (1800-78), Irish optician who designed and introduced the first aplanatic camera lens, in 1857.

== Other features ==
=== Beneden Head ===
64°46′S 62°42′W. A steep-sided headland, 700 metres (2,300 ft) high, forming the north side of the entrance to Andvord Bay. Discovered by the BelgAE, 1897-99, and named after Professor Edouard Van Beneden, president of the Belgica Commission and author of several of the zoological reports of the expedition.

=== Neko Harbour ===
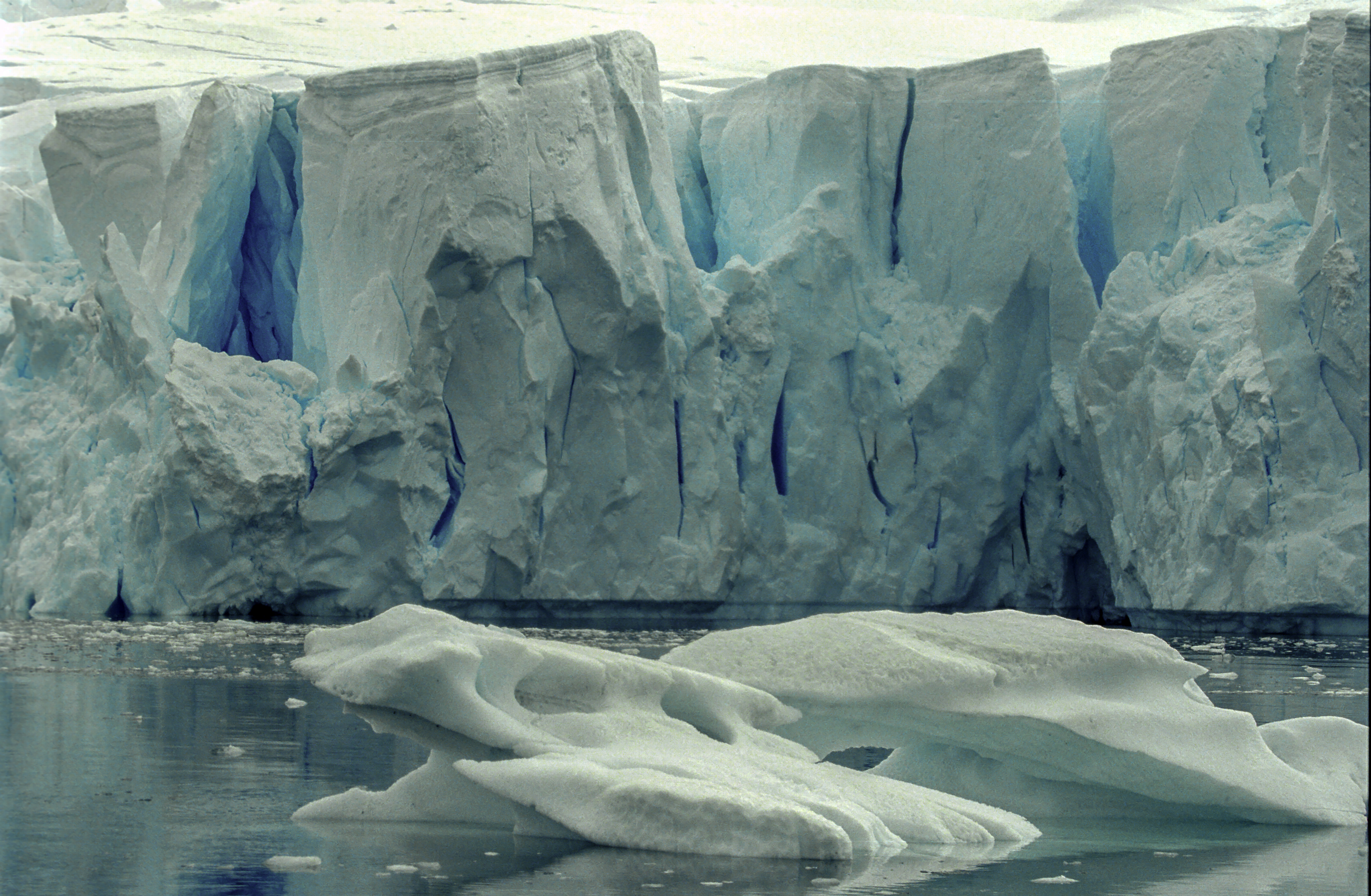
Glacier in Neko Harbour, Antarctica

64°50′S 62°33′W. A small bay indenting the east shore of Andvord Bay 6 nautical miles (11 km; 6.9 mi) southeast of Beneden Head. First seen and roughly charted by the BelgAE under Gerlache, 1897-99. Named after Messrs. Chr. Salvesen's floating factory Neko, which operated in the South Shetland Islands and Antarctic Peninsula area for many seasons between 1911-12 and 1923-24, and which often used this bay. The name was published by the Scottish geologist David Ferguson in 1921, following his visit to this area in 1913.

Neko Harbour is a popular cruise-ship destination.

=== Henryk Cove ===
64°51′30″S 62°24′00″W. A cove in inner part of Andvord Bay. Named after Henryk Arctowski, member of the 1897-1899 Belgian Antarctic Expedition.

=== Forbes Point ===
64°53′S 62°33′W. A point forming the east side of the entrance to Lester Cove. The name Forbes Hill was given by Scottish geologist David Ferguson in 1913-14 to a corner or spur of the plateau escarpment which is not a definable feature. From it, however, a ridge runs down to a prominent point useful for reference purposes, to which the name Forbes has been applied.

=== Mount Tsotsorkov ===
64°56′23″S 62°31′17″W A rocky, partly ice-covered mountain extending 7.6 kilometres (4.7 mi) in a north–south direction, 3 kilometres (1.9 mi) wide and rising to 1,615 metres (5,299 ft) in the northwest foothills of Forbidden Plateau. Situated 11.15 kilometres (6.93 mi) east-southeast of Mount Inverleith. Surmounts Bagshawe Glacier to the southwest, and Andvord Bay and its southernmost part Lester Cove to the north where the ridge ends in Forbes Point. Named after the Bulgarian industrialist Lachezar Tsotsorkov for his sustained support for the Bulgarian Antarctic programme.

=== Lester Cove ===
64°54′S 62°36′W. A cove forming the southernmost part of Andvord Bay. Charted by the BelgAE under Gerlache, 1897-99. Named by the UK-APC in 1960 for Maxime C. Lester (1891-1957), who, with T.W. Bagshawe, wintered at nearby Waterboat Point in 1921.

=== Mount Theodore ===
64°58′S 62°36′W. A mountain 4 nautical miles (7.4 km; 4.6 mi) southeast of Mount Inverleith on the south side of Bagshawe Glacier. Named by Scottish geologist David Ferguson who made a geological reconnaissance in this vicinity from the whale catcher Hanka in 1913.

=== Mount Inverleith ===
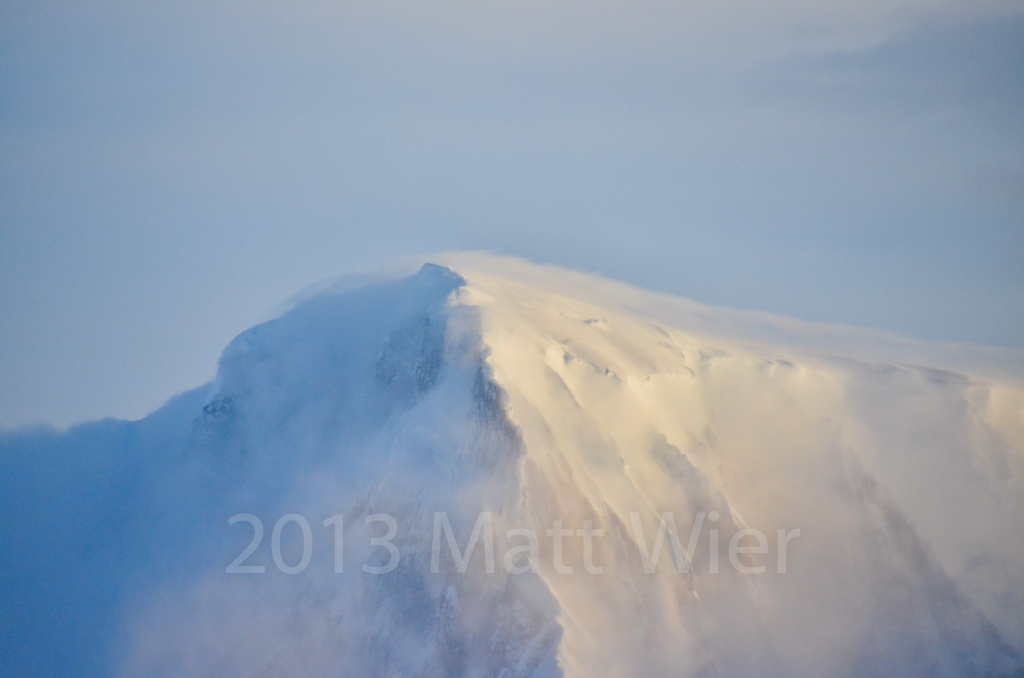
Windswept summit of Mount Inverleith

64°55′S 62°45′W. A mountain, 1,495 metres (4,905 ft) high, standing near the edge of the plateau escarpment 2 nautical miles (3.7 km; 2.3 mi) east-northeast of the head of Skontorp Cove. First charted and named Iverleith Hill by Scottish geologist David Ferguson in 1913-14.

=== Dallmeyer Peak ===
64°53′S 62°45′W. A peak, 1,105 metres (3,625 ft) high, standing 2 nautical miles (3.7 km; 2.3 mi) southwest of Steinheil Point on the south side of Andvord Bay. The peak appears on an Argentine government chart of 1952. Named by the UK-APC in 1960 for John Henry Dallmeyer (1830-83), English (formerly German) optician who independently developed the "rectilinear|photographic lens.

=== Almirante Ice Fringe ===
64°52′00″S 62°41′00″W A narrow ice piedmont bordering the southwest side of Andvord Bay. Named by the Polish Antarctic Expedition, about 1995, after Almirante Brown Station (Argentine) on nearby Coughtrey Peninsula, Paradise Harbor.

=== Steinheil Point ===
64°51′S 62°41′W. A point 5 nautical miles (9.3 km; 5.8 mi) southeast of Duthiers Point on the west side of Andvord Bay. First roughly charted by the BelgAE under Gerlache, 1897-99. Named by the UK-APC in 1960 for Hugo Adolph Steinheil (1832–93), German mathematical optician who designed and introduced an improved aplanatic camera lens in 1866 and, independently, the telephoto lens in 1891.

=== Mount Hoegh ===
64°50′S 62°48′W. A mountain, 890 metres (2,920 ft) high, standing 1.5 nautical miles (2.8 km; 1.7 mi) south-southeast of Duthiers Point on the west coast of Graham Land. Charted by the BelgAE under Gerlache, 1897-99. Named by the UK-APC in 1960 for Emil von Hoegh (1865-1915), German mathematical optician who designed the first double anastigmatic camera lens in 1893.

=== Duthiers Point ===
64°48′S 62°49′W. A point forming the south side of the entrance to Andvord Bay. Discovered by the BelgAE, 1897-99, under Gerlache, who named it "Cap Lacaze-Duthiers" for Félix Henri de Lacaze-Duthiers (1821-1901), French naturalist and authority on the anatomy of mollusks.

== Sources ==
- Alberts, Fred G., ed. (1995), Geographic Names of the Antarctic (PDF) (2 ed.), United States Board on Geographic Names This article incorporates public domain material from websites or documents of the United States Board on Geographic Names.
- "Almirante Ice Fringe", Composite Gazetteer of Antarctica, Scientific Committee on Antarctic Research

REMA Explorer
The Reference Elevation Model of Antarctica (REMA) gives ice surface measurements of most of the continent. When a feature is ice-covered, the ice surface will differ from the underlying rock surface and will change over time. To see ice surface contours and elevation of a feature as of the last REMA update,
- Open the Antarctic REMA Explorer
- Enter the feature's coordinates in the box at the top left that says "Find address or place", then press enter
  The coordinates should be in DMS format, e.g. 65°05'03"S 64°01'02"W. If you only have degrees and minutes, you may not be able to locate the feature.
- Hover over the icons at the left of the screen
- Find "Hillshade" and click on that
  In the bottom right of the screen, set "Shading Factor" to 0 to get a clearer image
- Find "Contour" and click on that
  In the "Contour properties" box, select Contour Interval = 1m
  You can zoom in and out to see the ice surface contours of the feature and nearby features
- Find "Identify" and click on that
  Click the point where the contour lines seem to indicate the top of the feature
  The "Identify" box will appear to the top left. The Orthometric height is the elevation of the ice surface of the feature at this point.

- Antarctic REMA Explorer (Digital Elevation Models created by the Polar Geospatial Center from Maxar imagery), Polar Geospatial Center, University of Minnesota, 2019
- Birkenmajer, Krzystof (1995), "Geology of Gerlache Strait, West Antarctica. I. Arctowski Peninsula" (PDF), Polish Polar Research, 16 (1–2): 47–60
- "Blue Icefalls", Composite Gazetteer of Antarctica, Scientific Committee on Antarctic Research
- Cusick, Allison M.; Gilmore, Robert; Bombosch, Annette; Mascioni, Martina; Almandoz, Gastón O.; Vernet, Maria (2020). "POLAR TOURISM AS AN EFFECTIVE RESEARCH TOOL: Citizen Science in the Western Antarctic Peninsula". Oceanography. 33 (1): 50–61. doi:10.5670/oceanog.2020.101. ISSN 1042-8275. JSTOR 26897835.
- Graham Land and South Shetland Islands, BAS: British Antarctic Survey, 2005
- "Henryk Cove", Composite Gazetteer of Antarctica, Scientific Committee on Antarctic Research
- "FjordEco: Fjord Ecosystem Structure and function on the west Antarctic Peninsula". FjordEco: Fjord Ecosystem Structure and function on the west Antarctic Peninsula.
- Lundesgaard, Øyvind; Winsor, Peter; Truffer, Martin; Merrifield, Mark; Powell, Brian; Statscewich, Hank; Eidam, Emily; Smith, Craig R. (February 2020), "Hydrography and energetics of a cold subpolar fjord: Andvord Bay, western Antarctic Peninsula", Progress in Oceanography, 181
- "Mount Tsotsorkov", Composite Gazetteer of Antarctica, Scientific Committee on Antarctic Research
