= Ferguson Peak =

Mountain in South Georgia

Ferguson Peak (54°47′S 35°50′W) is a peak, 560 metres (1,840 ft) high, standing close west of the head of Cooper Bay in the eastern extremity of South Georgia. It was photographed by Niall Rankin during his visit to South Georgia in 1947. Rankin did not disclose the locality because he wished to protect the fur seals found there and shown in his photo. The photo was identified as the feature now described by the British South Georgia Expedition, 1954–55, and the peak was unofficially named "Fur Seal Peak". Since Bird Island, at the west end of South Georgia, is now the only place where fur seals breed, this name is misleading. A new name, "Ferguson Peak" was recommended by the UK Antarctic Place-Names Committee in 1957 for David Ferguson, a Scottish geologist, who carried out geological investigations in South Georgia in 1911–12 for Messrs. Christian Salvesen and Company.
