= González Videla Antarctic Base =

Videla Station
- Antarctic base
- González Videla Station
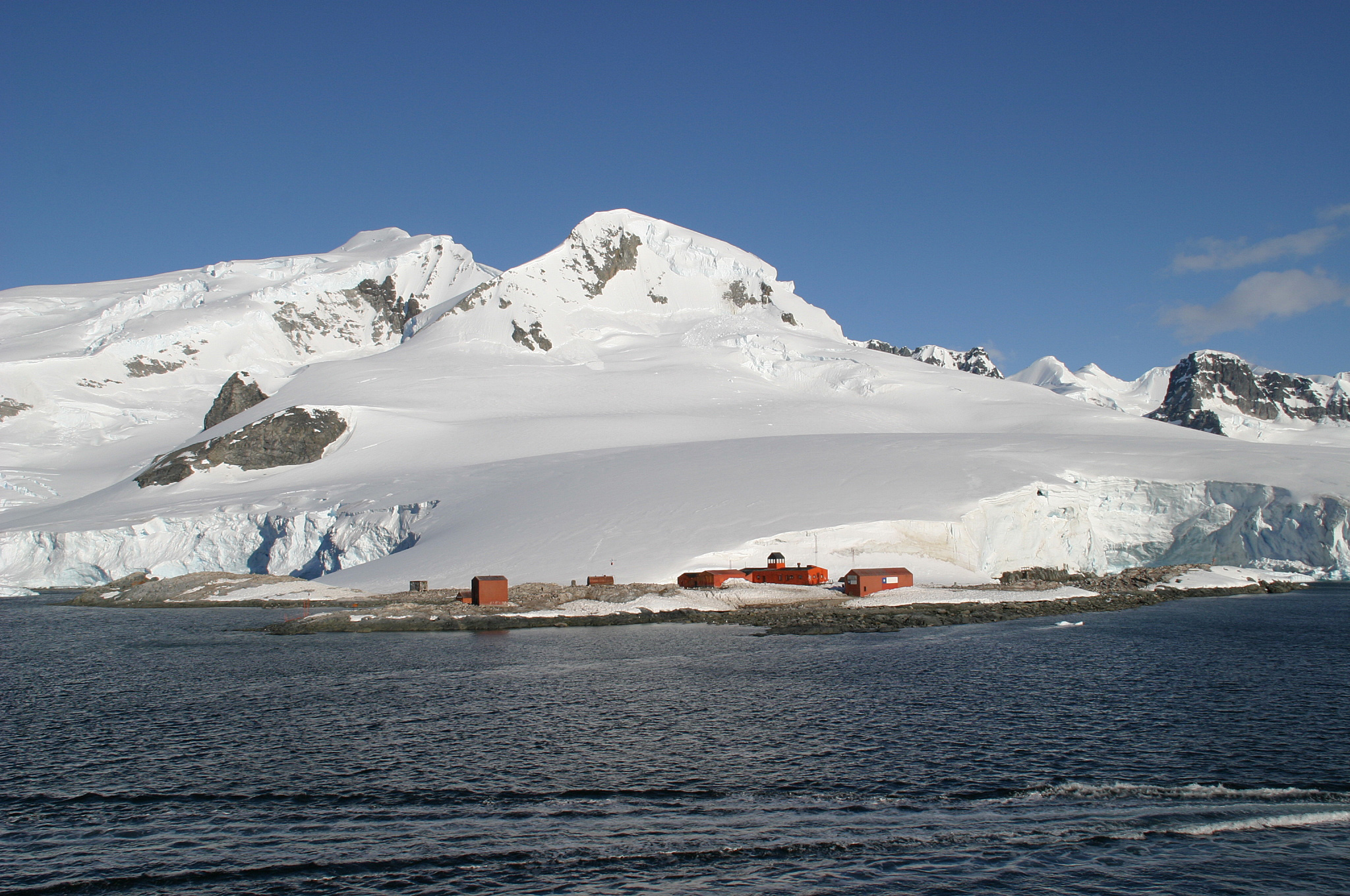
- Antarctic Research Station Gonzales Videla located in Paradise Bay

- Location of Videla Station in Antarctica
- Coordinates: 64°49′26″S 62°51′25″W
- Country: Chile
- Location in Antarctica: Waterboat Point; Graham Land
- Administered by: Instituto Antártico Chileno
- Established: 12 March 1951
- Named after: Gabriel González Videla
- Elevation: 6 m (20 ft)

Population (2017)
  - Summer: 15
  - Winter: 0
- Type: Seasonal
- Period: Summer
- Status: Operational
- Activities: List: Glaciology; Geology; Marine biology
- Website: Chilean Antarctic Institute

González Videla Base is an inactive research station on the Antarctic mainland at Waterboat Point in Paradise Bay. It is named after Chilean President Gabriel González Videla, who in the 1940s became the first chief of state of any nation to visit Antarctica. The station was active from 1951–58, and was reopened briefly in the early 1980s. Occasional summer visits are made by Chilean parties and tourists.

On the north edge of the station there is a sign identifying Waterboat Point as an official historic site under the Antarctic Treaty.

This was the place where the smallest ever wintering-over party (two men) spent a year and a day in 1921-1922. The two men, Thomas Bagshawe and M.C. Lester, had been part of the British Imperial Expedition, but their particular project, which involved flying a number of aircraft to the South Pole, was aborted. Nevertheless, they decided to stay over for the winter and made their shelter in an old whaling boat they found on this site. Their time was not wasted, however, because Bagshawe wrote the first scientific study of penguin breeding development. Today the gentoo penguins, probably descendants of the ones he studied, nest in the ruins of the whaleboat shelter.

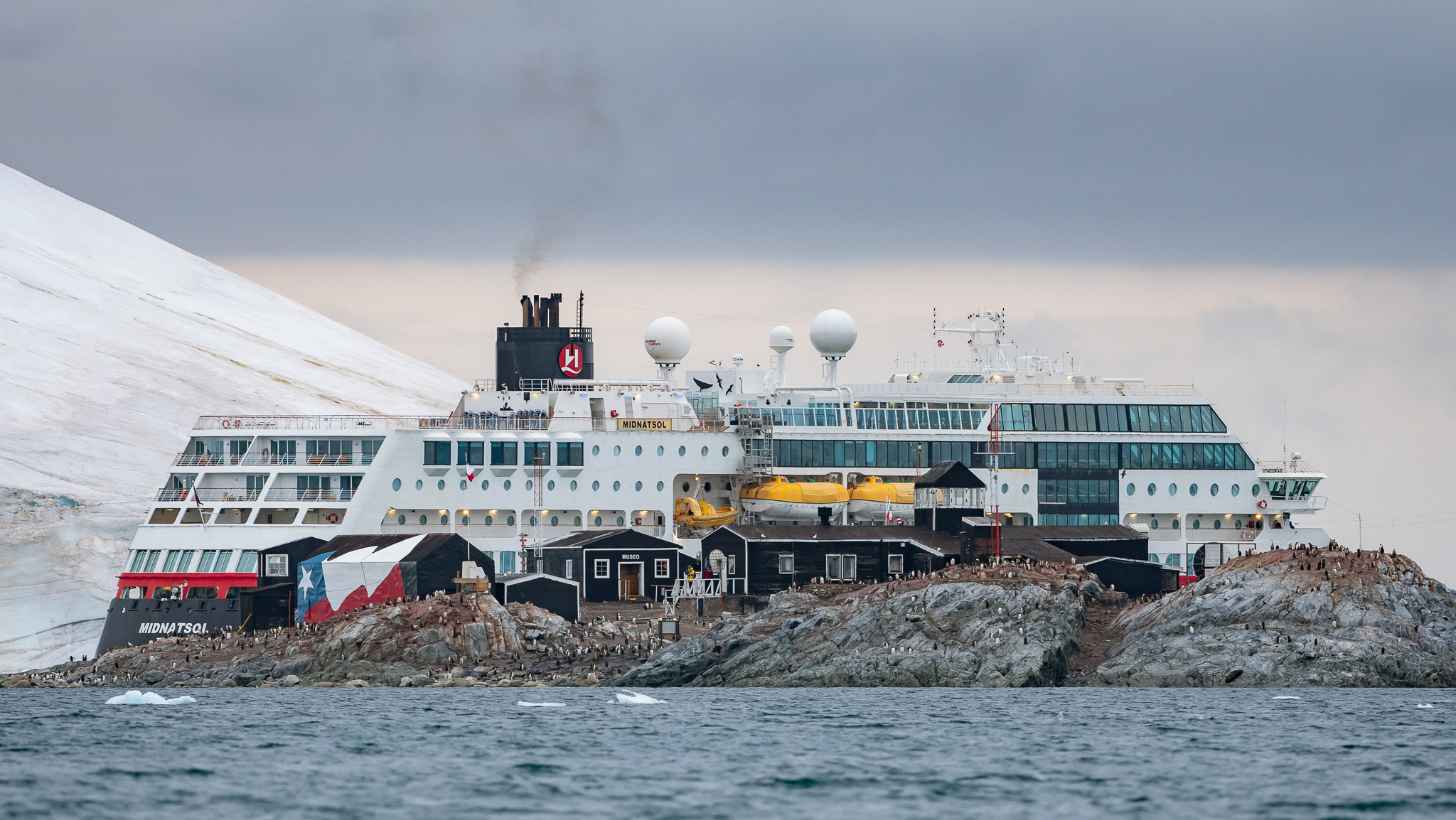
Visit by the Expedition ship MS Midnatsol

== See also ==
- List of Antarctic research stations
- List of Antarctic field camps

== Sources ==
- Antarctica. Sydney: Reader's Digest, 1985, pp. 230–231.
- Lonely Planet, Antarctica: a Lonely Planet Travel Survival Kit, Oakland, CA: Lonely Planet Publications, 1996.
- Stewart, Andrew, Antarctica: An Encyclopedia. London: McFarland and Co., 1990 (2 volumes), pp. 394, 1080.
- U.S. National Science Foundation, Geographic Names of the Antarctic, Fred G. Alberts, ed. Washington: NSF, 1980.
