= Cunningham's triplefin =

Conservation status
- Least Concern (IUCN 3.1)

Scientific classification
- Kingdom: Animalia
- Phylum: Chordata
- Class: Actinopterygii
- Division: Teleostei
- Order: Blenniiformes
- Family: Tripterygiidae
- Genus: Helcogrammoides
- Species: H. cunninghami

Binomial name
- Helcogrammoides cunninghami (Smitt, 1898)

Synonyms
- Tripterygion cunninghami Smitt, 1898

Species of fish

Cunningham's triplefin (Helcogrammoides cunninghami) is a species of triplefin blenny in the genus Helcogrammoides. It was described by Frederik Adam Smitt in 1898, who named it in honour the Scottish naturalist Robert Oliver Cunningham (1841-1918), who had collected specimens of this fish from Puerto Madryn in 1868 but was unable to identify them. This species has been found in Peru, near Lima, Chile, Puerto Madryn in Argentina and the Falkland Islands.
