= Helcogrammoides chilensis =

Conservation status
- Least Concern (IUCN 3.1)

Scientific classification
- Kingdom: Animalia
- Phylum: Chordata
- Class: Actinopterygii
- Order: Blenniiformes
- Family: Tripterygiidae
- Genus: Helcogrammoides
- Species: H. chilensis

Binomial name
- Helcogrammoides chilensis (Cancino in De Buen 1960)

Synonyms
- Tripterygion chilensis Cancino in De Buen, 1960

Species of fish

Helcogrammoides chilensis is a species of triplefin blenny in the genus Helcogrammoides. It was described by C. Cancino in 1960. It is found on the western coast of South America from Chilean Patagonia to the vicinity of Lima, Peru.
