= T. W. Bagshawe =

British explorer, museum curator and folklorist

Thomas Wyatt Bagshawe (18 April 1901 – 28 January 1976) was an explorer, museum curator and folklorist.

== Early life ==
Bagshawe was born in Dunstable, Bedfordshire, on 18 April 1901, and attended Rugby School before reading geology at Cambridge University.

== Graham Land Expedition ==
Sledge flag used by Bagshawe in Antarctica during John Lachlan Cope's Expedition to Graham Land

In 1920, Bagshawe left his studies to take up an opportunity to join the British Graham Land Expedition to Antarctica, to continue mapping the western coastline of the Weddell Sea.

It was a small expedition, made up of only four men and with no ship (their voyage was reliant on Norwegian whaling ships). The expedition arrived in the Antarctic in January 1921, but due to ice blocking their passage through the Antarctic Sound, they did not arrive at their desired location. A scaling back of the expedition's plans resulted, so much so that the expedition's leader, John Lachlan Cope, and the second-in-command, Hubert Wilkins, left in February 1921 (planning to return in 1922 and restart the expedition). However, Bagshawe and the other expedition member, Maxime Charles Lester, wanted to continue their work and – against the advice of the Norwegian whalers they had sailed with - the two men remained, when Cope and Wilkins left.

As their base, Bagshawe and Lester constructed a hut out of an abandoned whalers' water boat and packing cases. They managed to continue their work, carrying out observations of weather conditions, tidal measurements and studies of penguins, before being picked up by a Norwegian whaling ship in January 1922. It remains the smallest ever expedition to over winter on Antarctica.

On his return, Bagshawe was a Director of Bagshawe and Co - an iron founders established by his father - from 1925 to 1947. He wrote up his experiences in Two Men in the Antarctic. Later, the Bagshawe Glacier, on the Danco coast of Antarctica, was named after him.

== Second World War ==
During the Second World War Bagshawe served in the Royal Air Force Volunteer Reserve and in Combined Operations.

== Museum curator and folklorist ==
Bagshawe had a close interest in the history and folklore of Bedfordshire: between 1928 and 1947 he was the honorary curator, later honorary director, of Luton Museum. In 1940 he became the Curator of the Cambridge Folk Museum, before handing curatorship of the museum to Enid Porter in 1947.

In 1933 he was awarded the Museum Association's diploma. He was elected a Fellow of the Society of Antiquaries of London in 1928 and of the Royal Historical Society in 1932.

Bagshawe was also a member of the Folklore Society, often submitting to its journal, news from museums with folklore and folk life collections. Bagshawe served as President of the Folklore Society in 1955 and was also elected a Fellow of both the Society of Antiquaries and the Royal Historical Society.

== Selected publications ==
- Bagshawe, Thomas Wyatt (1939). Two men in the Antarctic: an Expedition to Graham Land 1920-1922. Cambridge. OCLC 472189256.
- Bagshawe, Thomas Wyatt (1940). Pompey was a Penguin. London: Oxford University Press. OCLC 156587984.
