= Maria Vernet =

- Education: University of Washington
- Awards: Accomplished Scientist Fellow for 2018 Biological Sciences - The American Association for the Advancement of Science
- Scientific career
- Workplaces: Scripps Institution of Oceanography

Maria Vernet is an Argentine-American marine ecologist whose research focuses on phytoplankton and marine ecosystems, particularly in the Arctic and Antarctic. She has been affiliated with the Scripps Institution of Oceanography in San Diego, California, for much of her career, where she currently serves as an emeritus researcher/professor.

== Education ==
Vernet completed her undergraduate degree in biology at the University of Buenos Aires and later moved to the United States for graduate studies. She attended the University of Washington, where she earned a Master of Science in Biological Oceanography in 1981 and a Ph.D. in the same field in 1983.

== Career and impact ==
Vernet began her affiliation with Scripps Institution of Oceanography as a postdoctoral fellow in 1986 and became a formal researcher there in 1991. Her work focuses on the distribution and abundance of phytoplankton, investigating how these microscopic organisms contribute to the marine food web and global carbon cycle.

Over several decades, Vernet has participated in more than 40 oceanographic research expeditions, conducting extensive fieldwork in the Southern Ocean, including studies in the Weddell Gyre. Her research has examined a wide range of environmental changes affecting polar marine ecosystems. Vernet was a part of one of the earliest research teams to investigate how increased ultraviolet radiation from the Antarctic ozone hole affected marine phytoplankton. Her recent projects have focused on ice-phytoplankton interactions, ecological responses to ice shelf breakups, and the impact of glacial meltwater on Antarctic and Greenland Fjord coastal ecosystems.

Vernet is also involved in citizen science through the FjordPhyto project, which collaborates with the Antarctic tourism industry to collect long-term data on phytoplankton in the Antarctic Peninsula.

== Awards and honors ==
In 2018, Vernet was elected to the American Association for the Advancement of Science (AAAS) as a Fellow for Biological Sciences. She was cited for her distinguished contributions to polar marine ecology, especially with regard to polar ice shelf breakup and ice melt.
