= David Ferguson (geologist) =

Scottish explorer and engineer

- Born: c. 1857
- Died: 1936
- Education: University of Glasgow

David Ferguson (c. 1857 – 1936) was a Scottish explorer, mining engineer and prospector.

An alumnus of the University of Glasgow, he is most known for explorations in Antarctica on private geological survey expeditions for the Scottish company, Christian Salvesen between 1911 and 1915. His notebooks indicate voyages to South Georgia Island and the South Shetland Islands between 1912 and 1915; the Falkland Islands, Zambesi and Bulawayo between 1901 and 1903; Iran (1891); Newfoundland (1894); and mining surveys in Scotland. He is credited with naming several geographic locations in the south Atlantic region and Antarctica, and Ferguson Peak on South Georgia was named in his honour.
