= Kershaw Peaks =

Mountain in Antarctica

The Kershaw Peaks (64°56′S 63°8′W) are a group of five main peaks, the highest at 820 metres (2,700 ft), standing west of the mouth of Miethe Glacier on the west coast of Graham Land, Antarctica. They were shown on an Argentine government chart of 1952, and were named by the UK Antarctic Place-Names Committee in 1960 for Dennis Kershaw of the Falkland Islands Dependencies Survey, assistant surveyor at the Arthur Harbour station in 1956 and at the Danco Island station in 1957.
