= Bryde Island =

Island in Nunavut, Canada

- Location within Nunavut

Geography
- Location: Queen Maud Gulf
- Coordinates: 68°37′N 100°50′W
- Archipelago: Arctic Archipelago

Administration
- Canada
- Territory: Nunavut
- Region: Kitikmeot

Bryde Island is a hypsographic island in the Queen Maud Gulf within the Kitikmeot Region of Nunavut, Canada.
