= Van Rysselberghe family =

Belgian family

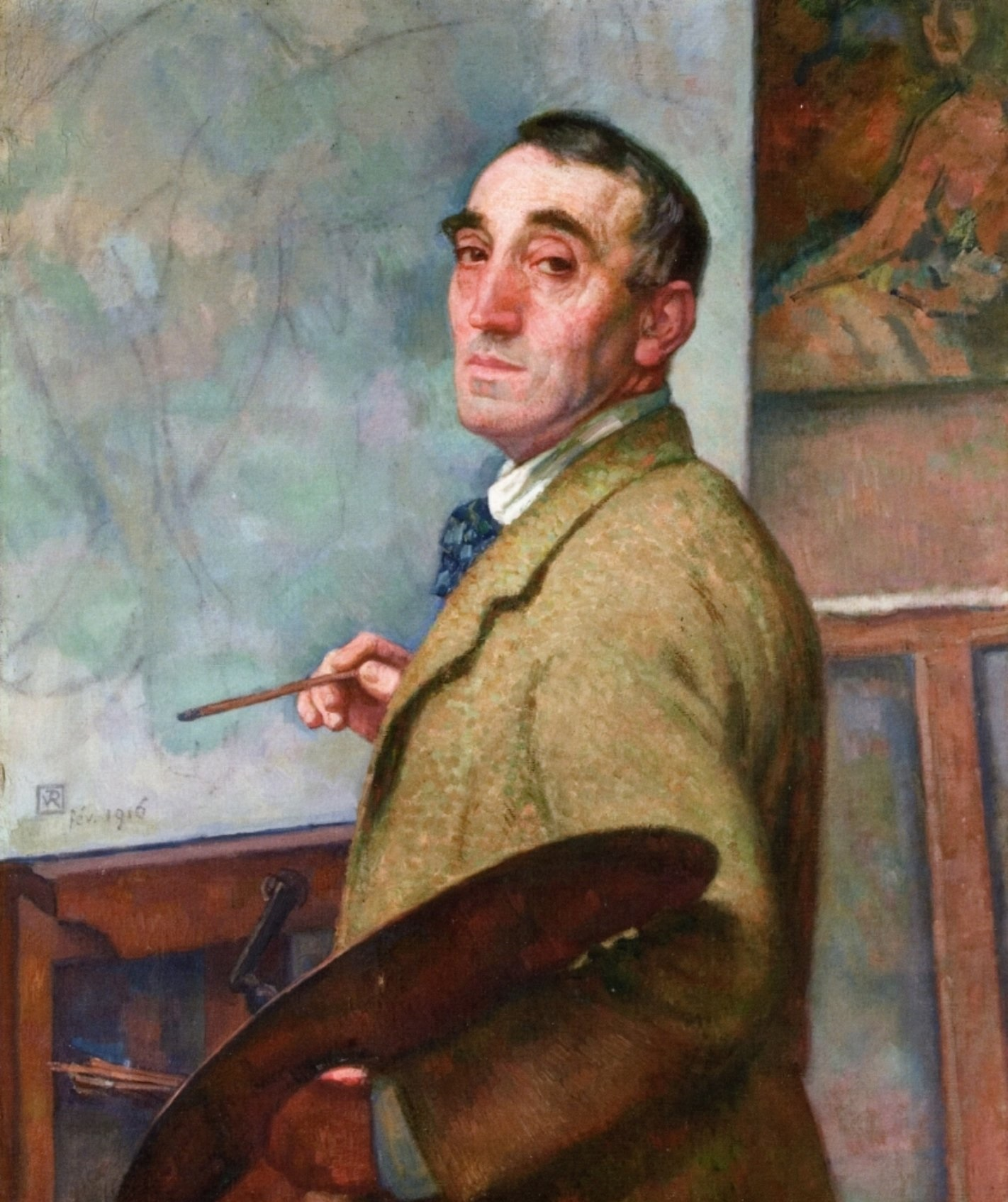
Théo van Rysselberghe, self-portrait

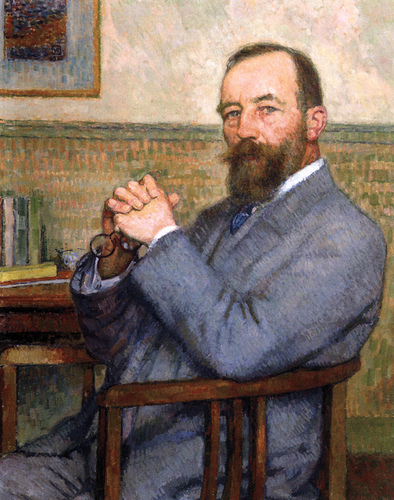
Octave van Rysselberghe, by Théo van Rysselberghe

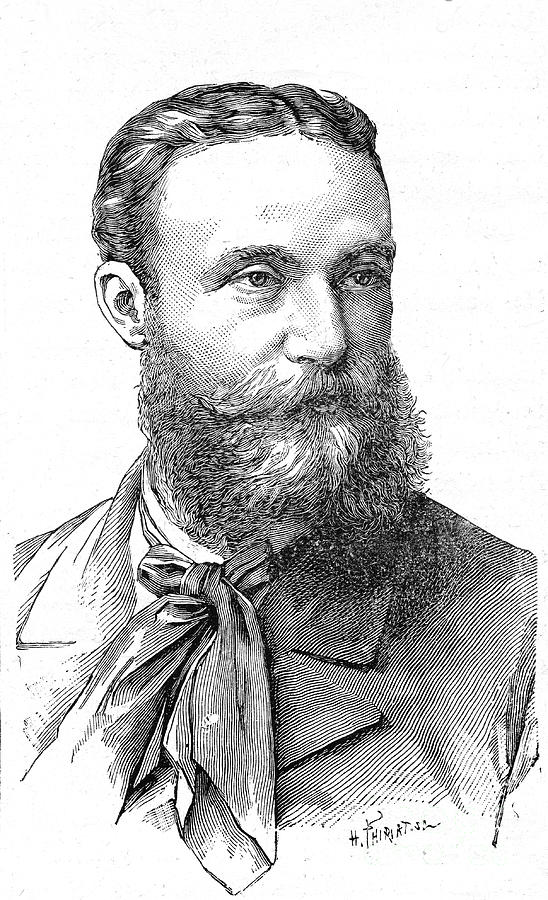
François van Rysselberghe, by Henri Thiriat

The Van Rysselberghe family is a Belgian family, originating in Ghent, which produced a number of artists and intellectuals. Jean-Baptist van Rysselberghe was a carpenter and entrepreneur who established himself in Ghent. He had six children, five of whom became prominent artists and scientists. The most distinguished member of the family was neo-impressionist painter Théo van Rysselberghe, Jean-Baptist's youngest son. Members of the family have included:

- Jean-Baptiste van Rysselberghe (1820–1892) carpenter and entrepreneur.
  - François van Rysselberghe (1846–1893), scientist and inventor, son of Jean-Baptiste.
    - Max van Rysselberghe (1878–1952), engineer, son of François.
      - Enrique van Rysselberghe Martínez (1911–1984), politician, mayor of Concepción, son of Max.
        - Enrique van Rysselberghe Varela (1937–2013), architect, businessman and politician, son of Enrique.
          - Jacqueline van Rysselberghe (born 1965), surgeon and Chilean senator, daughter of Enrique Jr.
          - Enrique van Rysselberghe Herrera (born 1976), engineer and Chilean senator, son of Enrique Jr.
  - Charles van Rysselberghe (1850–1920), architect, son of Jean-Baptiste.
  - Julien Marie van Rysselberghe (1852–1931), engineer and professor, son of Jean-Baptiste.
  - Octave van Rysselberghe (1855–1929), architect, son of Jean-Baptiste.
  - Théo van Rysselberghe (1862–1926), painter, son of Jean-Baptiste.
    - Élisabeth van Rysselberghe (1890–1980), translator, daughter of Théo.
      - Catherine Gide (1923–2013), daughter of Élisabeth.

== The family ==
The Van Rysselberghe family is recorded as early as in the 17th century in Laarne, Flanders, where on 14 May 1695 Jacques van Rysselberghe married Andrée Crabeels.

Jean-Baptist van Rysselebrghe, a carpenter and wheelwright by trade, established himself in Ghent as an entrepreneur. He married Mélanie Rommens, with whom he had six children, including five sons, who would rise to fame as prominent artists and intellectuals. They were François van Rysselberghe (1846 – 1893), Charles van Rysselberghe (1850 – 1920), Julien Marie van Rysselberghe (1852 – 1931), Octave van Rysselberghe (1855 – 1929), and Théo van Rysselberghe (1862 – 1926).

Théo van Rysselberghe was a prominent painter, who played a pivotal role in the European art scene at the turn of the twentieth century. After him, the most prominent member of the family is perhaps François. He was a scientist and inventor, a forerunner and inventor of numerous devices in the fields of meteorology and telephony. Octave and Charles were both architects, whereas Julien Marie was an engineer of bridges and roads, as well as a professor of engineering at Ghent University. Jean-Baptist and Mélanie had also a daughter, Sylvia-Maria, who married a Chilean engineer.

Théo van Rysselberghe married Maria Monnom from Brussels in 1889. Their daughter, Élisabeth van Rysselberghe, had a daughter, Catherine, with writer André Gide.

Max van Rysselberghe, a son of François, became engineer and embarked on a scientific expedition to Antarctica (the Belgian Antarctic Expedition) at the end of the 19th century, when he wasn't yet 20 years old. The expedition was supposed to last six months, but the ship became trapped in the ice and they were forced to winter in the Antarctic region, the first expedition to do so. The ice that blocked the ship didn't melt in the summer, so they decided to cut a channel to reach the open sea. Max van Rysselberghe used explosive to break the ice. Thus the presumed dead crew was able to return to Belgium after setting foot on Chile in Punta Arenas. Back in Belgium, Max van Rysselberghe met Isabel Martínez, daughter of Chilean engineer Valentín Martínez. In 1905, Van Rysselberghe went again to Chile. He took charge of several regulatory plans for towns near Santiago and Valparaíso before settling in Concepción. He and Isabel had four children: Lidia, Ivonne, Enrique and Daniel. Enrique became director de obra in Concepción and later in life was elected regidor and then mayor of the city. He married Julieta Varela, by whom he had four children: Javier, Enrique, Ivonne and Astrid. Enrique Jr. became a deputy and married María Norma Herrera. They had five children, the eldest of whom is Chilean surgeon and senator Jacqueline van Rysselberghe, while the penultimate is Chilean engineer and senator Enrique van Rysselberghe Herrera.

The Chilean Van Rysselberghe live chiefly in Concepción, with some branches in Santiago, Chillán and Linares.
