= Enrique van Rysselberghe =

Enrique van Rysselberghe may refer to:

- Enrique van Rysselberghe Martínez (1911–1984), Chilean architect and politician
- Enrique van Rysselberghe Varela (1937–2013), Chilean architect, businessman and politician, son of Enrique van Rysselberghe Martínez
- Enrique van Rysselberghe Herrera (born 1976), Chilean engineer and politician, son of Enrique van Rysselberghe Varela
