= Rysselberghe =

Rysselberghe may refer to:

- Van Rysselberghe family, Belgian family of artists
- Théo van Rysselberghe (1862–1926), Belgian neo-impressionist painter, after whom is named:
  - 18643 van Rysselberghe, an asteroid.
- Bernard Van Rysselberghe (1905–1984), Belgian cyclist.
- Dorian van Rijsselberghe (born 1988), Dutch sailor.
- Jacqueline van Rysselberghe (born 1965), Chilean politician.
