= Élisabeth van Rysselberghe =

Belgian translator

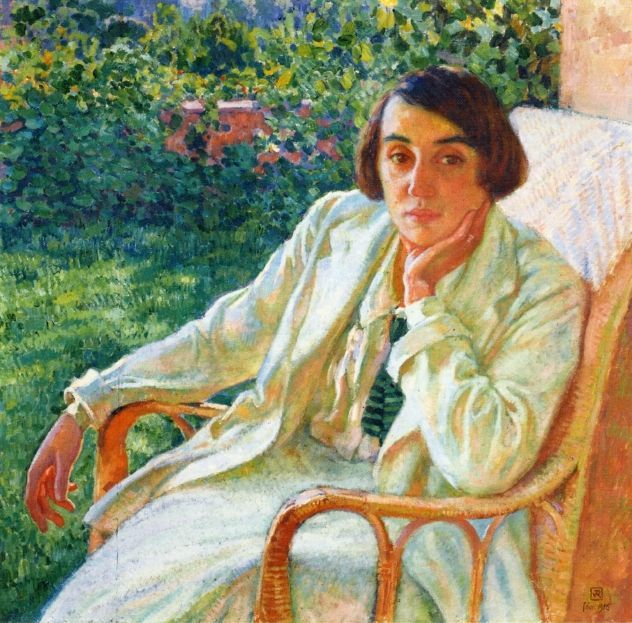
- Painting of Élisabeth by Théo van Rysselberghe, 1916
- Born: 15 October 1890 Brussels, Belgium
- Died: 29 July 1980 (aged 89) Neuilly-sur-Seine, Île-de-France, France
- Occupation: Translator
- Spouse: Pierre Herbart (m. 1931; div. 1968)
- Children: Catherine Gide
- Parents: Théo van Rysselberghe; Maria Monnom

Élisabeth van Rysselberghe (15 October 1890 – 29 July 1980) was a Belgian translator. She was the daughter of Belgian painter Théo van Rysselberghe.

== Biography ==
Élisabeth van Rysselberghe was born on 15 October 1890 in Brussels, Belgium. She was the daughter of neo-impressionist painter Théo van Rysselberghe and his wife Maria Monnom. As a child, she became acquainted with André Gide, a close friend of her parents, and the two became good friends.

Élisabeth had an affair with Rupert Brooke when she was twenty years old, and by 1913 the two might have become lovers "in a complete sense". However, Brooke, who was involved also with other women, died during World War I.

After the war, in 1920, Marc Allégret, Gide's lover, fell in love with Élisabeth. The two had wanted a child, but the wish did not come true. In 1923, Élisabeth gave birth to a child, Catherine. The father was André Gide, who at the time was married, and recognised the child only after the death of his wife, adopting her in 1938. Élisabeth had wanted a child "at all costs", while Gide had passed her a note during a trip on the train with friends years before, where he explained that he could not bear to see her or himself childless. Eventually, Élisabeth married French journalist Pierre Herbart in 1931. After her marriage to Herbart, the friendship between the latter and Gide was upset. The two divorced in 1968.

She was an avid reader and an excellent translator. She translated Donald Windham and John Keats into French. She translated the Letters of John Keats with Charles Du Bos, including Quatre lettres inédites and Lettre à John Hamilton Reynolds. Van Rysselberghe is the French translator of Windham's The Dog Star (French: Canicule) and Emblems of Conduct (French: Emblèmes d'une vie). In 1953, her translation of Justin O'Brien's Les nourritures terrestres d'André Gide et les Bucoliques de Virgile was published.

She died on 29 July 1980 in Neuilly-sur-Seine, Île-de-France, France.

== Works ==
=== Author ===
- Lettres à la Petite Dame. Un petit à la campagne (juin 1924 – décembre 1926). Edited by Catherine Gide (Paris: Éditions Gallimard, 2000).

=== Translator ===
- Keats, John. The Letters of John Keats, with Charles Du Bos.
- Keats, John. Quatre lettres inédites in La Revue hebdomadaire, with Charles Du Bos (Paris: Plon, 1921).
- Keats, John. Lettre à John Hamilton Reynolds in Les Écrits nouveaux, with Charles Du Bos (Paris: Émile-Paul Frères, 1921)
- O'Brien, Justin. Les nourritures d'André Gide et les Bucoliques de Virgile (Boulogne-Billancourt: Editions de la Revue Pretexte, 1953).
- Windham, Donald. The Dog Star (Paris: Éditions Gallimard, 1954).
- Windham, Donald. Emblems of Conduct (Paris: Éditions Gallimard, 1968).
