= Liberation of Rennes =

- Part of the liberation of France
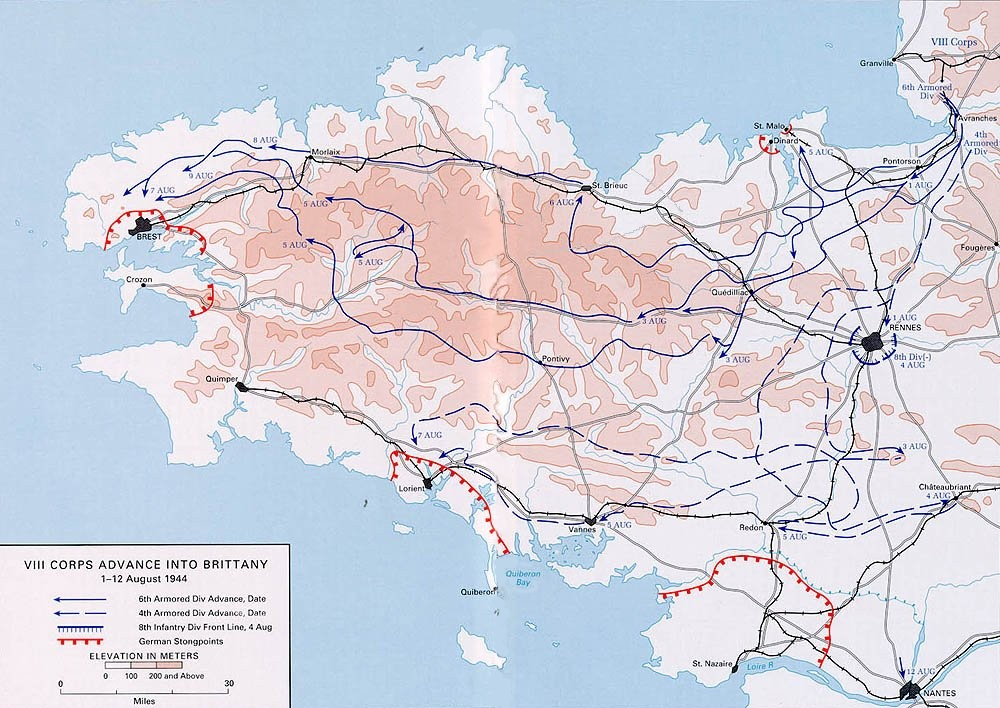
- US advancement into Brittany in WW2
Date	4 August 1944
Location	Rennes, France
Result	Allied victory

Belligerents
United States; Free France	(Nazi Germany) Germany; Bezen Perrot

Commanders and leaders
(United States) George Patton (United States) John Shirley Wood (Free France) Pierre Herbart (Free France) Yves Milon	(Nazi Germany) Eugen König (Nazi Germany) Paul Hausser

Units involved
(United States) 8th Infantry Division (Free France) French Forces of the Interior	(Nazi Germany) XXV Army Corps

Casualties and losses
At least 50 killed; 20 captured	At least 60 killed; At least 130 injured

The liberation of Rennes, along with its surrounding settlements, took place on 4 August 1944 by the joint action of the French Forces of the Interior (FFI) and the 8th Infantry Division of the United States Army led by General Georges S. Patton, ending four years of occupation of the city by the Nazi Germans as part of the liberation of Brittany.

== Historical background ==
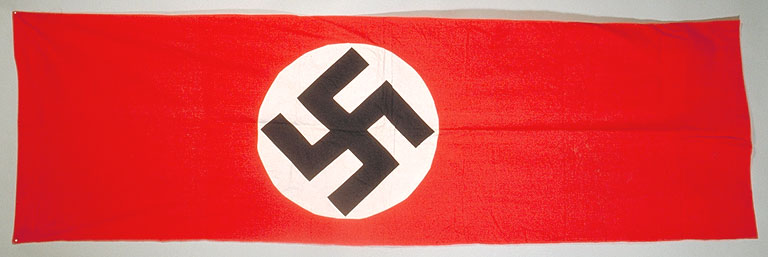
Nazi flag recovered in Rennes

The city has been captured since 18 June 1940 by German troops without resistance, after the France's defeat in the Battle of France.

Rennes faced bombardment numerous times in June 1944 during the Battle of Normandy. On June 8, American Martin B-26 Marauder bombers were ordered to bomb the marshalling yard used by the 17th SS Panzergrenadier Division which was moving up to northern France to confront the Allied bridgehead in Normandy. In 9 June the Royal Air Force bombed strategic German targets. Three days later, US Air Force Boeing B-17 Flying Fortress, again, carried out several raids on the city, some of which were intercepted by Messerschmitt Bf 109 and others shot down by Flak guns of the German anti-aircraft defense force.

After the success of Operation Cobra and the ensuing breakthrough at Avranches July 1944, the Allies' trampling on the Operation Overlord ends and the liberation of Brittany begins.

Initially wishing to bypass Rennes in order to charge on Brest Lorient and Saint-Nazaire, the main Breton ports, which had been transformed, for the most part, into by the Wehrmacht, the Americans found themselves blocked in Rennes by the resistance of multiple German units.

== Course of the battle ==
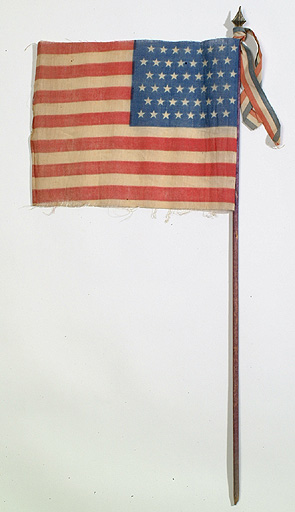
United States Flag recovered in Rennes

On 1 August 1944, while the Americans had just liberated Avranches, the progression of a spearhead from the 4th Armored Division was hampered at 3 p.m. by a German anti-aircraft unit at a place called Maison-Blanche. Eleven M4 Sherman tanks and three half-tracks, killing 50 soldiers, wounding 20, and 20 others were captured. The Saint-Laurent church, to the north, serving as an observatory for the German gunners, was destroyed as well.

American artillery then hit the city. On August 2, due to communication problems in the American General Staff and the absence of infantry available to penetrate the city, no progress was made and Major-General John Shirley Wood had Rennes bypassed to the west with his combat groups A and B, going down to Châteaubriant, but he was forced to move towards Vannes and Lorient when he wanted to go back to Angers in the direction of Paris. This halt in front of Rennes had two harmful consequences; on the morning of 3 August, the Germans sent off a train of 800 resistance fighters and 400 Allied prisoners in the direction of Germany and, on the night of the 3 to the 4th of August, Colonel Eugen König received authorization from General Paul Hausser, commanding the 7th Army, to evacuate the city being encircled. The servants of the German DCA batteries evacuate after having put them out of service. On the evening of 3 August, units of the 8th US Infantry Division had launched an assault against the city in the Gantelles sector. On the morning of the 4th, soldiers of the 13th infantry regiment of the 8th division entered the town around 9:00 am without encountering any resistance.

On 3 August at the end of the afternoon, the town hall of Rennes had been controlled by the Resistance, under the orders of Pierre Herbart, and Yves Milon, appointed president of the special delegation. His mastery of English, necessary for relations with the American army, would have been a decisive asset in his appointment to this post. The Vichy mayor, René Patay, and his deputies and secretaries were ousted. The Germans tried to set fire to the building, but it was quickly brought under control. On 4 August, the resistance fighter Victor Pierre Le Gorgeu takes office as Commissioner of the Republic instituted by the Provisional Government of the French Republic, installed by Pierre Herbart.

General de Gaulle thus succeeded in setting up his administration in the first major liberated city in France, avoiding the establishment of an allied military government in the occupied territories, the Allied Military Government in Occupied Territories (AMGOT).

The scattered units under the command of Colonel Eugen König will retreat towards Saint-Nazaire. During their retreat, several fights opposed them to the FFI and the Americans, because the surrounding areas had already been liberated. 60 German soldiers were thus killed and 130 others wounded in total.
