= Jacqueline van Rysselberghe =

Chilean surgeon and politician

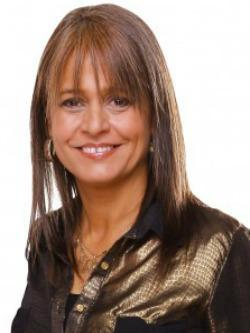
- Van Rysselberghe in 2014

President of the UDI Party
- In office 7 January 2017 – 22 December 2020
- Preceded by: Hernán Larraín
- Succeeded by: Javier Macaya

Member of the Senate
- In office 11 March 2014 – 11 March 2022
- Preceded by: Hosain Sabag
- Constituency: 12th Circumscription

Intendent of the Biobío Region
- In office 11 March 2010 – 3 April 2011
- Preceded by: Jaime Tohá González
- Succeeded by: Víctor Lobos del Fierro

Mayor of Concepción
- In office 6 December 2000 – 10 March 2010
- Preceded by: Ariel Ulloa Azócar
- Succeeded by: Patricio Kuhn Artigues

Personal details
- Born: 3 February 1965 (age 61) Concepción, Chile
- Parent(s): Enrique van Rysselberghe Varela; María Norma Herrera Caire

Jacqueline van Rysselberghe Herrera (Note: Spanish: [ɟʝaˈklim ban riselˈβeɾɣe (e)ˈreɾa], Dutch: [ʑɑkəˈliɱ vɑn ˈrɛisəlˌbɛrɣə ʔɛˈrɛraː]. In isolation, the first name is pronounced [ɟʝaˈklin] in Spanish and [ʑɑkəˈlin] in Dutch.) (born 3 February 1965) is a Chilean psychiatrist and politician. She is a member of the right-wing party Independent Democratic Union (UDI) was National Senator from 2014 to 2022.

She was mayor of Concepción from 2000 until her resignation in March 2010 to take the office of Intendant of the Biobío Region. Previously, she had been a city council member since 1992. On 3 April 2011 she resigned as Intendant.

== Family ==
Her surname comes from Flanders, Belgium. Her great-grandfather was Max van Rysselberghe, an engineer who left Belgium when he was about 20 years old on what was originally planned to be a six-month-long scientific expedition to Antarctica. The expedition lasted two years.

Reports of her connection to the Pierre Van Rysselberghe dynasty are, at this point, unverified. During the first year, plans to return to Europe were abandoned when the ice in the waterways failed to thaw during the summer. In Belgium, Max met Isabel Martínez, the daughter of Valentin Martínez, Chilean Minister of Public Works, who at that time had escaped to Belgium after the coup in Chile. Max and Isabel were married in Europe, and in 1905 left for Chile. This couple had four children, Lydia, Yvonne, and Henry, the grandfather of Jacqueline and Daniel.

== Biography ==
She was born on 3 February 1965 in Concepción. She is the daughter of Enrique van Rysselberghe Varela and María Norma Herrera Caire and the sister of Enrique van Rysselberghe Herrera, as well as granddaughter of Enrique Van Rysselberghe Martínez, a member of the National Party and Mayor of Concepción between 1971 and 1972 and again from 1975 to 1979.

She is married to Mauricio Pávez and is the mother of six children: Tomás, Catalina, Valentina, Natalia, Magdalena, and Fernanda.

Van Rysselberghe completed her primary and secondary education at the Lycée Charles de Gaulle–Alliance Française of Concepción. She later studied medicine at the University of Concepción, where she obtained the professional degree of Medical Doctor. She subsequently completed postgraduate studies in psychiatry and a diploma in Psychotherapy.

After obtaining her medical degree, between 1992 and 1996, she worked at the Psychiatry Service of the Hospital of Concepción, in a medical center, and in private practice. In parallel, she carried out human resources consultancy work for companies in the region. She also engaged in teaching activities in the Social Work program at the San Sebastián University in Concepción.

== Political career ==
Van Rysselberghe became involved in politics during her years as a medical student as a member of the Independent University Movement, linked to the Guildist Movement, and led a list in the elections of the Federation of Students of the University of Concepción. She participated in the "Yes" campaign during the 1988 plebiscite and later served as regional head of the youth organization supporting the presidential campaign of Hernán Büchi in the 1989 elections. She is a member of the Independent Democratic Union (UDI) and was elected vice-president of the party for the periods 2004–2006 and 2006–2008.

In the 1992 municipal elections, she was elected councillor of the Municipality of Concepción, a position she held until 2000. During this period, she was appointed first general coordinator of the Association of Families of Children Victims of Rape and Murder, which later became the Amparo y Justicia Foundation. In the 2000 municipal elections, she was elected Mayor of Concepción representing the UDI, and was re-elected in 2004 and 2008. She later served as campaign manager for Joaquín Lavín in the 2005 presidential elections, and for her brother Enrique van Rysselberghe Herrera in the 2009 parliamentary elections.

During the administration of President Sebastián Piñera, she was appointed Intendant of the Biobío Region, a position she held from 11 March 2010 until her resignation on 3 April 2011. In the 2013 parliamentary elections, she was elected Senator for the 12th Senatorial District, Biobío Region, with 128,451 votes, equivalent to 27.87% of the valid votes cast. She later served as President of the National Executive Committee of the UDI between January 2017 and December 2020, becoming the first woman to hold the position, and was re-elected in 2018.

In the parliamentary elections held on 21 November 2021, she ran for the Senate for the 16th Senatorial District, Ñuble Region, but was not elected, obtaining 21,771 votes, equivalent to 12.45% of the valid votes cast. In July 2024, she assumed the position of vice-president of the UDI.
