= Dog Star (disambiguation) =

The Dog Star is a nickname for Sirius, a star in the constellation Canis Major (Greater Dog).

Dog Star or Dogstar may also refer to:

- "Dog Star" (short story) by Arthur C. Clarke
- Dogstar (TV series), a 2006 animated Australian series
- The Dog Star, a 1950 novel by Donald Windham
- The Dog Stars, a 2012 novel by Peter Heller
  - The Dog Stars (film), adapting Heller's novel

== Music ==
- Dogstar (band), a rock group including Keanu Reeves
- "Dogstar", a song by Hybrid from the 2006 album I Choose Noise
- "Dog Star", a song by Klaatu from the 1980 album Endangered Species
