= Van Rysselberghe =

Van Rysselberghe is a Dutch surname. Notable people with the surname include:

- Van Rysselberghe family, Belgian family of artists
- Bernard Van Rysselberghe (1905–1984), Belgian cyclist
- Dorian van Rijsselberghe (born 1988), Dutch sailor
