= Max van Rysselberghe =

Belgian-born Chilean engineer and Antarctic explorer

- Max van Rysselberghe
- Born: 19 December 1878; Ixelles, Brussels, Belgium
- Died: 1961 (aged 82–83); Santiago, Chile
- Children: 4, including Enrique
- Parent: François van Rysselberghe
- Engineering career
- Employer: Railway Company of Chile

Max van Rysselberghe (Dutch pronunciation: [ˈmɑks fɑn ˈrɛisəlˌbɛrɣə]; 19 December 1878 – 1961) was a Belgian-born Chilean engineer and Antarctic explorer.

== Biography ==
Max van Rysselberghe was born in Ixelles, Brussels, on 19 December 1878. He was born into the Van Rysselberghe family, a prominent family of artists and academics originally from Ghent. His father, François van Rysselberghe, was a Belgian scientist who was a forerunner and inventor of numerous devices in the fields of meteorology and telephony.

In 1897, Van Rysselberghe took part in the Belgian Antarctic Expedition as an engineer. They set sail from Antwerp on 16 August 1897. It was the first expedition to winter in Antarctica. However, after reaching the coast of Graham Land in January and crossing the Antarctic Circle on 15 February, they became trapped in the ice of the Bellinghausen Sea, near Peter I Island, on 28 February. They experienced shortage of food and were forced to hunt penguins and seals. Van Rysselberghe and sailor Van Mirlo devised a snow melter by altering the condenser so it could burn seal blubber. They placed the device on the deck, and thanks to it the crew was supplied with water.

The ice didn't melt in the summer, so in February 1899 they decided to cut trenches to reach the open water. Van Rysselberghe broke the ice with explosive, and the crew was able to dig a channel with various tools. They reached open sea in the middle of March, and after being seriously threatened by a gale, managed to enter Cockburn Channel, reaching Punta Arenas at the end of the same month. They finally dropped anchor at Antwerp on 6 November 1899.

Back in his home country, Van Rysselberghe met Isabel Martínez, daughter of the Chilean engineer Valentín Martínez. The two married in Europe before moving to Chile in 1905. He took charge of regulatory plans for several towns around Valparaíso and Santiago before moving to Concepción. Here he worked as an engineer for the Railway Company, taking charge of the Concepción arsenal. After his retirement, he bought Lonco Valley, dedicating himself to quarry stones, wherewith he supplied the railways.

He and Isabel had four children: Lidia, Ivonne, Daniel and Enrique, who became director de obra in Concepción and was mayor of the city twice in the 1970s. Lidia married attorney and writer Jorge Labarca Moreno.
