= Sandy Campbell (actor) =

American actor and writer (1922–1988)

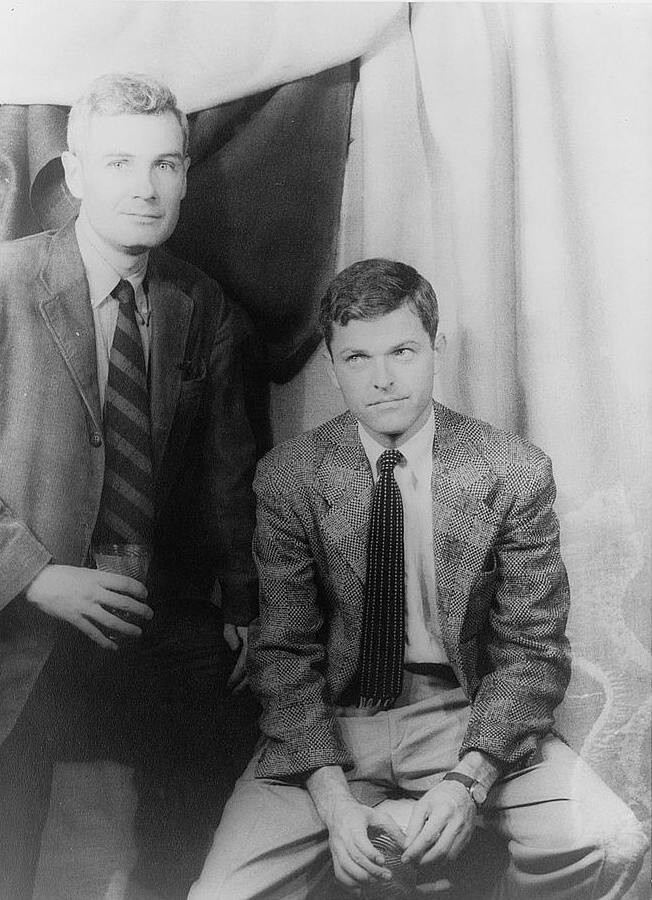
Donald Windham (l) and Sandy Campbell (r), 1955

Sandy Campbell (April 22, 1922 – June 26, 1988) was a Broadway actor, and later editor and publisher, mainly for his life-partner, Donald Windham.

== Early life ==
Sandy Campbell was born in New York City in 1922, the son of the owner of a chemical manufacturing company.

He attended Kent School, Connecticut and then studied at Princeton University.

== Career ==
After college, Sandy Campbell pursued an acting career on Broadway; he was in Life with Father, Spring Awakening, and A Streetcar Named Desire. Over more than 20 years of performing, he played alongside actors such as Marlon Brando, Spencer Tracy, Jessica Tandy, Tallulah Bankhead, Lynn Fontanne, Alfred Lunt, and Lois Smith. On the screen, he can be seen in Shades of Gray (1948), Man Against Crime (1949) and The Philco Television Playhouse (1948).

Campbell was a book collector, avid reader, and publisher. His collection includes signed first editions by Graham Greene, Vladimir Nabokov, William Faulkner, E.M. Forster, Katherine Anne Porter, Isak Dinesen, Alice B. Toklas, and Marianne Moore.

As an author, Campbell wrote biographies for Harper's Magazine; among his subjects were Nora Joyce, E.M. Forster, Lynn Fontanne, and Alfred Lunt. He also collaborated with The New Yorker as a fact checker and book reviewer. He wrote B: Twenty-Six Letters from Coconut Grove, an account of his experience playing in A Streetcar Named Desire alongside Tallulah Bankhead.

He stopped acting in the 1950s, and he devoted himself to publishing and editing Donald Windham's books through the Stamperia Valdonega in Verona, Italy.

== Personal life ==
Sandy Campbell met Donald Windham in 1943 while Campbell was modeling for painter Paul Cadmus. The relationship lasted until Campbell's death in 1988.

== Legacy ==
Campbell left his estate to Windham with the agreement that, at Windham's death, the remainder of the estate would be used to create a literary prize. The Donald Windham Sandy M. Campbell Literature Prizes was established in 2011 by Yale University.

Sandy Campbell's book collection is preserved inside the Beinecke Rare Book & Manuscript Library.
