= Pierre Herbart =

French novelist, essayist, and journalist

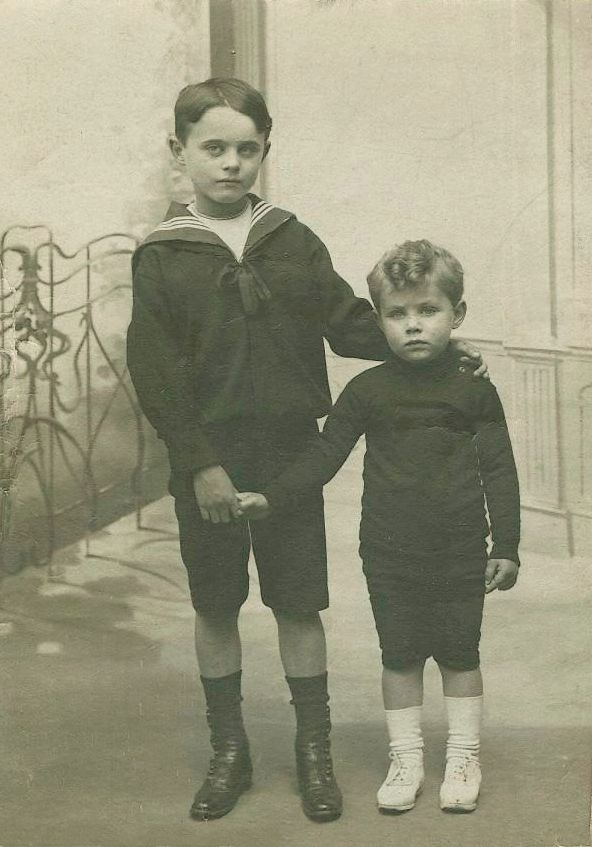
- Herbart (right) and his brother in 1906
- Born: 23 May 1903; Dunkirk, Nord, France
- Died: 2 August 1974 (aged 71); Grasse, Alpes-Maritimes, France
- Occupations: Novelist, short story writer, essayist, journalist
- Spouse: Élisabeth van Rysselberghe (m. 1931; div. 1968)

Pierre Herbart (23 May 1903 – 2 August 1974) was a French novelist, essayist, and journalist.

== Biography ==
Pierre Herbart was born in 1903 into a family of the Dunkirk bourgeoisie on the verge of being downgraded: while his grandfather Léon Herbart was director of the shipyards, the chamber of commerce, the northern railways and a shipowner, his father decided, after having spent months spending the family fortune on generous celebrations, to "be a tramp", thus plunging the family into material discomfort. Pierre was then five years old. Reappearing from time to time (before being found dead in a ditch) this improbable father (he was not his biological father), left a deep mark in the young Herbart.

The young Pierre Herbart grew up in Malo-les-Bains and attended the Jean-Bart college where he was a good student.

In 1920, at the age of seventeen, recommended by his grandfather, Herbart landed a job in an electricity company, Thomson Houston, in Paris. He stayed there for two years before being incorporated, number 1816, into Lyautey's troops in Morocco in 1923.

In 1924 he finally met Jean Cocteau, whom he greatly admired. They were introduced by Raoul Leven. They were very close until his meeting with André Gide, by chance in May 1929: in Roquebrune where he was invited by Jean Cocteau and Jean Desbordes in a house loaned by Coco Chanel.

On 15 September 1931, Herbart married Élisabeth van Rysselberghe (from whom Gide had had a daughter, Catherine, in 1923) in Lavandou. She was the daughter of his friends, the painter Théo van Rysselberghe and his wife Maria (nicknamed the "Little Lady"). Elisabeth was thirteen years his senior. André Gide took care of the publication of his first novel, Le Rôdeur (written in the summer of 1929) at Gallimard, while the couple moved to Cabris.

His stance against colonialism attracted him the sympathy of the French Communists that he joined within the PCF. In 1933 he was sent to Spain for a report by L'Humanité. On his return, he finished writing Contre-ordre and signed a contract with Gallimard, submitting his manuscript on 14 December. He left from London for Leningrad, in the USSR on 6 December 1935. He took over from Paul Nizan at the head of Littérature Internationale.

When World War II broke out, Herbart helped organize a committee formed for passive defense work (digging trenches, shelters, etc.). In 1943, under the name of General Le Vigan, he participated in the establishment of a network in the southwest of France, which helped young men to flee the STO (Service du Travail Obligatoire) and, member of the Resistance Defense network of France, he participated in the creation of the eponymous newspaper Défense de la France, which would become France-Soir. Finally, following the arrest and the execution of the person in charge for the movement in Brittany, Maurice Prestant, he was put in charge in 1944 with the regional direction. Having been appointed vice-president of the city liberation committee, he organized the liberation of Rennes (he obtained from the Americans the cessation of unnecessary bombardments on the city), arrested the prefect in place, installed his successor and the Commissioner of the Republic, and was responsible for preventing abuses and the settling of accounts.

At the Liberation, Albert Camus invited him to participate in Combat. At the same time, he completed the writing of Alcyon (1945), and helped Camus write a first screenplay for The Plague. He participated in the creation of a weekly, with Claude Bourdet and Jacques Baumel of the magazine Terre des Hommes in which Gide, Henri Calet, Raymond Aron, Prévert, Nadeau, Jean-Pierre Giraudoux, and Henri Michaux participated, but whose publication was stopped after twenty-three numbers. He also collaborated in the writing of different screenplays (Isabelle by André Gide, The Thibaults by Roger Martin du Gard).

From 13 December 1946 to 26 April 1947, he was sent to Algeria for a report on North Africa's Maghreb, whose first article made the front page of France-Soir in 1947 under the title S.O.S. Afrique du Nord. There was a second article as well as a third which was not published.

On 19 November 1949, Herbart's brother died of tetanus, followed in 1951 by André Gide. He thus lost, in two years, two relatives as well as two financial supporters. For Gallimard, he wrote a small vitriolic portrait of André Gide, À la recherche d’André Gide, published in 1952, and which would attract the wrath of admirers and certain close friends of Gide, to whom he was "related" by his union with Élisabeth van Rysselberghe. He moved to Roger Martin du Gard in Tertre and wrote L’Âge d’or, a novel in which he evoked the (mostly homosexual) loves of his youth.

In 1953, his mother died of cancer. He made several trips with his wife and wrote a book on his political career, La Ligne de force (which would be released in 1958). The same year, Roger Martin du Gard died. Gallimard instructed him to put the deceased's papers in order with a view to publication, without this succeeding. He was still financially supported by Christiane Martin du Gard, who lodged him in an apartment in rue du Dragon when he had to leave André Gide's old apartment, on rue Vaneau, when he separated from his wife in 1959 (they divorced in 1968).

Finishing off a screenplay of Alcyon, he then began writing a new novel, La Licorne, which appeared in 1964. He occasionally contributed to various literary reviews and published, in 1968, Souvenirs imaginaires; then a collection of short stories, Histoires confidential, in 1970.

Weakened, in a more than precarious financial situation, he was the victim of an attack of hemiplegia and died in Grasse on 8 in August 1974. First buried in the mass grave, he was eventually buried in Cabris.

== Homages ==
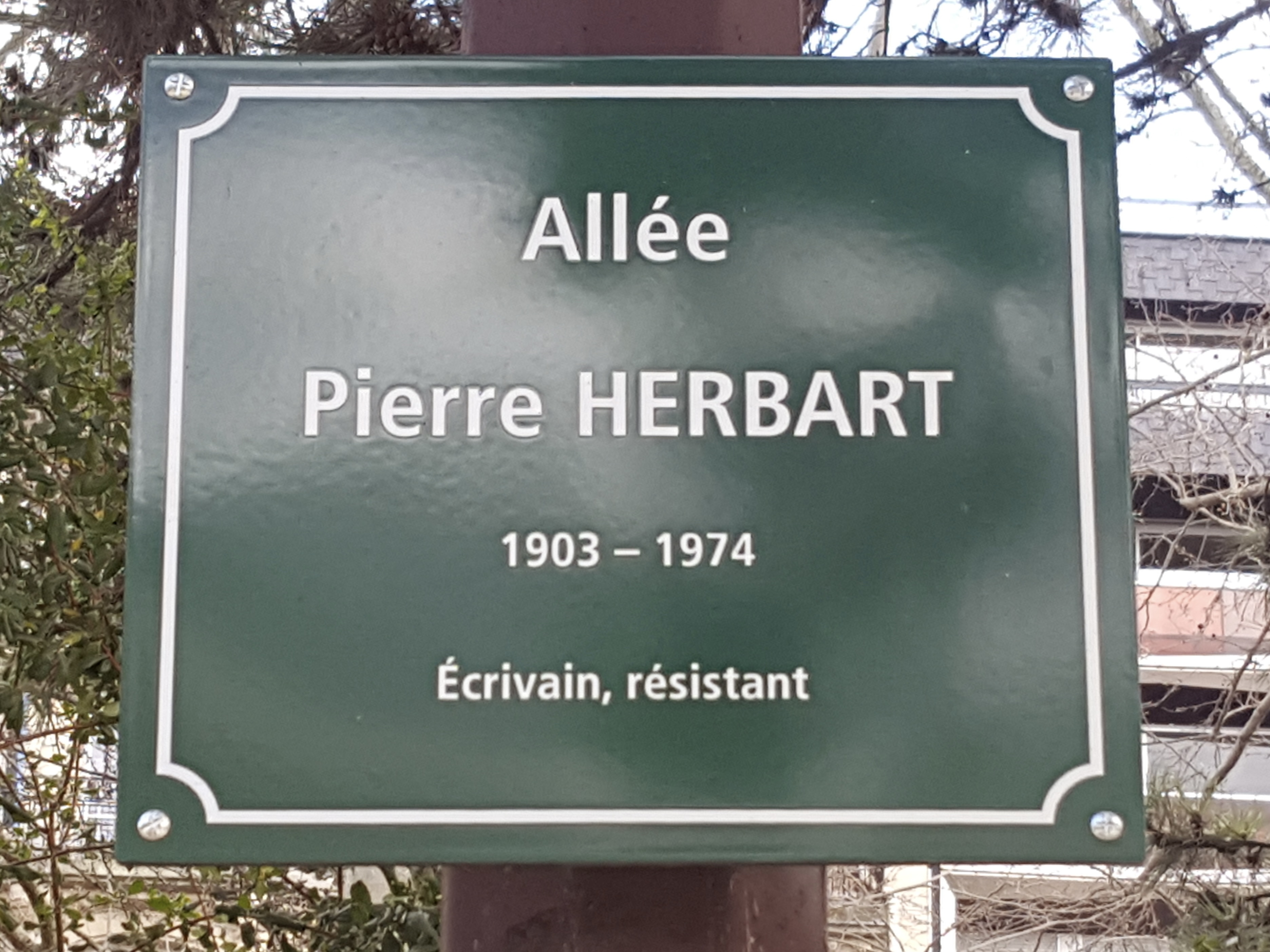
Plaque of Allée Pierre-Herbart in Paris

Allée Pierre-Herbart in the 7th arrondissement of Paris, the district in which the writer resided, is named after him. This alley is the central artery of Square Boucicaut, near Le Bon Marché, in proximity of his Parisian home.

== Work ==
=== Novels ===
- Le Rôdeur, Paris, Gallimard, 1931
- Contre-ordre, Paris, Gallimard, 1935
- Alcyon, Paris, Gallimard, 1945
- L’Âge d’or, Paris, Gallimard, 1953
- La Licorne, Paris, Gallimard, 1964

=== Collections of short stories ===
- Souvenirs imaginaires, Paris, Gallimard, 1968
- Histoires confidentielles, Paris, Grasset, 1970, re-edited 2014

=== Essays ===
- Le Chancre du Niger, Paris, Gallimard, 1939
- À la recherche d’André Gide, Paris, Gallimard, 1952
- Textes retrouvés, Paris, Le Promeneur, 1999 (published under the title Inédits with Tout sur le tout, 1981)
- On demande des déclassés, Paris, Le Promeneur, 2000

=== Memoirs ===
- En U.R.S.S., 1936, Paris, Gallimard, 1937
- La Ligne de force, Paris, Gallimard, 1958

=== Journalism ===
- Collaboration with Marianne
- Collaboration with Vendredi
- Collaboration with Terre des Hommes
- Collaboration with Combat between 1947 and 1948

== Bibliography ==
- Patrick Mauriès, preface of Souvenirs imaginaires, Paris, Le Promeneur, 1998
- Paul Renard, Pierre Herbart, romancier, autobiographe et journaliste, Roman 20 - 50, Special issue n° 3, 2006, 90 p.
- Philippe Berthier, Pierre Herbart, morale et style de la désinvolture, Centre d’études gidiennes, 1998.
- Sylvie Patron, « Pierre Herbart ou la vie ironique », Critique, n° 624, May 1999.
- Bernard Desportes, « L'Insouci de soi », Ralentir travaux, n° 12, November 1998, p. 35-39.
- Maurice Nadeau, « Une certaine attitude », Ralentir travaux, n° 12, November 1998, p. 51-54.
- —, « Herbart à Combat et beaucoup plus tard », Ralentir travaux, n° 12, November 1998, p. 55-58.
- Béatrix Beck, « Le charmeur charmé », Ralentir travaux, n° 12, November 1998, p. 59-60.
- Jean-Luc Moreau, « Le goût, amer, de l'éternel », Ralentir travaux, n° 12, November 1998, p. 67-80.
- Henri Thomas, « Le goût de l'éternel », novel (in which Pierre Herbart is one of the characters) Paris, Gallimard, 1990
- Hervé Ferrage, Henri Thomas et ses contemporains, in : Patrice Bougon & Marc Dambre, Henri Thomas, l'écriture du secret, Seyssel, Champ Vallon, 2007
- Christophe Caulier, Littérature et engagement : quelle articulation ? (André Gide, Pierre Herbart et Paul Nizan), doctoral thesis defended at Paris-Diderot, December 2008
- Pierre Lecœur, « Libération de l'autre, libération de soi, la question coloniale dans l’œuvre de Pierre Herbart », Aden, n°8, October 2009
- Jean-Luc Moreau, Pierre Herbart, l'orgueil du dépouillement, Paris, Grasset, 2014 ISBN 978-2-246-73981-4
