= Émile Danco =

Belgian polar explorer

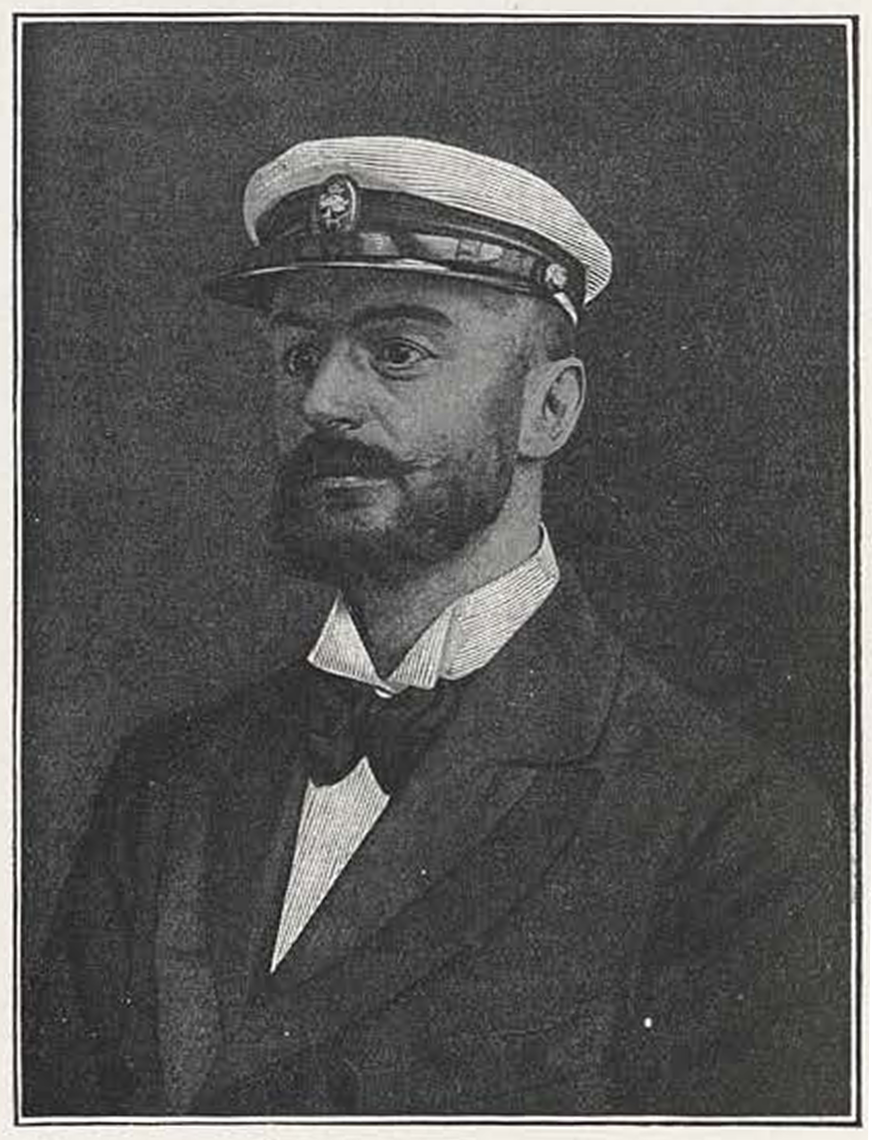
- Born: 29 November 1869; Mechelen, Belgium
- Died: 5 June 1898 (aged 28); Bellingshausen Sea, Antarctica
- Occupation: Explorer
- Known for: Belgian Antarctic Expedition

Émile Danco (27 November 1869 - 5 June 1898) was a Belgian polar explorer.

He was a lieutenant in the Belgian artillery and trained at the Royal Military Academy in Brussels, Belgium. He was a personal friend of Adrien de Gerlache de Gomery and became the first recruit for the Belgian Antarctic Expedition aboard the Belgica.

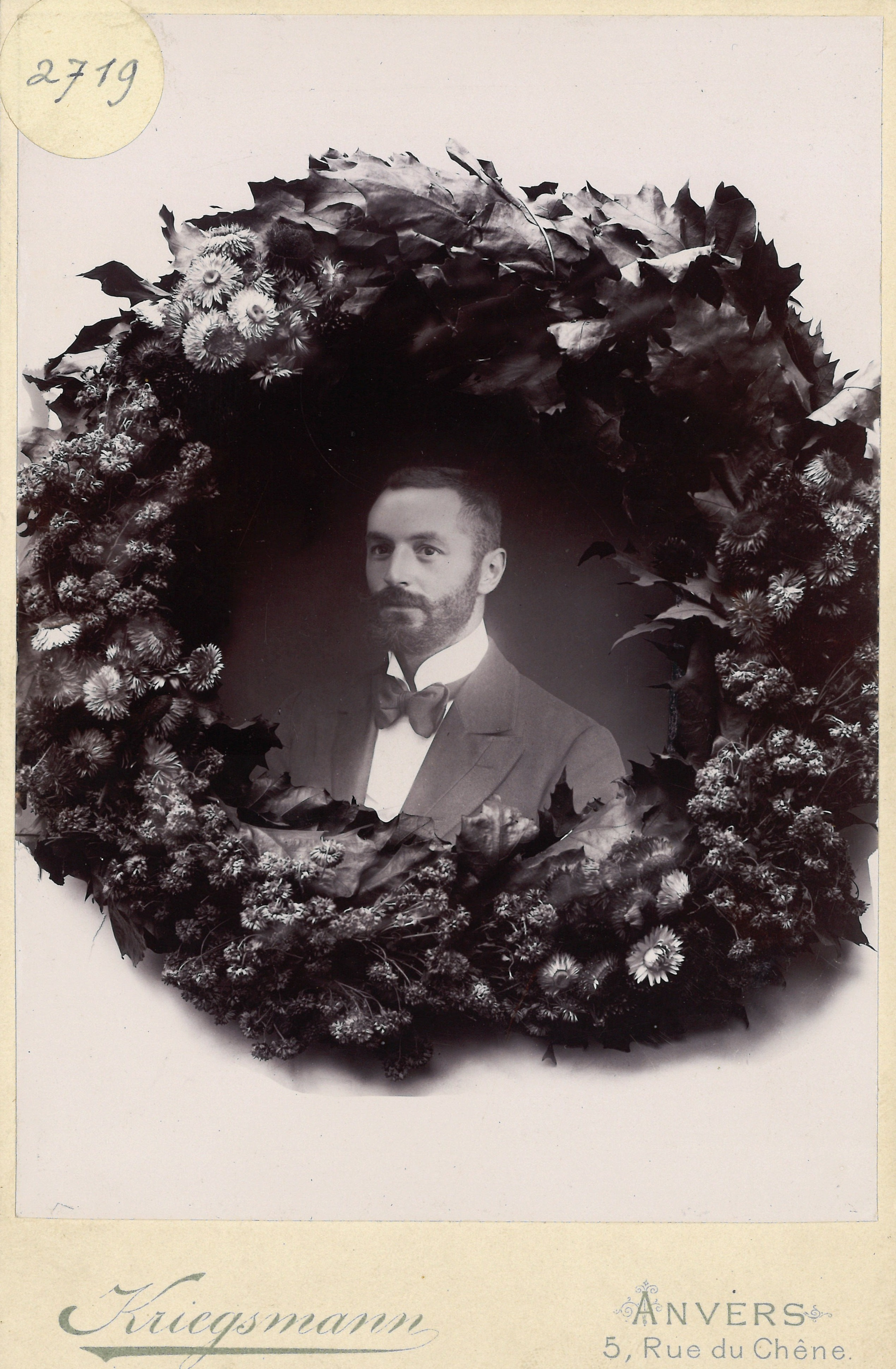
Emile Danco

Danco took part in several excursions during the first period in Antarctica, notably in early February 1898, when he joined de Gerlache, Amundsen, Cook and Arctowski on the expedition’s first camping trip, to an island west of the Antarctic Peninsula they named Brabant Island. He served as the geophysicist for the expedition, which became the first to overwinter in Antarctica. Émile Danco died of a heart condition aboard the Belgica on 5 June, 1898. His observations and work were taken up by Georges Lecointe, the Belgica's second in command.

== Honors ==
- Danco Island in the Gerlache Strait was named by Adrien de Gerlache de Gomery for Émile Danco
- The asteroid (9812) Danco was named for him
