= Emblems of Conduct =

1963 book by Donald Windham

- Author: Donald Windham
- Original title: Emblems of Conduct
- Language: English
- Genre: Autobiography
- Publisher: Scribner
- Publication date: 1963
- Publication place: United States
- Media type: Print (hardback and paperback), e-book
- Pages: 224 (paperback edition)
- ISBN: 0-820-31841-8

Emblems of Conduct is a book by American writer Donald Windham, first published in 1963. It is a personal memoir, an account of his early life in Atlanta.

== Background ==
After publishing The Hero Continues, a novel based on the life of Tennessee Williams, in 1960, Windham started publishing recollections of his childhood in Atlanta in the New Yorker. The series of recollections grew into the personal memoir Emblems of Conduct. It was first published in book form by Scribner in 1963. The book is thus an account of him growing up in the city of Atlanta, and it follows The Warm Country, a collection of stories about the same city, published in 1962.

== Plot ==
The book tells about Windham growing up in Atlanta during the Depression, as his family, which had once been prosperous, gradually becomes impoverished. The Victorian home of the family, a remainder of their prosperous past, is demolished, and young Donald keeps a piece of stained glass as a reminder of "fading grandeur". Meanwhile his mother is struggling to cope with the situation, and is forced to rely on her relatives. The book covers Windham's childhood, through his graduation from high school and his decision to move to New York City thereafter. It evokes "with faint but unmistakable nostalgia the Atlanta of the early decades of the modern century."

== Reception ==
Emblems of Conduct is a highly-regarded personal memoir by Windham. The book was warmly received. The success of this work allowed Windham to publish the collection of short stories The Warm Country.
