= Enrique van Rysselberghe Varela =

Chilean politician

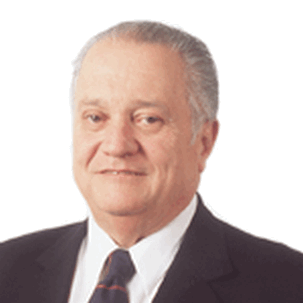
- Van Rysselberghe in 2002

Member of the Chamber of Deputies of Chile
- In office 11 March 1998 – 11 March 2002
- Preceded by: José Antonio Viera-Gallo
- Succeeded by: Andrés Egaña
- Constituency: 44th District

Personal details
- Born: 4 April 1937 Concepción, Chile
- Died: 21 January 2013 (aged 75) Campanario, Chile
- Party: Unión Demócrata Independiente
- Spouse: Maria Norma Herrera Caire
- Children: 5, including Jacqueline and Enrique
- Parent(s): Enrique van Rysselberghe Martínez; Julieta Varela Santa María
- Education: Pontifical Catholic University of Chile
- Occupation: Politician
- Profession: Architect

Enrique van Rysselberghe Varela (Note: Spanish: [enˈrike βan riselˈβeɾɣe βaˈɾela], Dutch: [ɛnˈrikə vɑn ˈrɛisəlˌbɛrɣə vaːˈrɛlaː].) (4 April 1937 – 21 January 2013) was a Chilean architect, businessman and right-wing politician. He was deputy for his hometown between 1998 and 2002.

== Biography ==
He was the son of Enrique van Rysselberghe Martínez, mayor of Concepción in the 1970s and a descendant of François van Rysselberghe, and of Julieta Varela Santa María, descendant of President Domingo Santa María (1881–1886). He studied architecture at the Catholic University and later created several companies, including Arenas Bío-Bío.

A Pinochetist like his father, he joined the conservative Independent Democratic Union (UDI), becoming regional president.

At the end of 1997, he was elected deputy for the 44th District (Concepción, San Pedro de la Paz and Chiguayante), in the central-southern area of the country. In the Chamber he was part of the Public Works, Transport and Telecommunications commissions, and the Human Rights, Nationality and Citizenship commissions.

He married María Norma Herrera Caire, with whom he had five children: Jacqueline (senator for the 12th District, Biobío Costa, intendant of the Biobío Region, mayor of Concepción), Michelle, Karen, Enrique (councilor for Concepción, deputy for the 44th District and senator for Biobío) and Cristián.

He was in charge of the Vivienda de Cáritas Chile (INVICA) for the south central area in the 1960s.

In his capacity as owner of the Empresa Constructora Rysselberghe y Cia. Ltda, he had a debt with CORFO for the non-payment of a mortgage and a debt with the municipality of Concepción for the extraction and commercialization of aggregates without a patent, because of which he faced a lawsuit in 2000 filed by the municipality, which was nullified after his daughter Jacqueline was elected mayor. These problems caused his withdrawal from politics.

He died in a car accident at kilometer 20 of Route Q-57, which connects the towns of Cabrero and Yungay, in the center-south area, on 21 January 2013, at the age of 75. He was buried on 23 January in the Cementerio General de Concepción.
