= Enrique van Rysselberghe Herrera =

Chilean politician

Enrique van Rysselberghe
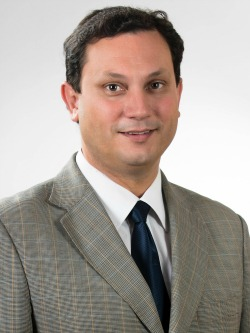
- Van Rysselberghe in 2018

Member of the Senate
- Incumbent
- Assumed office 11 March 2022
- Preceded by: Creation of the district
- Constituency: 10th Circumscription

Member of the Chamber of Deputies
- In office 11 March 2018 – 11 March 2022
- Preceded by: Creation of the district
- Constituency: District 20
- In office 11 March 2010 – 11 March 2018
- Preceded by: Andrés Egaña
- Succeeded by: Dissolution of the district
- Constituency: 44th District

Personal details
- Born: 17 November 1976 (age 49) Concepción, Chile
- Party: Unión Demócrata Independiente
- Spouse: Valentina Verónica Troncoso Sepúlveda
- Parent(s): María Norma Herrera Caire; Enrique van Rysselberghe Varela
- Education: University for Development
- Occupation: Politician
- Profession: Engineer

Enrique van Rysselberghe Herrera (born 17 September 1976) is a Chilean politician and engineer.

He is a member of the Independent Democratic Union (UDI) and currently serves as deputy for District 20 (2018–2022 term). He is the son of deputy Enrique van Rysselberghe Varela and brother of the former mayor, councilor, intendant and senator Jacqueline van Rysselberghe.

From 2010 to 2018, he served as deputy for the former 44th district for two consecutive terms. Previously, he was a councilor for the commune of Concepción between 2008 and 2009. In 2021 he was elected senator for Biobío.

Since 1997, Van Rysselberghe has maintained active participation in the Catholic Church and in the Schoenstatt Movement.

== Biography ==
He was born in Concepción on 17 September 1976, the son of Enrique van Rysselberghe Varela and María Norma Herrera Caire.

He is the brother of Senator Jacqueline van Rysselberghe and the grandson of Enrique van Rysselberghe Martínez, who served as mayor of Concepción during the periods 1971–1972 and 1975–1979. He is married to Valentina Troncoso.

Van Rysselberghe completed his primary and secondary education at the Alianza Francesa School of Concepción, graduating in 1994. In 1995, he entered the Universidad del Desarrollo in Concepción, graduating in 2000 with a degree in business engineering (ingeniería comercial).

In 2003, he obtained a Master of Business Administration (MBA) from the same university. In 2004, he completed a Post-MBA program in Marketing and Leadership at the Kellogg School of Management of Northwestern University in the United States. In December 2009, he earned a Master’s degree in Humanities from the Universidad del Desarrollo.

== Professional career ==
In 1999, after organizing the first summer social work programs of the Universidad del Desarrollo, Van Rysselberghe was appointed general head of the university’s Summer Social Work initiatives.

From 2001 onward, he has carried out both managerial and teaching duties at the Universidad del Desarrollo. Between 2001 and 2009, he directed the International PAEX Business Network of the Faculty of Economics and Business of the same university. He also served as professor and director of Business Relations at the Instituto Profesional Providencia in Concepción.

== Political career ==
Van Rysselberghe began his political career in 2004, when he was elected as a municipal councillor (concejal) of the Municipality of Concepción for the term 2004–2008.

In the 2008 municipal elections, he was re-elected councillor for the term 2008–2012. However, he resigned shortly after assuming office in order to run for the Chamber of Deputies of Chile in the 2009 parliamentary elections.

In 2009, he was elected deputy representing the Independent Democratic Union for District No. 44, comprising the communes of Concepción, Chiguayante, and San Pedro de la Paz, in the Biobío Region, serving for the legislative period 2010–2014. He was re-elected in the 2013 parliamentary elections for the same district, and again in 2017 representing the 20th District of the Biobío Region.

In August 2021, Van Rysselberghe registered his candidacy for the Senate of Chile representing the Independent Democratic Union within the Chile Podemos Más coalition, for the 10th Senatorial District of the Biobío Region (term 2022–2030). In November 2021, he was elected with 35,573 votes, corresponding to 6.48% of the valid votes cast.

== Honors and distinctions ==
During his adolescence, Van Rysselberghe was a distinguished athlete. In 1983, he was named “Exemplary Athlete” by the Integrated Sports and Cultural Association of Private Schools (ADICPA) of the Biobío Region and was pre-selected for the Chilean national basketball team by the Chilean Basketball Federation. The following year, he was recognized as “Best Athlete” of his graduating class.

In 1995, he received the Universidad Award from his university. In 2007, he was recognized as one of the “100 Young Leaders of Chile” by Sábado, the weekend magazine of El Mercurio of Santiago, and as one of the “50 Young Leaders of the Biobío Region” by El Sur newspaper of Concepción.
