= Donald Windham =

American writer (1920–2010)

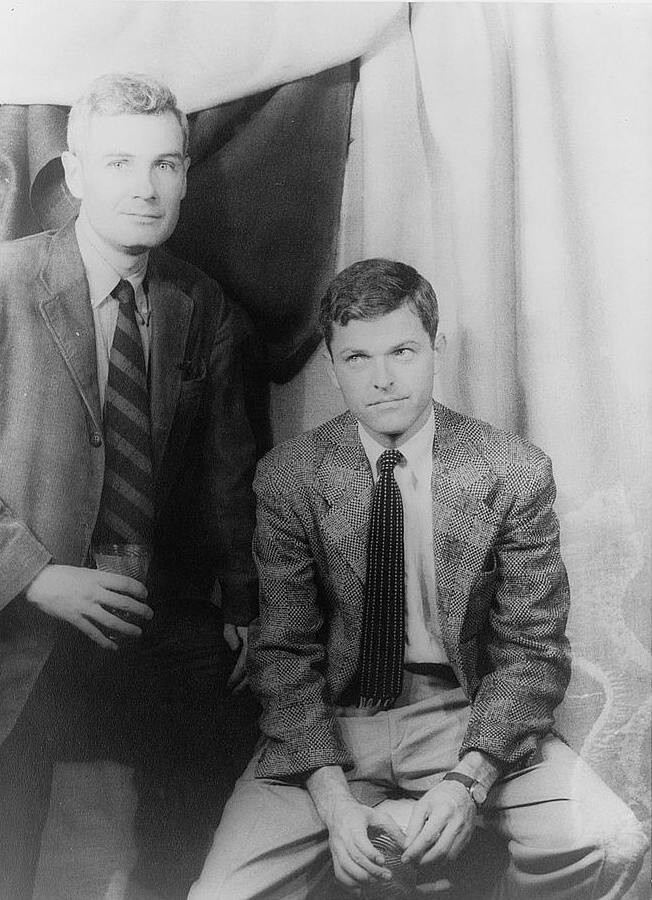
Donald Windham (l) and Sandy Campbell (r), 1955

Donald Windham (July 2, 1920 – May 31, 2010) was an American novelist and memoirist. He is perhaps best known for his close friendships with Truman Capote and Tennessee Williams. Born in Atlanta, Georgia, Windham moved with his then-boyfriend Fred Melton, an artist, to New York City in 1939. In 1942 Windham collaborated with Williams on the play, You Touched Me!, which is based on a D. H. Lawrence short story with the same title. Windham received a Guggenheim Fellowship in 1960.

Windham became estranged from Williams after Williams published his book Memoirs (1975). Windham later published a volume of their correspondence, which Williams claimed was done without his permission. Windham remained a friend of Capote until Capote's death. Windham also met and befriended such diverse figures as Lincoln Kirstein, Pavel Tchelitchew, Paul Cadmus, Gore Vidal, Christopher Isherwood and Montgomery Clift, who became a lover of Windham's during the 1940s.

In 1943, Windham met Sandy Campbell, an undergraduate student at Princeton University. In 1943 they began a relationship that would last until Campbell's death in 1988. Campbell frequently helped Windham publish books through the Stamperia Valdonega in Verona, Italy. Partially because Windham was influenced by his own life, homosexuality is one of many themes treated in his work.

Windham's novels include The Dog Star (1950), which was praised by André Gide and Thomas Mann, The Hero Continues (1960), which is likely based on Williams, Two People (1965) which is about a love affair between a New York stockbroker whose wife has left him and a 17-year-old Italian boy in Rome, and Tanaquil (1972), which is based on the life of George Platt Lynes. In the 1960s, Windham published a series of recollections about his childhood in the New Yorker. These were collected in the autobiography Emblems of Conduct, published in 1964. The book was warmly received. Lost Friendships, a memoir of his friendship with Capote and Williams, was published in 1987. It is regarded by some as his best book.

In June 2011 it was announced that Yale University would administer the Donald Windham-Sandy M. Campbell Literature Prizes.
