= Enrique van Rysselberghe Martínez =

Chilean politician (1911–1984)

Mayor of Concepción
- In office 24 April 1975 – 25 June 1979
- President: Augusto Pinochet
- Preceded by: Alfonso Urrejola Arrau
- Succeeded by: Claudio Arteaga Reyes
- In office 21 May 1971 – 11 September 1973
- Preceded by: Guillermo Aste Pérez
- Succeeded by: Alfonso Urrejola Arrau

Councilor of Concepción
- In office 1967 – 11 September 1973
- President: Augusto Pinochet
- Preceded by: Dissolution of the charge
- Succeeded by: Alfonso Urrejola Arrau

Personal details
- Born: 22 August 1911 Concepción, Chile
- Died: 30 May 1984 (aged 72) Concepción, Chile
- Party: Partido Nacional
- Spouse(s): Julieta Varela Marta Fuentes (m. 1971)
- Children: 12, including Enrique
- Parents: Max van Rysselberghe (father); Isabel Martínez (mother)
- Occupation: Politician
- Profession: Architect

Enrique van Rysselberghe Martínez (Note: Latin American Spanish: [enˈrike βan riselˈβerɣe maɾˈtines], Dutch: [ɛnˈrikə vɑn ˈrɛisəlˌbɛrɣə mɑrˈtinɛs].) (22 August 1911 – 30 May 1984) was a Chilean architect and politician, who was mayor of Concepción twice in the 1970s.

== Biography ==
=== Family ===
He was born into a family whose origins go back to the engineer Max van Rysselberghe, son of François van Rysselberghe, a Belgian citizen. At the end of the 19th century, and less than 20 years old, Max participated in an expedition from Belgium to Antarctica, the Belgian Antarctic Expedition, which was originally supposed to last six months, but ended up lasting two years.

Once back in his country, Max met Isabel Martínez, daughter of Valentín Martínez, with whom he fell in love. They married and returned to Chile in 1905. They had four children: Lidia, Ivonne, Enrique and Daniel.

Enrique married Julieta Varela Santa María, a descendant of former president Domingo Santa María (1881–1886), and they had four children: Javier, Enrique, Ivonne, and Astrid.

=== Architect ===
Van Rysselberghe learned about engineering and architecture by studying texts in his father's library and later became an architect, although he never formally studied architecture. His works were tested by the 1939 Chillán earthquake, of 8.3 degrees, which hit Concepción with force, leaving almost 90% of the houses in the city destroyed. However, none of the ones he had built collapsed, so later, for reconstruction, many sought his services. He later went to work at the Directorate of Works of the municipality. At the same time, he made his fortune with businesses related to construction: he created a machine that allowed aggregates to be removed from the banks of the Biobío even during the rainy season, which made him the only one able to supply the different construction companies with sand all year round, quickly monopolizing the entire market in the area; he also developed a machine to clean the charcoal thrown away by the Lota miners, material that he got for free or at a very low cost.

=== Political career ===
In 1967 he was elected alderman as an independent for the commune of Concepción and, as he held the position of first alderman, he had to replace the then mayor Guillermo Aste Pérez on several occasions when he had to be absent from the city. In the 1971 elections he was re-elected, this time representing the National Party. As he obtained the first majority, he became mayor, a position he held until 1974, the year in which he unsuccessfully competed in the parliamentary elections for a deputy seat.

Due to the various social works carried out during his administration, the businessman and founder of Radio Bío Bío, Nibaldo Mosciatti Moena, baptized him El realizador.

After the coup led by General Augusto Pinochet that overthrew the government of Salvador Allende in 1973, the military dictatorship appointed him mayor of Concepción, a position he held until 1979. He is remembered for his good management.
