= The Dog Star =

1950 novel by Donald Windham

- First edition (publ. Doubleday)
- Author: Donald Windham
- Language: English
- Publisher: Doubleday
- Publication date: 1950
- LC Class: PZ3.W71295 Do

The Dog Star is a novel by American writer Donald Windham, first published in 1950. It tells the story of a young Southern man who is haunted by the suicide of his best friend from reform school. Set in 1930s post-Depression Atlanta, the novel's themes include dysfunctional families, traditionalism, urban anomie, homosexuality, and suicide.

== Plot ==
In inner-city Atlanta, 15-year-old Blackie Pride is consumed by the memories of Whitey Maddox, his best friend from reform school who has recently killed himself. Despite their names, both boys are white and endured a period of homoerotic intimacy during their time at school together that may have encouraged Whitey's fatal actions. With Whitey dead, Blackie roams the streets of his poor neighborhood contemplating the feelings of worthlessness and disappointment he attributes to his family and remaining friends. With the realization of inevitable hardships overwhelming him, and the idealization of apathy plaguing any potential motivation for a better life, Blackie commits suicide.

== Reception ==
The novel was well received by Windham's contemporaries, including authors E.M. Forster, André Gide, and Albert Camus. German writer Thomas Mann called it the best American novel of the decade. Despite its critical acclaim, particularly in England, the novel found little success in the United States.
