= François van Rysselberghe =

Belgian scientist

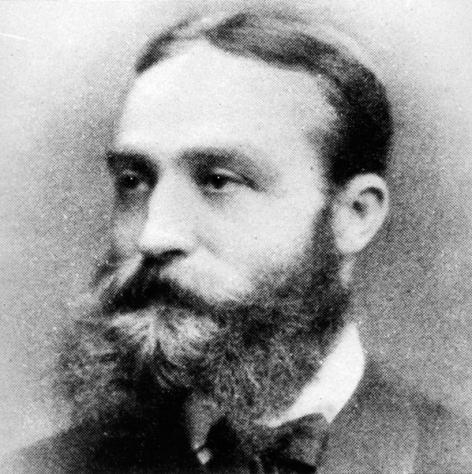
- François van Rysselberghe
- Born: François van Rysselberghe; 24 August 1846; Ghent, Belgium
- Died: 3 February 1893 (aged 46); Antwerp, Belgium
- Education: University of Liège
- Occupations: Mathematician, meteorologist, inventor

Signature
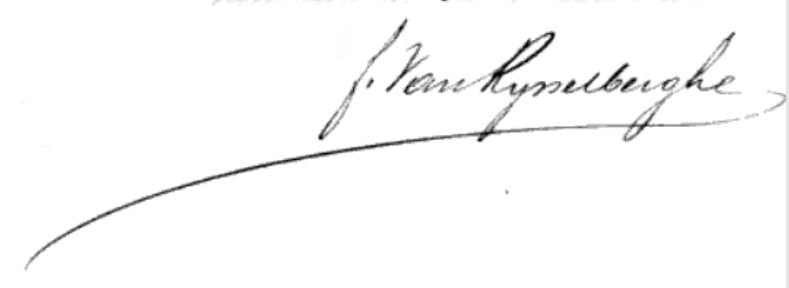

François van Rysselberghe (24 August 1846 – 3 February 1893) was a Belgian scientist who was the forerunner or the inventor of numerous devices in the fields of meteorology and telephony. He invented, in particular, a system allowing several telephone signals to pass through telegraph cables. The generalization of the Van Rysselberghe System (French: Système Van Rysselberghe) in Belgium in 1884, and then abroad, promoted the development of this new mode of communication, making it a pioneer of long-distance telephone communications.

== Biography ==
=== Early life ===
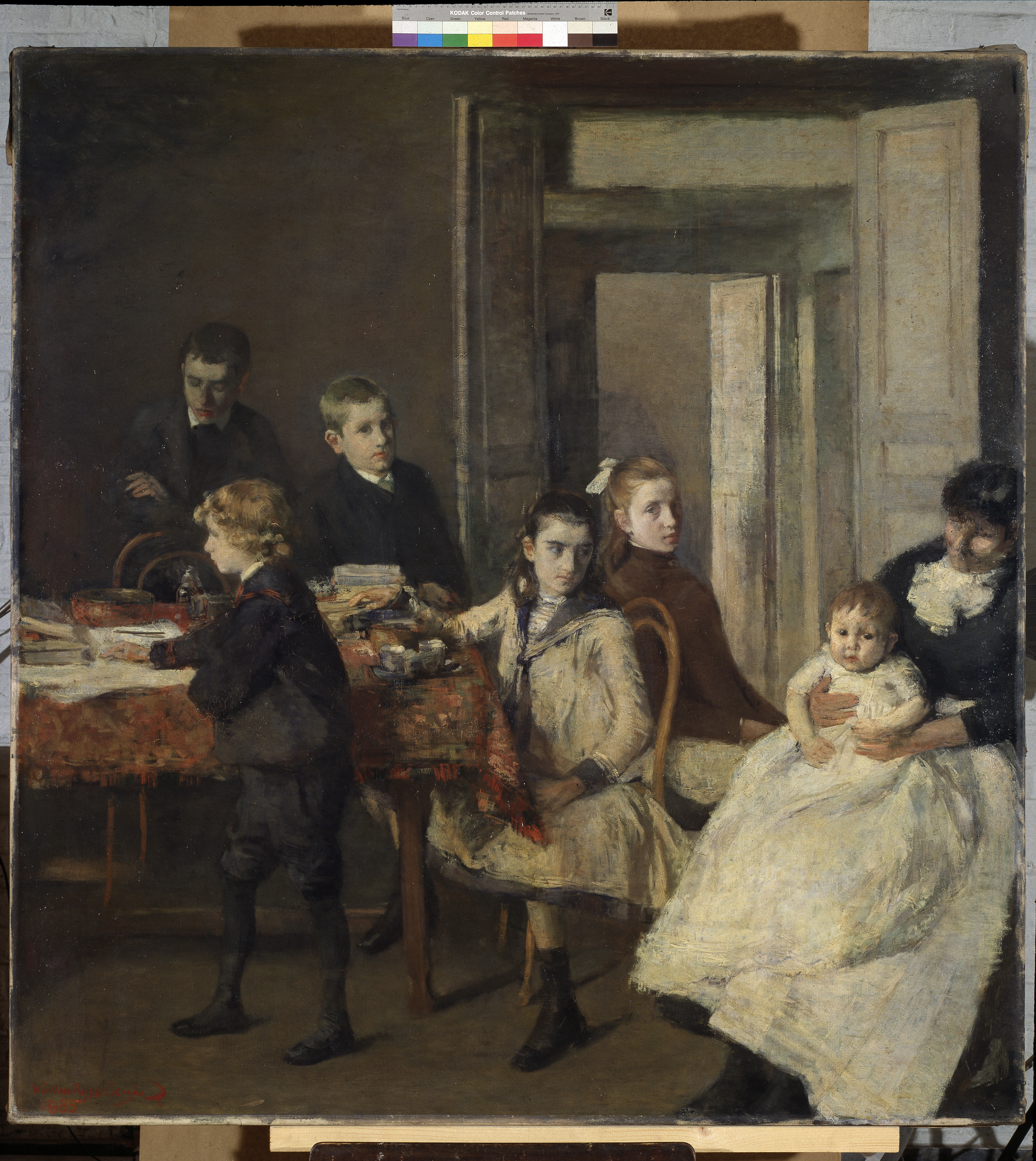
The children of François van Rysselberghe by his brother, Théo van Rysselberghe (1885)

François Van Rysselbergh was born into a modest Ghent family, his father, Jean-Baptiste Van Rysselberghe, was a carpenter, he had married another Ghent woman, Mélanie Rommens. The couple would have nine children, three of whom died at a young age. François was the eldest of the siblings. The family first settled in Turnhout, where François received his primary education. The family then returned to Ghent. After completing his secondary studies before the age of 17 at the Sint-Barbaracollege, he was forced to work to financially support his family and then accepted a post of supervisor of a boarding school, first in Ninove first and then in Tournai. He then accepted a course load in a private school in Ghent. Although his basic education was literary, he was interested in science and particularly in mathematics and physics and took courses at the industrial school. In 1865 he successfully passed an examination for the post of second professor of mathematics at the Ostend navigation school, where he gave courses in nautical astronomy and mathematics. While he was teaching there, he was a candidate in physical sciences and mathematics at the University of Liège and graduated in 1869. The same year, he married Henriette Housmans in Ostend. The couple, established in Ostend, would have seven children.

=== Meteorology ===
François Van Rysselberghe developed a passion for meteorology at that time. He soon acquired a whole arsenal of measuring devices. He then planned to invent a combined device that would automatically annotate weather data on a single metal cylinder. He designed and produced, assisted by his collaborator Théodore Schubart, a meteorograph equipped with an electro-magnetic recorder which would remain known under the name of Universal Meteorograph Van Rysselberghe and Schubart (French: Météorographe universel Van Rysselberghe et Schubart). The prototype functioned without fail for several years in the tower of the town hall of Ostend. The device was acquired by foreign meteorologists and was presented at the International Geographic Congress held in Paris in 1875, which earned it a gold medal and the academic palms.

The same year, François Van Rysselberghe joined the State hydrographic service as a sub-engineer of the Hydrographic Service of the Navy. He worked there for a while and helped to map the sandbanks of the Belgian coast and the mouths of the Scheldt. At this time, he also developed a tide gauge but in 1876, Jean-Charles Houzeau, director of the Royal Observatory of Belgium, called on him to attach him to the weather forecast service.

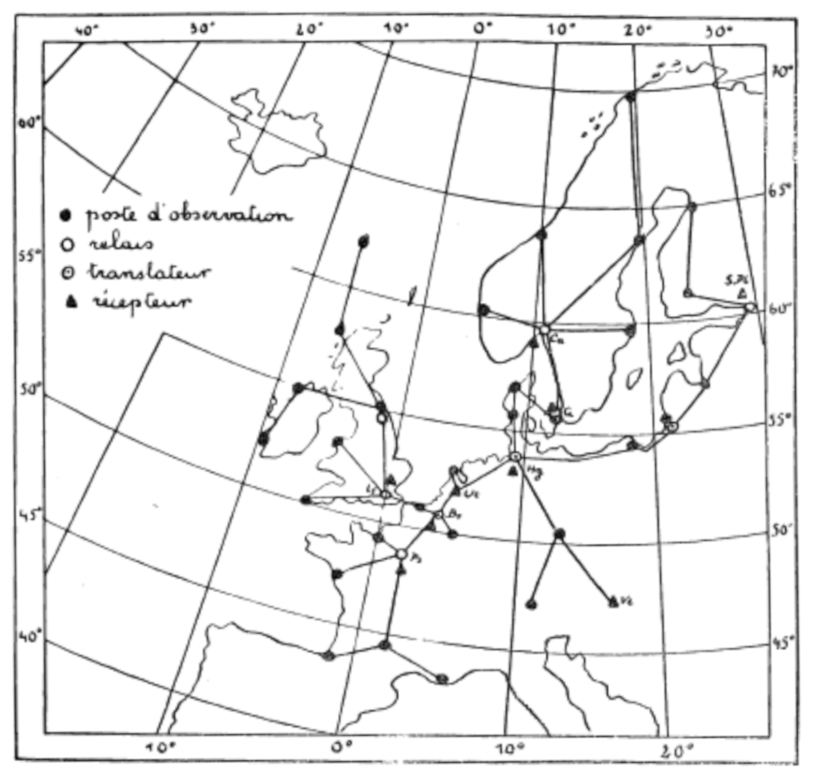
François Van Rysselberghe's international telemeteorography project (1873)

On 26 September 1876, the Observatory published the first Meteorological Bulletin in its history. François Van Rysselberghe was one of the first to observe the impact of oceanic and polar currents on climate change. He studied isallobaric routes and changes to his daily predictions, perhaps the first to have done this. He was one of the first synopticians in the same rank as Robert FitzRoy. He attacked the theories of Heinrich Wilhelm Dove of which he said: "It is important that we get rid of this conception which has not solved the problem of the storms of Europe, to adopt a theory which is better in harmony with the observation."

A great limitation of the weather models he could build was related to the fact that at that time, meteorologists could only count on a single 40-point reading in Europe and transmitted at eight in the morning local time. This only allowed for a single daily card to be drawn up at best. François Van Rysselberghe then began to think about an automatic process for transmitting data in real time, which he called international telemeteorography (French: télémétéorographie internationale). He therefore restarted his meteorographer, which soon became operational between Brussels and Ostend. In 1881, the device was at the center of a masterful demonstration in Paris, during the International Congress of Electricians which took place on the occasion of the International Exposition of Electricity when the astonished observed, engraved in Paris, the meteorological observations of Brussels.

Van Rysselberghe was always in search of the factors influencing the climatic conditions, and was then interested in the high layers of the atmosphere and planned to send there via a kite or a balloon a telemeteorograph. He also designed a network of 29 international stations interconnected with nine recording stations, making it possible to pool meteorological data instantly. These projects would only remain theoretical as his discoveries led Van Rysselberghe to tackle other related issues: long-distance telephony.

=== Telecommunications ===
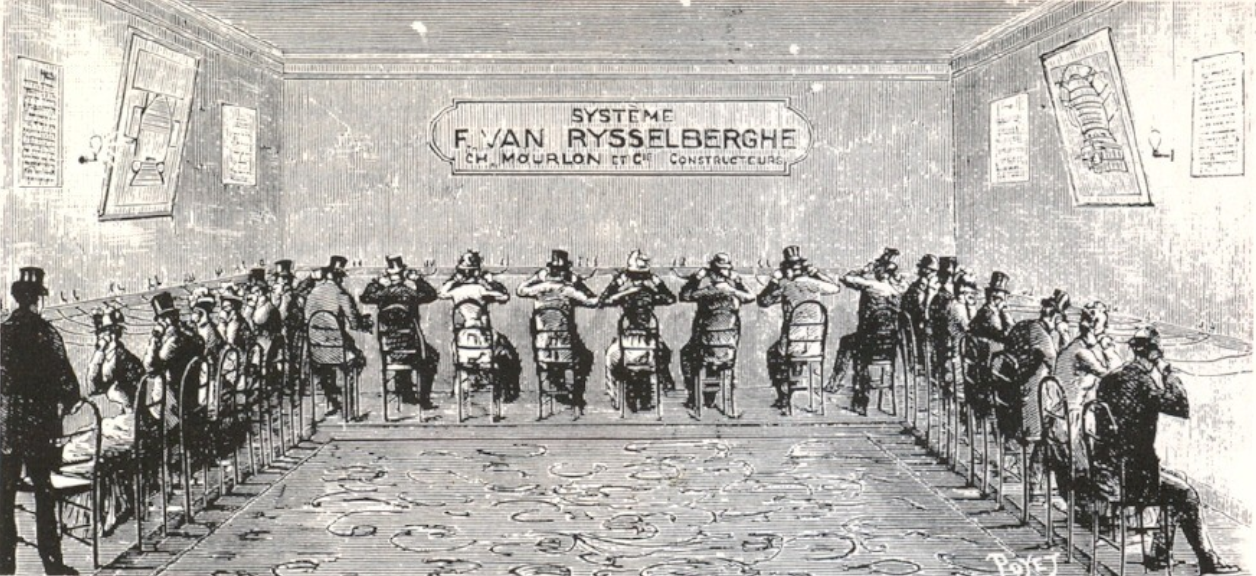
During the 1885 World's Fair in Antwerp, listeners listened to a concert taking place in Brussels using the Système Van Rysselberghe

Van Rysselberghe had difficulty contacting the operator of the telemeteorograph based in Ostend. This device was linked with that of Brussels via a dedicated telegraph cable, hence the idea which occurred to him to investigate whether the same cable could not transmit both telegraph and telephone signals. This would be at the origin of his most important contribution to the deployment of long-distance telephony by developing an anti-inductor system which made it possible to dispense with having to pull new telephone cables between two geographically distant points since the signal borrowed the existing telegraph cabling. In France, a first link was established on the basis of this process between Reims and Paris then, in 1882 between Brussels and Paris, which greatly contributed to the notoriety of the Van Rysselberghe System (French: Système Van Rysselberghe). In 1884, the entire Belgian inter-urban network thus became operational on this base.

In 1882, Van Rysselberghe accepted a course load at the special schools of the Ghent University and taught the course in the application of electricity. He then left the Royal Observatory of Belgium to turn resolutely towards telecommunications. In 1883, he designed a multiplex phonic telegraph that could simultaneously transmit up to 24 messages. The device received the full attention of the United States.

In 1884, having donated his Van Rysselberghe System to Belgium, he was appointed, as a reward, electrician-consultant to the Ministry of Railways, Posts and Telegraphs. Shortly before his untimely death, Van Rysselberghe became interested in the transport of electricity made more difficult by the fact that the current at that time was direct. He filed a patent for his transport of energy in water pipes under high pressure coupled to dynamos. The city of Antwerp gave him carte blanche to deploy his invention to power the city's public lighting and it is when he was busy with this task that he died on 3 February 1893, at the age of 46, carried away in two days by a devastating disease.

He is buried in the Schoonselhof cemetery in Antwerp.

== Family ==
Van Rysselberghe was the brother of Théo van Rysselberghe who married Maria, née Monnom. Maria was André Gide's confidante and her daughter, Elisabeth Van Rysselberghe, gave birth to a child, Catherine Gide, the author's only child, who was recognized in April 1938 after the death of Gide's wife.

== Sources ==
- Royal Academy of Science, Letters and Fine Arts of Belgium (1958–1959). "Biographie Nationale" (PDF) (in French). Bruxelles. p. 362.
- Royal Academy of Science, Letters and Fine Arts of Belgium (1908–1910). "Biographie Nationale" (PDF) (in French). Bruxelles. p. 384.
- Ciel et Terre [in French] (1893). "Francois Van Rysselberghe". Ciel et Terre (in French). 13. Société royale belge d'astronomie: 557. Bibcode:1893C&T....13..557.
- Hunaerts, J. (1939). "Comètes 1939 - Un précurseur de la météorologie dynamique - François Van Rysselberghe (1846-1893)". Ciel et Terre (in French). 55: 459. Bibcode:1939C&T....55..459H.
- Petra Gunst (2015). "Van Rysselberghe, Franciscus (1846-1893)" (in Dutch). Ghent: Ghent University.
- D. Gordon Tucker (1978). "Francois van Rysselberghe: Pioneer of Long-Distance Telephony". Technology and Culture. Vol. 19, no. 4. JSTOR. p. 650. doi:10.2307/3103763. ISSN 0040-165X. JSTOR 3103763.
- Ghent University (1913). "François Van Rysselberghe" (PDF) (in French). Ghent: Ghent University.
