= Catherine Gide =

French writer (1923–2013)

- Catherine Gide
- Born: 18 April 1923; Annecy, France
- Died: 20 April 2013 (aged 90); Olten, Switzerland
- Occupations: Writer, editor
- Spouses: Jean Lambert (m. 1946, separated) Pierre Desvignes (died 1987) Peter Schnyder (after 1987)
- Children: 4
- Parent(s): André Gide (father); Élisabeth van Rysselberghe (mother)
- Relatives: Théo van Rysselberghe (grandfather)

Catherine Gide (18 April 1923 – 20 April 2013) was a French writer and editor. She was the daughter of André Gide and Élisabeth van Rysselberghe, daughter of Théo van Rysselberghe.

== Biography ==
Catherine Gide was born in Annecy, France, on 18 April 1923. She was an illegitimate child, the natural daughter and only child of André Gide, Nobel laureate in literature, and Élisabeth van Rysselberghe (daughter of Maria and painter Théo van Rysselberghe). She was recognized by her father on the death of his wife, Madeleine, and adopted on 26 July 1938. She first married the Germanist and academic Jean Lambert (1914–1999); their son Nicolas, born in 1947, died young in a traffic accident, in 1986. They had three more children, Isabelle (born in 1945), Dominique (born in 1948), and Sophie.

Gide later remarried to Pierre Desvignes. After his death she married the academic Peter Schnyder, a specialist in André Gide and his entourage.

In 2009 she published the collection of interviews Entretiens 2002–2003. With this publication, Gide shared for the first time personal memories about her childhood, while the public was presented with information about André Gide's role as father, which before the release of this work had been scarcely documented in secondary literature. Gide also edited, among others, Lettres à la Petite Dame : un petit à la campagne, juin 1924 – décembre 1926, published by Éditions Gallimard in 2000.

Gide lived for a long time in Cabris (Maritime Alps) in her vacation home.

The Fondation Catherine Gide was created in 2007 at her initiative. It is headquartered in Switzerland. Its purpose is to "keep the memory of André Gide and of his time alive", fostering the "literary and cultural heritage of the author". In 2019 the foundation organized an exhibition in Paris on the occasion of the 150th anniversary of the birth of André Gide together with the Gallimard Gallery of Paris, the Fondation des Treilles, and the Musée Georges-Borias d’Uzès.

Gide died on 20 April 2013 in Olten (German-speaking Switzerland), at the age of 90.

== Bibliography ==
- Élisabeth Van Rysselberghe, Lettres à la Petite Dame : un petit à la campagne, juin 1924 – décembre 1926, texts chosen and presented by Catherine Gide, Gallimard, 2000 ISBN 2-07-075912-1
- Théo Van Rysselberghe intime, exposition, Le Lavandou, Espace culturel, 8 July – 18 September 2005, catalogue : Catherine Gide, Raphaël Dupouy, Jean-Paul Monery, Peter Schnyder ISBN 2-9518939-4-9
- André Gide, Le Ramier, foreword by Catherine Gide, preface by Jean-Claude Perrier, afterword by David H. Walker, Gallimard, 2002
- Maria van Rysselberghe, "L'Enfant Catherine", La Nouvelle Revue française, No. 580, January 2007, pp. 108–130
- Théo Van Rysselberghe, Catherine Gide, Théo Van Rysselberghe intime, Réseau Lalan, 2002, ISBN 978-2-95-189394-8
- Catherine Gide, Entretiens 2002–2003, Gallimard, 2009 ISBN 978-2-07-012033-8
