= Bjørnskinn Municipality =

Former municipality in Nordland, Norway

Bjørnskinn Municipality Bjørnskinn herred
- Former municipality
- Bjørnskind herred (historic name)
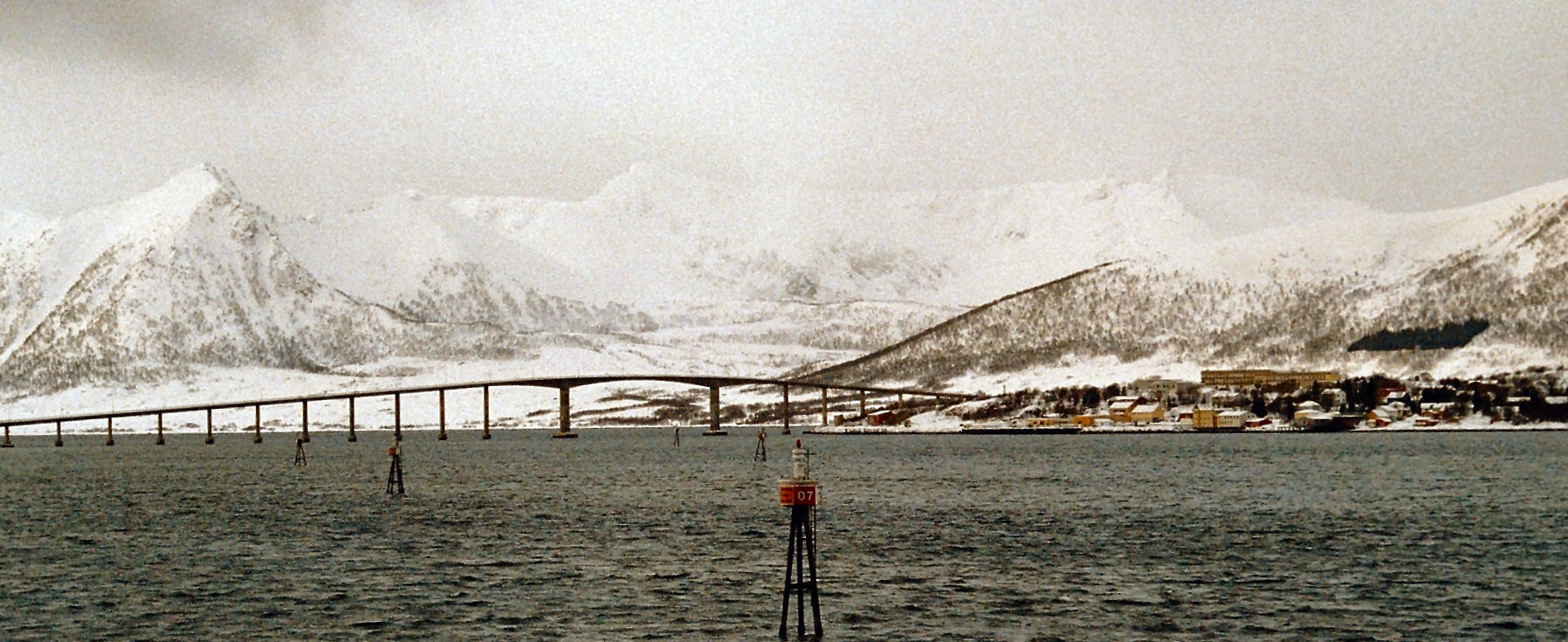
- View of Risøyhamn

- Nordland within Norway

- Bjørnskinn within Nordland
- Coordinates: 69.0001°N 15.6330°E
- Country: Norway
- County: Nordland
- District: Vesterålen
- Established: 1 Jan 1924
  - Preceded by: Dverberg Municipality
- Disestablished: 1 Jan 1964
  - Succeeded by: Andøy Municipality
- Administrative centre: Bjørnskinn

Area (upon dissolution)
  - Total: 309.9 km^{2} (119.7 sq mi)
  - Rank: #278 in Norway
- Highest elevation: 889.18 m (2,917.3 ft)

Population (1963)
  - Total: 1,846
  - Rank: #463 in Norway
  - Density: 6/km^{2} (16/sq mi)
  - Change (10 years): ▼ −6%
- Demonym: Bjørnskinn-folk

Official language
  - Norwegian form: Bokmål
- Time zone: UTC+01:00 (CET)
  - Summer (DST): UTC+02:00 (CEST)
- ISO 3166 code: NO-1871

Bjørnskinn is a former municipality in Nordland county, Norway. The 310-square-kilometre (120 sq mi) municipality existed from 1924 until its dissolution in 1964. The municipality was centered around the Risøysundet strait. It encompassed the southern part of the island of Andøya and the northern part of the island of Hinnøya in the southern part of what is now Andøy Municipality. The administrative centre was the small village of Bjørnskinn where Bjørnskinn Church is located. The largest village in Bjørnskinn was the village of Risøyhamn.

Prior to its dissolution in 1964, the 310-square-kilometre (120 sq mi) municipality was the 278th largest by area out of the 689 municipalities in Norway. Bjørnskinn Municipality was the 463rd-most-populous municipality in Norway with a population of about 1,846. The municipality's population density was 6 inhabitants per square kilometre (16/sq mi) and its population had decreased by 6% over the previous 10-year period.

== General information ==
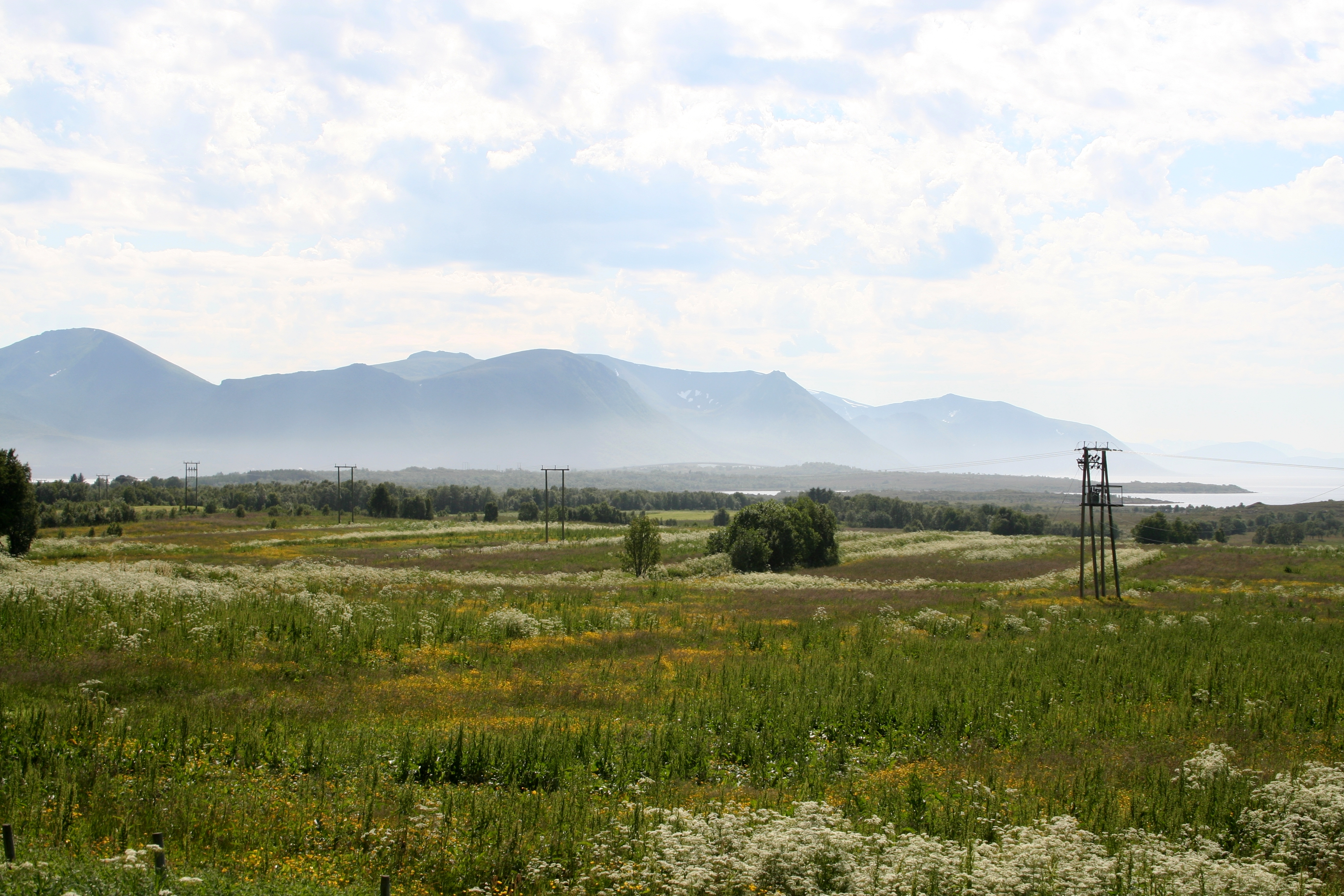
View from Bjørnskinn towards Risøyhamn

The municipality of Andenes was established on 1 January 1924 when Dverberg Municipality was divided into three: Andenes Municipality (population: 2,213) in the north, Bjørnskinn Municipality (population: 1,410) in the south, and Dverberg Municipality (population: 1,477) in the central part of the old municipality. During the 1960s, there were many municipal mergers across Norway due to the work of the Schei Committee. On 1 January 1964, Bjørnskinn Municipality (population: 1,835) was merged (back) with the neighboring Dverberg Municipality (population: 1,719) and Andenes Municipality (population: 3,812) to create the new Andøy Municipality.

=== Name ===
The municipality is named after the old Bjørnskinn farm (Old Norse: Bjarnskinn) since the first Bjørnskinn Church was built there. The meaning of the name is uncertain, but it is possible that the first element comes from the genitive case of the word bjǫrn which means "bear". The last element is skinn which means "skin" or "covering". In the 1400s, the name was spelled Bjarnaska which could be similar to a meaning such as "bear danger". Historically, the name of the municipality was spelled Bjørnskind. On 6 January 1908, a royal resolution changed the spelling of the name of the municipality to Bjørnskinn.

=== Churches ===
The Church of Norway had one parish (sokn) within Bjørnskinn Municipality. At the time of the municipal dissolution, it was part of the Dverberg prestegjeld and the Vesterålen prosti (deanery) in the Diocese of Sør-Hålogaland.

Churches in Bjørnskinn Municipality
| Parish (sokn) | Church name | Location of the church | Year built |
|---|---|---|---|
| Bjørnskinn | Bjørnskinn Church | Bjørnskinn | 1855 |

== Geography ==
The highest point in the municipality is the 889.18-metre (2,917.3 ft) tall mountain Skrivartinden. The municipality was located at the south end of the island of Andøya and the northwest end of the island of Hinnøya. Dverberg Municipality was located to the north and Sortland Municipality was located to the south. The Gavlfjorden was located to the west, the Forfjorden was located to the south, and the Risøysundet strait went through the middle of the municipality.

== Government ==
While it existed, Bjørnskinn Municipality was responsible for primary education (through 10th grade), outpatient health services, senior citizen services, welfare and other social services, zoning, economic development, and municipal roads and utilities. The municipality was governed by a municipal council of directly elected representatives. The mayor was indirectly elected by a vote of the municipal council. The municipality was under the jurisdiction of the Hålogaland Court of Appeal.

=== Municipal council ===
The municipal council (Herredsstyre) of Bjørnskinn Municipality was made up of 13 representatives that were elected to four-year terms. The tables below show the historical composition of the council by political party.

Bjørnskinn herredsstyre 1959–1963
| Party name (in Norwegian) | Number of representatives |
|---|---|
| Labour Party (Arbeiderpartiet) | 8 |
| Conservative Party (Høyre) | 1 |
| Christian Democratic Party (Kristelig Folkeparti) | 1 |
| Joint List(s) of Non-Socialist Parties (Borgerlige Felleslister) | 3 |
| Total number of members: | 13 |
Note: This municipality became part of the new Andøy Municipality on 1 January 1964.

Bjørnskinn herredsstyre 1955–1959
| Party name (in Norwegian) | Number of representatives |
|---|---|
| Labour Party (Arbeiderpartiet) | 8 |
| Liberal Party (Venstre) | 3 |
| Joint List(s) of Non-Socialist Parties (Borgerlige Felleslister) | 2 |
| Total number of members: | 13 |

Bjørnskinn herredsstyre 1951–1955
| Party name (in Norwegian) | Number of representatives |
|---|---|
| Labour Party (Arbeiderpartiet) | 7 |
| Liberal Party (Venstre) | 3 |
| Joint List(s) of Non-Socialist Parties (Borgerlige Felleslister) | 2 |
| Total number of members: | 12 |

Bjørnskinn herredsstyre 1947–1951
| Party name (in Norwegian) | Number of representatives |
|---|---|
| Labour Party (Arbeiderpartiet) | 7 |
| Liberal Party (Venstre) | 3 |
| Joint List(s) of Non-Socialist Parties (Borgerlige Felleslister) | 1 |
| Local List(s) (Lokale lister) | 1 |
| Total number of members: | 12 |

Bjørnskinn herredsstyre 1945–1947
| Party name (in Norwegian) | Number of representatives |
|---|---|
| Labour Party (Arbeiderpartiet) | 7 |
| List of workers, fishermen, and small farmholders (Arbeidere, fiskere, småbrukere liste) | 1 |
| Joint List(s) of Non-Socialist Parties (Borgerlige Felleslister) | 4 |
| Total number of members: | 12 |

Bjørnskinn herredsstyre 1937–1941*
| Party name (in Norwegian) | Number of representatives |
|---|---|
| Labour Party (Arbeiderpartiet) | 5 |
| Joint List(s) of Non-Socialist Parties (Borgerlige Felleslister) | 7 |
| Total number of members: | 12 |
Note: Due to the German occupation of Norway during World War II, no elections were held for new municipal councils until after the war ended in 1945.

=== Mayors ===
The mayor (Norwegian: ordfører) of Bjørnskinn Municipality was the political leader of the municipality and the chairperson of the municipal council. Here is a list of people who held this position:

- 1924–1934: Trygve Pettersen
- 1935–1940: Isak Rikard Nikolai Andreassen
- 1946–1963: Anton P. Medby

== Notable people ==
- Helmer Hanssen (1870–1956), a polar explorer who was on the expedition of Roald Amundsen to the South Pole
- Johan Kleppe, a member of Norwegian Parliament from Nordland (1969–1973) and defense minister in Korvald's Cabinet (1972–1973)
- Augustinus Johannessøn Sellevold (1803–1893), a fisherman-farmer who was twice elected as member of the Norwegian Parliament from Nordland (1845–1848)

== See also ==
- List of former municipalities of Norway
