= Åse, Nordland =

Village in Andøy Municipality, Norway

Åse
- Village
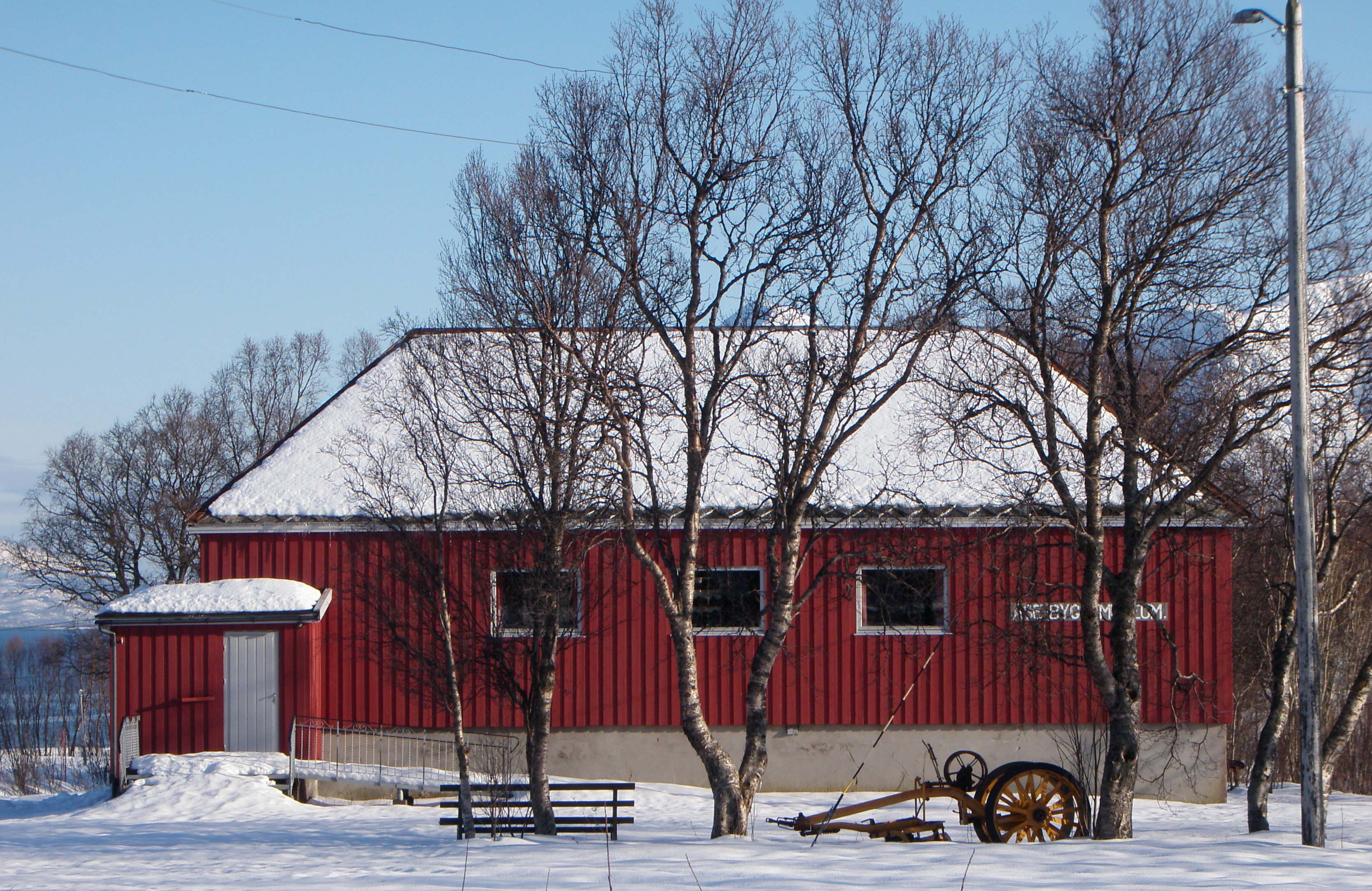
- Åse village museum
- Interactive map of Åse
- Location within Nordland Location within Norway
- Coordinates: 69.0120°N 15.7704°E
- Country: Norway
- Region: Northern Norway
- County: Nordland
- District: Vesterålen
- Municipality: Andøy Municipality

Area
  - Total: 0.43 km^{2} (0.17 sq mi)
- Elevation: 4 m (13 ft)

Population (2018)
  - Total: 272
  - Density: 633/km^{2} (1,640/sq mi)
- Time zone: UTC+01:00 (CET)
  - Summer (DST): UTC+02:00 (CEST)
- Post Code: 8484 Risøyhamn

Åse is a village in Andøy Municipality in Nordland county, Norway. The village is located along the Norwegian County Road 82 on the southeastern coast of the island of Andøya, along the Andfjorden. The village of Å lies about 5 kilometres (3.1 mi) to the north, and the villages of Bjørnskinn and Risøyhamn lie about 8 kilometres (5.0 mi) to the southwest.

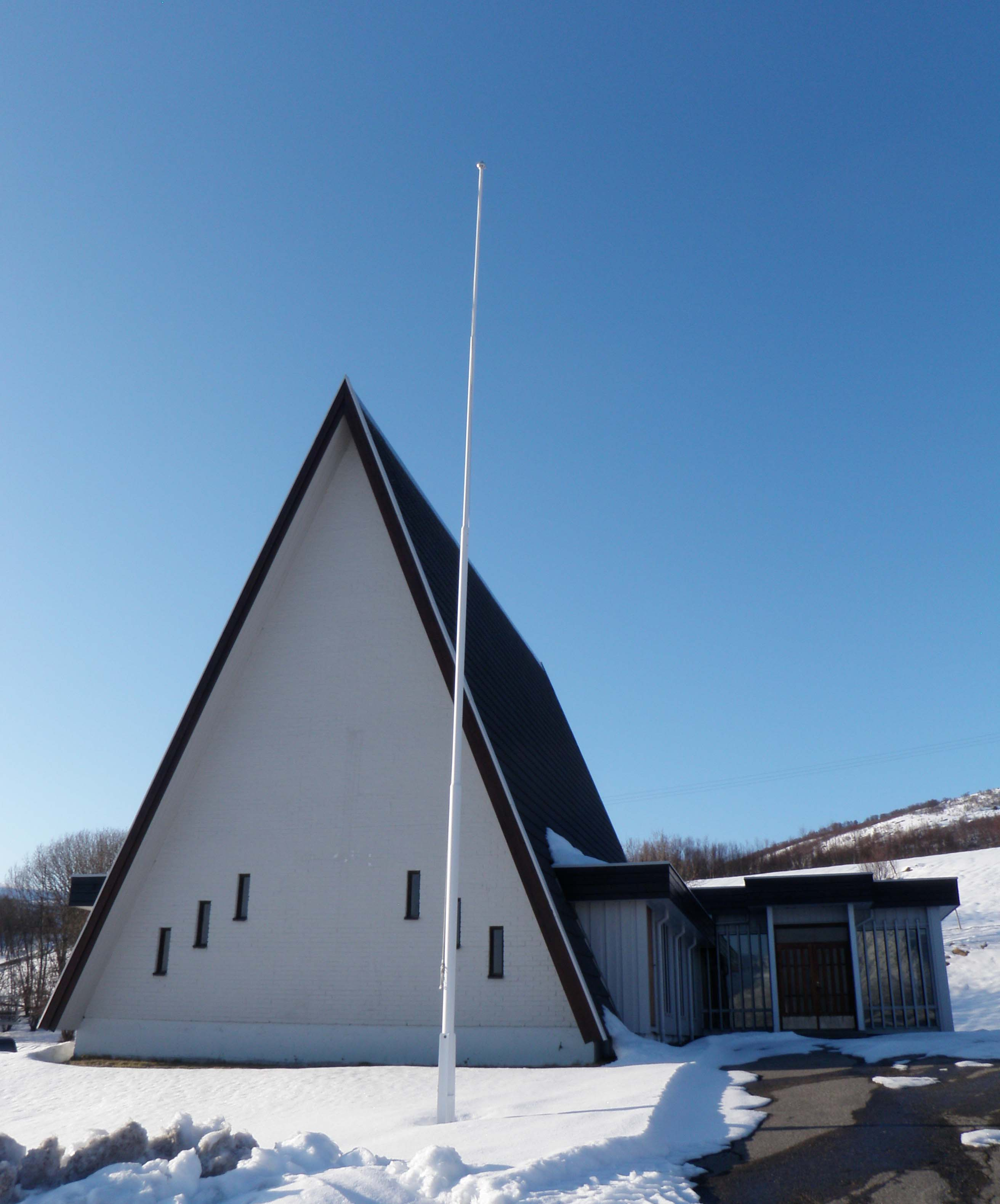
The Baptist church in Åse

The 0.43-square-kilometre (110-acre) village had a population (2018) of 272 and a population density of 633 inhabitants per square kilometre (1,640/sq mi). Since 2018, the population and area data for this village area has not been separately tracked by Statistics Norway.
