= Åknes =

Åknes may refer to:

- Åknes, Agder, a village in Åseral municipality in Agder county, Norway
- Åknes, Nordland, a village in Andøy municipality in Nordland county, Norway
- Åknes, Trøndelag, a village in Åfjord municipality in Trøndelag county, Norway
