= Dverberg Municipality =

Former municipality in Nordland, Norway

Dverberg Municipality Dverberg herred
- Former municipality
- Nordland within Norway

- Dverberg within Nordland
- Coordinates: 69.1064°N 15.9640°E
- Country: Norway
- County: Nordland
- District: Vesterålen
- Established: 1 Jan 1838
  - Created as: Formannskapsdistrikt
- Disestablished: 1 Jan 1964
  - Succeeded by: Andøy Municipality
- Administrative centre: Dverberg

Area (upon dissolution)
  - Total: 278.8 km^{2} (107.6 sq mi)
  - Rank: #296 in Norway
- Highest elevation: 620.2 m (2,035 ft)

Population (1963)
  - Total: 1,681
  - Rank: #500 in Norway
  - Density: 6/km^{2} (16/sq mi)
  - Change (10 years): ▲ +0.4%
- Demonym: Dverberg-folk

Official language
  - Norwegian form: Bokmål
- Time zone: UTC+01:00 (CET)
  - Summer (DST): UTC+02:00 (CEST)
- ISO 3166 code: NO-1872

Dverberg is a former municipality in Nordland county, Norway. The administrative centre was the village of Dverberg where Dverberg Church is located. The municipality existed from 1838 until its dissolution in 1964. The municipality encompassed the central areas on the island of Andøya in what is now Andøy Municipality. Starting out at about 616 square kilometres (238 sq mi) in 1838, it was reduced in size in 1924. Upon its dissolution in 1964, the municipality was only 279 square kilometres (108 sq mi).

Prior to its dissolution in 1964, the 279-square-kilometre (108 sq mi) municipality was the 296th largest by area out of the 689 municipalities in Norway. Dverberg Municipality was the 500th most populous municipality in Norway with a population of about 1,681. The municipality's population density was 6 inhabitants per square kilometre (16/sq mi) and its population had increased by 0.4% over the previous 10-year period.

== General information ==
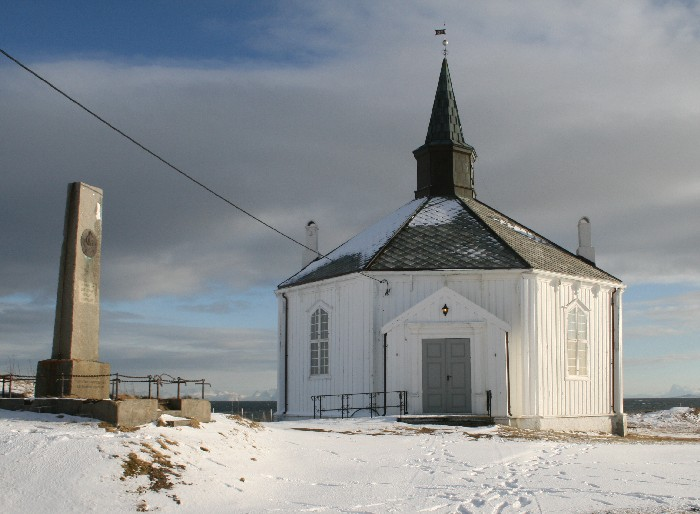
Dverberg church at Andøya with fisherman's memorial

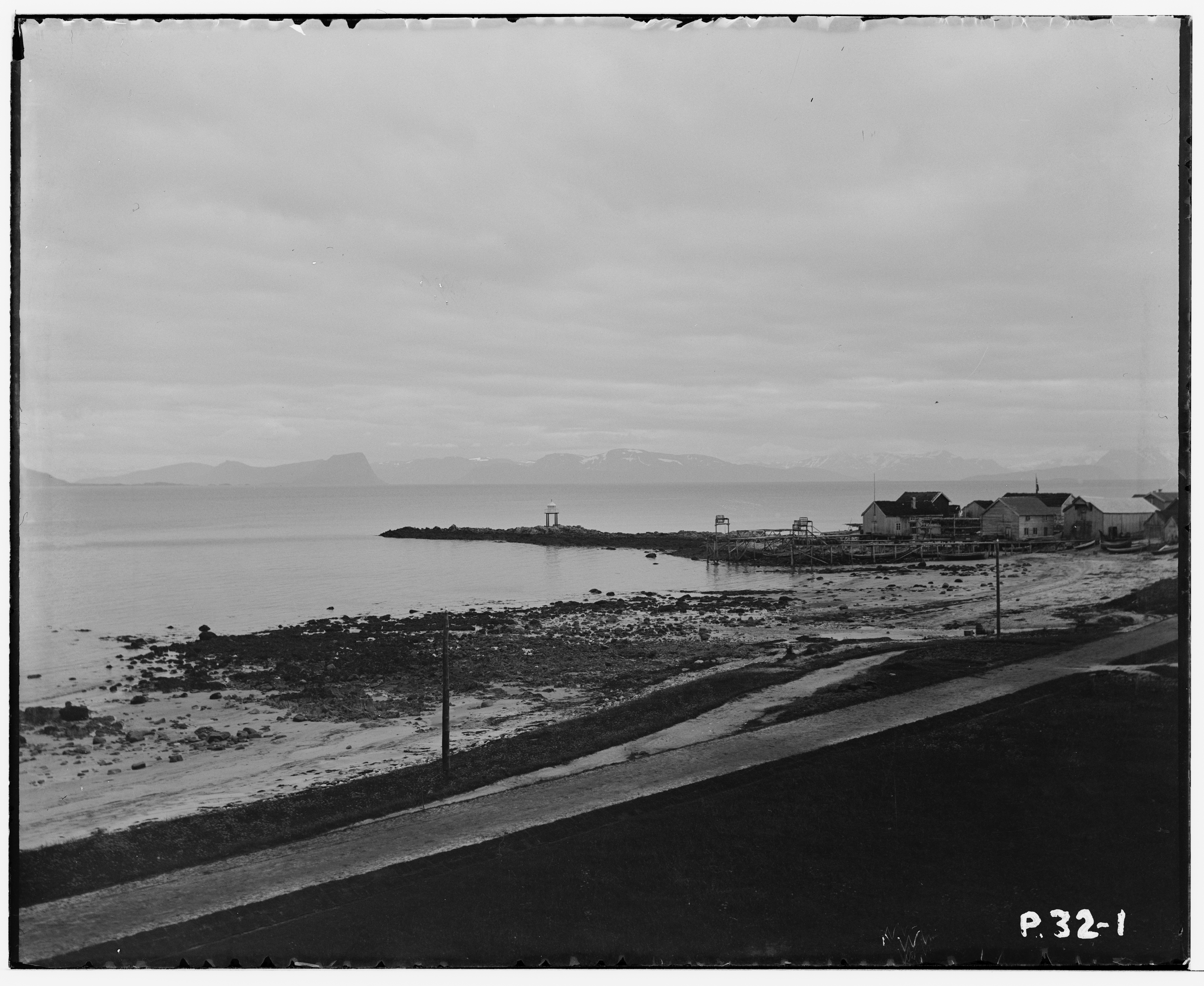
Coastline at Dverberg around 1900

The historic prestegjeld of Dverberg was established as a municipality on 1 January 1838 (see formannskapsdistrikt law). It originally included the whole island of Andøya as well as about 100 square kilometres (39 sq mi) on the northeastern tip of the large island of Hinnøya, plus a number of very small surrounding islets.

On 1 January 1924, Dverberg Municipality was divided into three. The northern part of Dverberg became the new Andenes Municipality (population: 2,213) and the southern part of Dverberg Municipality was separated to become the new Bjørnskinn Municipality (population: 1,410). This left 1,477 residents in Dverberg Municipality which now only covered the central part of the island of Andøya.

During the 1960s, there were many municipal mergers across Norway due to the work of the Schei Committee. On 1 January 1964, Dverberg Municipality (population: 1,719) was merged (back) with the neighboring Bjørnskinn Municipality (population: 1,835) and Andenes Municipality (population: 3,812) to create the new Andøy Municipality

=== Name ===
The municipality (originally the parish) is named after the old Dverberg farm (Old Norse: Dvergaberg) since the first Dverberg Church was built there. The first element is dvergr which means "dwarf". The last element is berg which means "mountain". Thus the name is referring to a mountain where dwarfs live.

=== Churches ===
The Church of Norway had one parish (sokn) within Dverberg Municipality. At the time of the municipal dissolution, it was part of the Dverberg prestegjeld and the Vesterålen prosti (deanery) in the Diocese of Sør-Hålogaland.

Churches in Dverberg Municipality
Parish (sokn)	Church name	Location of the church	Year built
Dverberg	Dverberg Church	Dverberg	1843

== Geography ==
The highest point in the municipality is the 620.2-metre (2,035 ft) tall mountain Ressmålstinden. The municipality was located in the central part of the island of Andøya. Andenes Municipality was located to the north and Bjørnskinn Municipality was located to the south. The Andfjorden was located to the east and the Norwegian Sea was located to the west of the municipality.

== Government ==
While it existed, Dverberg Municipality was responsible for primary education (through 10th grade), outpatient health services, senior citizen services, welfare and other social services, zoning, economic development, and municipal roads and utilities. The municipality was governed by a municipal council of directly elected representatives. The mayor was indirectly elected by a vote of the municipal council. The municipality was under the jurisdiction of the Hålogaland Court of Appeal.

=== Municipal council ===
The municipal council (Herredsstyre) of Dverberg Municipality was made up of 15 representatives that were elected to four-year terms. The tables below show the historical composition of the council by political party.

Dverberg herredsstyre 1959–1963
Party name (in Norwegian)	Number of representatives
Labour Party (Arbeiderpartiet)	7
Joint List(s) of Non-Socialist Parties (Borgerlige Felleslister)	8
Total number of members:	15
Note: This municipality became part of the new Andøy Municipality on 1 January 1964.

Dverberg herredsstyre 1955–1959
Party name (in Norwegian)	Number of representatives
Labour Party (Arbeiderpartiet)	7
Joint List(s) of Non-Socialist Parties (Borgerlige Felleslister)	8
Total number of members:	15

Dverberg herredsstyre 1951–1955
Party name (in Norwegian)	Number of representatives
Labour Party (Arbeiderpartiet)	6
Joint List(s) of Non-Socialist Parties (Borgerlige Felleslister)	6
Total number of members:	12

Dverberg herredsstyre 1947–1951
Party name (in Norwegian)	Number of representatives
Labour Party (Arbeiderpartiet)	5
Joint List(s) of Non-Socialist Parties (Borgerlige Felleslister)	7
Total number of members:	12

Dverberg herredsstyre 1945–1947
Party name (in Norwegian)	Number of representatives
Labour Party (Arbeiderpartiet)	4
List of workers, fishermen, and small farmholders (Arbeidere, fiskere, småbrukere liste)	1
Joint List(s) of Non-Socialist Parties (Borgerlige Felleslister)	6
Local List(s) (Lokale lister)	1
Total number of members:	12

Dverberg herredsstyre 1937–1941*
Party name (in Norwegian)	Number of representatives
Labour Party (Arbeiderpartiet)	4
Local List(s) (Lokale lister)	8
Total number of members:	12
Note: Due to the German occupation of Norway during World War II, no elections were held for new municipal councils until after the war ended in 1945.

=== Mayors ===
The mayor (Norwegian: ordfører) of Dverberg Municipality was the political leader of the municipality and the chairperson of the municipal council. Here is a list of people who held this position:

- 1838–1840: August Thorvald Deinboll
- 1840–1844: Augustinus Johannesen Sellevold
- 1844–1848: Ole Anton Norman
- 1848–1852: Augustinus Johannesen Sellevold
- 1852–1854: Thorstein Hoel Jersin
- 1854–1856: Even Andreas Falch
- 1856–1860: Augustinus Johannesen Sellevold
- 1861–1864: Ingebrigt Olai Nielsen
- 1865–1865: Hans Fredrik Angell
- 1866–1872: Johan David Osenbroch
- 1873–1874: Jens Casper Mikkelborg
- 1875–1876: Nils Christian Hansen
- 1877–1888: Peder Pettersen
- 1889–1890: Martinus Heggelund Andreassen
- 1891–1892: Emil Bernhard Falch Olsen
- 1893–1894: Peder Pettersen
- 1895–1898: Wilhelm Nagel
- 1899–1904: Peder Pettersen
- 1905–1913: Benjamin Konrad Pettersen
- 1914–1918: Svend Christian Svendsen
- 1918–1923: Daniel Hveding Hægstad
- 1924–1925: Hans Petter Dybwik
- 1926–1934: Cedolf Olsen Baraa
- 1935–1940: Olaf H. Pettersen
- 1946–1949: Egil Sæbøe
- 1949–1963: Lindberg Nyborg

== Notable people ==
- Torstein Raaby (1918–1964), a Norwegian resistance fighter and explorer

== See also ==
- List of former municipalities of Norway
