= Å, Andøy =

Village in Andøy Municipality, Norway

Å
- Village
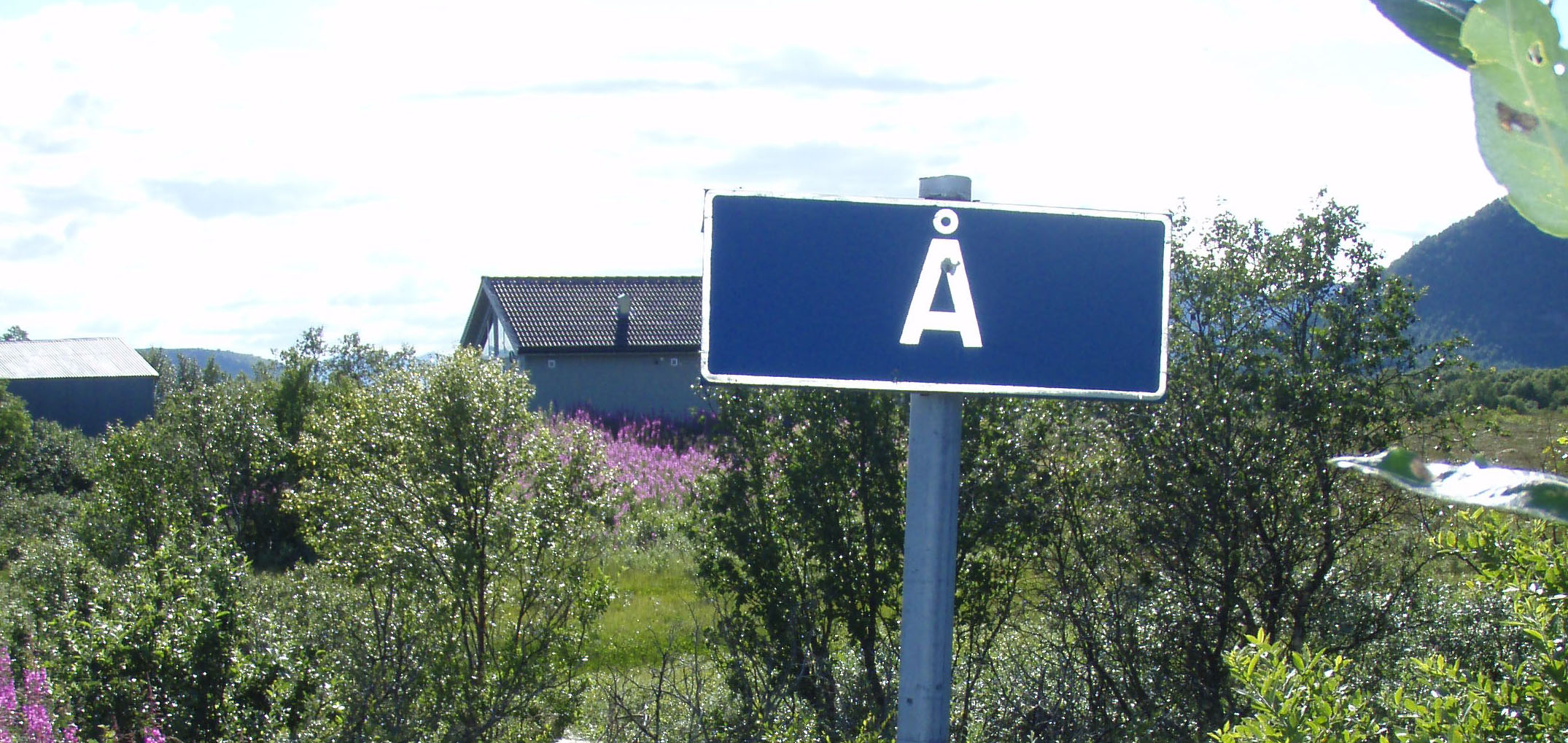
- View of the sign at the entrance to the village
- Interactive map of Å
- Location within Nordland Location within Norway
- Coordinates: 69.0508°N 15.8698°E
- Country: Norway
- Region: Northern Norway
- County: Nordland
- District: Vesterålen
- Municipality: Andøy Municipality
- Elevation: 5 m (16 ft)
- Time zone: UTC+01:00 (CET)
  - Summer (DST): UTC+02:00 (CEST)
- Post Code: 8485 Dverberg

Å is a village in Andøy Municipality in Nordland county, Norway. The village is located on the east coast of the island of Andøya along the Andfjorden. The village of Dverberg lies about 8 kilometres (5.0 mi) to the north and the village of Åse lies about 5 kilometres (3.1 mi) to the south. Its sign is often replaced due to people stealing it for novelty purposes.

== Name ==
The village (originally a farm) was first mentioned in 1567 ("Aa"). The name is from the Old Norse word á, which means "(small) river".

== See also ==
- List of short place names
- Place names considered unusual
