= Myrvang =

Myrvang is a surname. Notable people with the surname include:

- Finn Myrvang (born 1937), Norwegian historian
- Thore Myrvang (1858–1939), Norwegian educator and politician
