= Andenes Municipality =

Former municipality in Nordland, Norway

Andenes Municipality Andenes herred
- Former municipality
- Nordland within Norway

- Andenes within Nordland
- Coordinates: 69.3144°N 16.1194°E
- Country: Norway
- County: Nordland
- District: Vesterålen
- Established: 1 Jan 1924
  - Preceded by: Dverberg Municipality
- Disestablished: 1 Jan 1964
  - Succeeded by: Andøy Municipality
- Administrative centre: Andenes

Area (upon dissolution)
  - Total: 70.6 km^{2} (27.3 sq mi)
  - Rank: #557 in Norway
- Highest elevation: 466.9 m (1,532 ft)

Population (1963)
  - Total: 3,615
  - Rank: #246 in Norway
  - Density: 51.2/km^{2} (133/sq mi)
  - Change (10 years): ▲ +29.5%
- Demonym: Andværing

Official language
  - Norwegian form: Bokmål
- Time zone: UTC+01:00 (CET)
  - Summer (DST): UTC+02:00 (CEST)
- ISO 3166 code: NO-1873

Andenes is a former municipality in Nordland county, Norway. The 71-square-kilometre (27 sq mi) municipality existed from 1924 until its dissolution in 1964. The municipality included the northern part of the island of Andøya as well as many small surrounding islets and skerries in what is now Andøy Municipality. The administrative centre was the village of Andenes where the Andenes Church is located.

Prior to its dissolution in 1964, the 71-square-kilometre (27 sq mi) municipality was the 557th largest by area out of the 689 municipalities in Norway. Andenes Municipality was the 246th most populous municipality in Norway with a population of about 3,615. The municipality's population density was 51.2 inhabitants per square kilometre (133/sq mi) and its population had increased by 29.5% over the previous 10-year period.

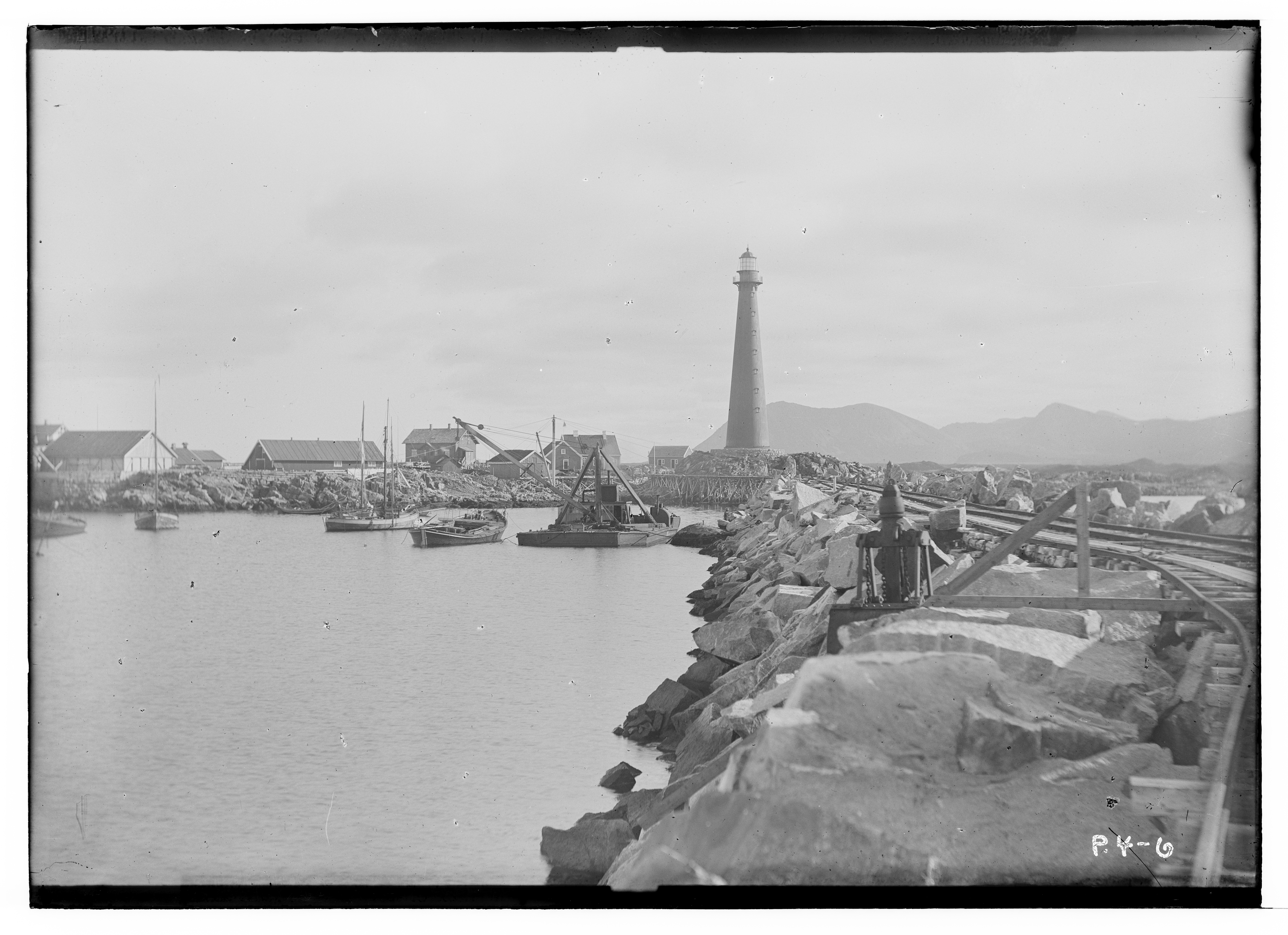
Historic photo of the village of Andenes

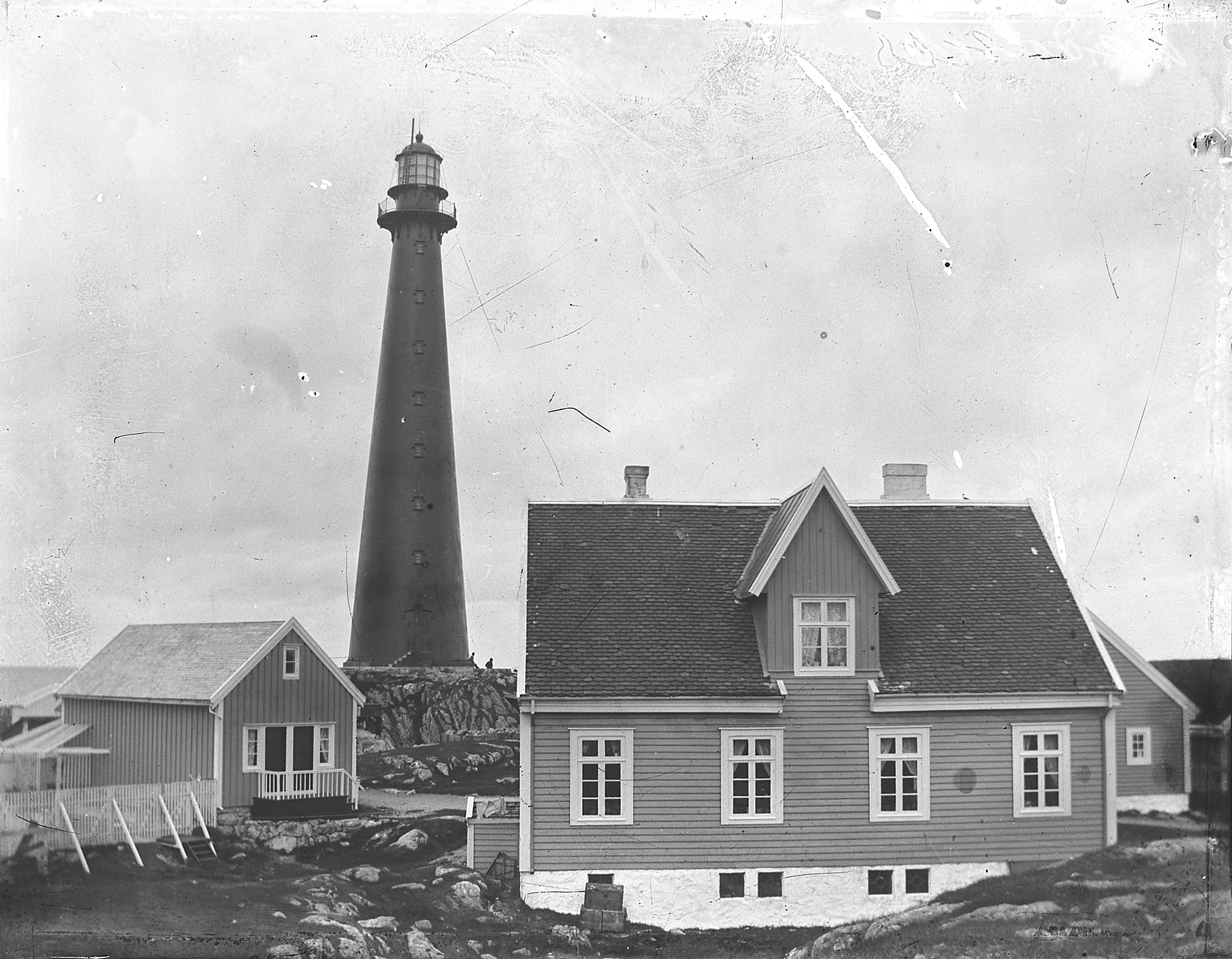
Andenes Lighthouse

== General information ==
The municipality of Andenes was established on 1 January 1924 when Dverberg Municipality was divided into three: Andenes Municipality (population: 2,213) in the north, Bjørnskinn Municipality (population: 1,410) in the south, and Dverberg Municipality (population: 1,477) in the central part of the old municipality.

During the 1960s, there were many municipal mergers across Norway due to the work of the Schei Committee. On 1 January 1964, Andenes Municipality (population: 3,812) was merged (back) with the neighboring Dverberg Municipality (population: 1,719) and Bjørnskinn Municipality (population: 1,835) to create the new Andøy Municipality.

=== Name ===
The municipality is named after the old village of Andenes (Old Norse: Andarnes). The first element is the genitive case of Ǫnd (originally Ǫmd) which is the old name for the island of Andøya. The meaning of the island's name is uncertain. The last element is nes which means "headland".

=== Churches ===
The Church of Norway had one parish (sokn) within Andenes Municipality. At the time of the municipal dissolution, it was part of the Dverberg prestegjeld and the Vesterålen prosti (deanery) in the Diocese of Sør-Hålogaland.

Churches in Andenes Municipality
Parish (sokn)	Church name	Location of the church	Year built
Andenes	Andenes Church	Andenes	1876

== Geography ==
The highest point in the municipality is the 466.9-metre (1,532 ft) tall mountain Røyken. The municipality was located at the north end of the island of Andøya. Dverberg Municipality was located to the south. The Andfjorden was located to the east and the Norwegian Sea was located to the north and west of the municipality.

== Government ==
While it existed, Andenes Municipality was responsible for primary education (through 10th grade), outpatient health services, senior citizen services, welfare and other social services, zoning, economic development, and municipal roads and utilities. The municipality was governed by a municipal council of directly elected representatives. The mayor was indirectly elected by a vote of the municipal council. The municipality was under the jurisdiction of the Hålogaland Court of Appeal.

=== Municipal council ===
The municipal council (Herredsstyre) of Andenes Municipality was made up of 21 representatives that were elected to four year terms. The tables below show the historical composition of the council by political party.

Andenes herredsstyre 1959–1963
Party name (in Norwegian)	Number of representatives
Labour Party (Arbeiderpartiet)	9
Joint List(s) of Non-Socialist Parties (Borgerlige Felleslister)	5
Local List(s) (Lokale lister)	7
Total number of members:	21
Note: This municipality became part of the new Andøy Municipality on 1 January 1964.

Andenes herredsstyre 1955–1959
Party name (in Norwegian)	Number of representatives
Labour Party (Arbeiderpartiet)	9
Conservative Party (Høyre)	3
Communist Party (Kommunistiske Parti)	1
Local List(s) (Lokale lister)	8
Total number of members:	21

Andenes herredsstyre 1951–1955
Party name (in Norwegian)	Number of representatives
Labour Party (Arbeiderpartiet)	6
Joint List(s) of Non-Socialist Parties (Borgerlige Felleslister)	2
Local List(s) (Lokale lister)	4
Fishermen and workers list (Fiskernes og arbeidernes liste)	4
Total number of members:	16

Andenes herredsstyre 1947–1951
Party name (in Norwegian)	Number of representatives
Labour Party (Arbeiderpartiet)	3
List of workers, fishermen, and small farmholders (Arbeidere, fiskere, småbrukere liste)	3
Joint List(s) of Non-Socialist Parties (Borgerlige Felleslister)	3
Local List(s) (Lokale lister)	7
Total number of members:	16

Andenes herredsstyre 1945–1947
Party name (in Norwegian)	Number of representatives
Local List(s) (Lokale lister)	16
Total number of members:	16

Andenes herredsstyre 1937–1941*
Party name (in Norwegian)	Number of representatives
Labour Party (Arbeiderpartiet)	4
List of workers, fishermen, and small farmholders (Arbeidere, fiskere, småbrukere liste)	1
Local List(s) (Lokale lister)	11
Total number of members:	16
Note: Due to the German occupation of Norway during World War II, no elections were held for new municipal councils until after the war ended in 1945.

=== Mayors ===
The mayor (Norwegian: ordfører) of Andenes Municipality was the political leader of the municipality and the chairperson of the municipal council. Here is a list of people who held this position:

- 1924–1931: Andreas Mikal Lorentsen (V)
- 1932–1940: Walberg August Storstrand
- 1946–1947: Henry Olaisen
- 1948–1949: Peder Johnsen
- 1950–1959: Arvid Mathisen
- 1960–1963: Knut Bolstad

== See also ==
- List of former municipalities of Norway
