= Furfjord =

Furfjord is the surname of approx. 50 people in Norway, with family ties to Forfjord in Northern Norway.
