= Skogvollvatnet =

Lake in Nordland, Norway

- Interactive map of the lake
- Location: Nordland
- Coordinates: 69.1548°N 15.8104°E
- Basin countries: Norway
- Max. length: 3.4 kilometres (2.1 mi)
- Max. width: 1.2 kilometres (0.75 mi)
- Surface area: 2.74 km^{2} (1.06 sq mi)
- Shore length^{1}: 9.51 kilometres (5.91 mi)
- Surface elevation: 6 metres (20 ft)
- References: NVE
- ^{1} Shore length is not a well-defined measure.

Skogvollvatnet is a lake in Andøy Municipality in Nordland county, Norway. The 2.74-square-kilometre (1.06 sq mi) lake lies on the west coast of the island of Andøya. There is a 150-to-200-metre (490 to 660 ft) wide isthmus of land between the lake and the ocean on the west side of the lake. The tiny village of Skogvoll lies on the isthmus between the lake and the ocean.

== See also ==
- List of lakes in Norway
