= Forfjorden =

Fjord in Nordland, Norway

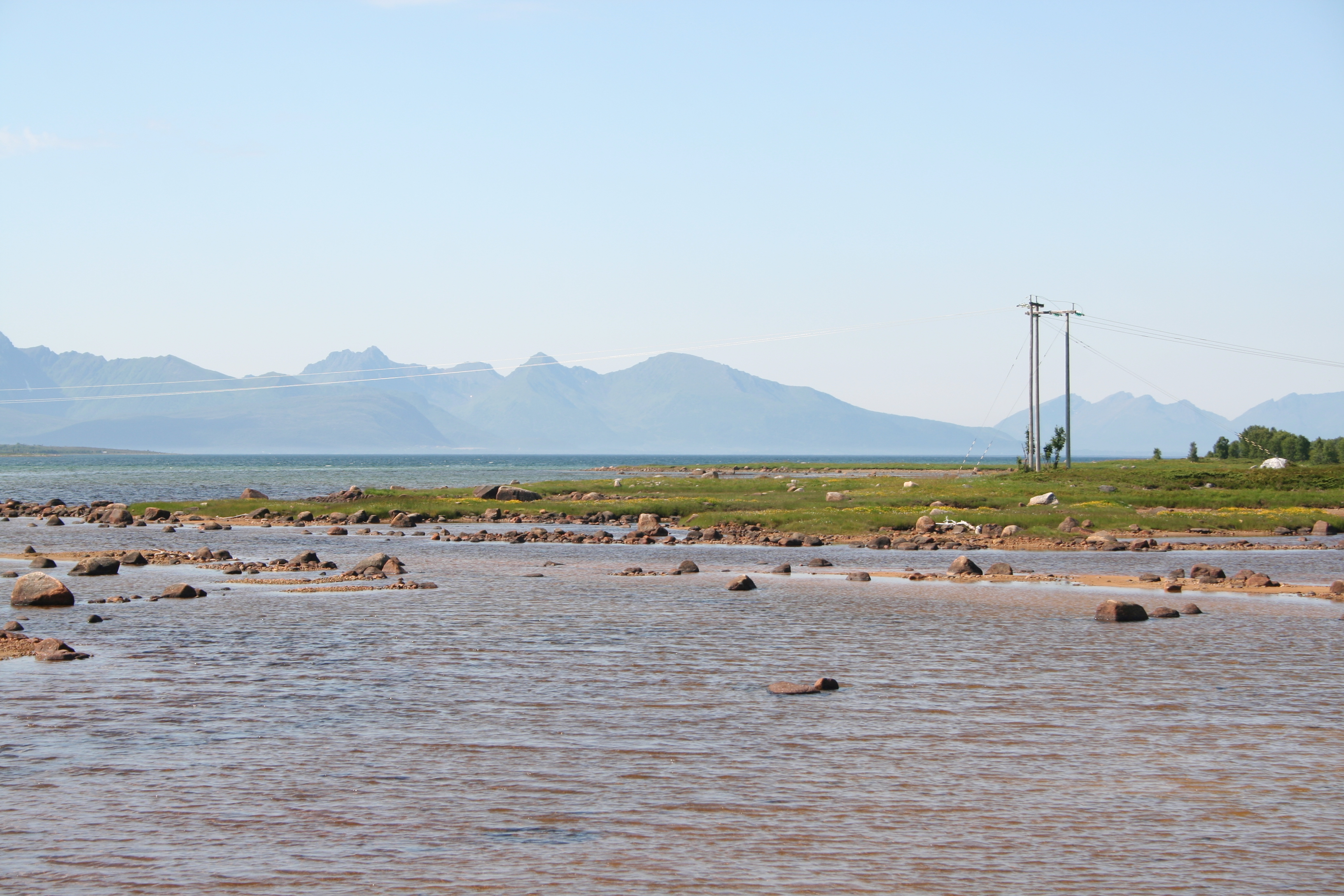
- View of the fjord
- Interactive map of the fjord
- Location: Nordland county, Norway
- Coordinates: 68.8337°N 15.5711°E
- Type: Fjord
- Primary outflows: Gavlfjorden
- Basin countries: Norway
- Max. length: 7 kilometres (4.3 mi)
- Max. width: 3.3 kilometres (2.1 mi)

Forfjorden is a fjord on the west side of the island of Hinnøya in the Vesterålen archipelago in Nordland county, Norway. The fjord lies along the border between Sortland Municipality and Andøy Municipality. The Norwegian County Road 82 follows the shoreline around the whole fjord. The coast around the Forfjorden has about 70 inhabitants. The fjord is located about 30 kilometres (19 mi) northeast of the town of Sortland and about 70 kilometres (43 mi) south of Andenes. The name is derived from its surrounding pine forest, as "Furu" and "Forra" translates to pine tree. The 7-kilometre (4.3 mi) long fjord flows to the west and joins the Gavlfjorden along with the Risøysundet and Sortlandssundet straits.

The area around the fjord has rich resources for small and large game hunters, rivers and mountain lakes attracting sports fishermen from near and far, and a nature reserve with the oldest living pine trees on record in Northern Europe. Among 1000-year-old living trees, trees still standing have been dated to 830 AD. It is assumed that this forest served as source of timber and tar for viking ships, and there are settlements and burial sites that have not yet been excavated.

== History ==
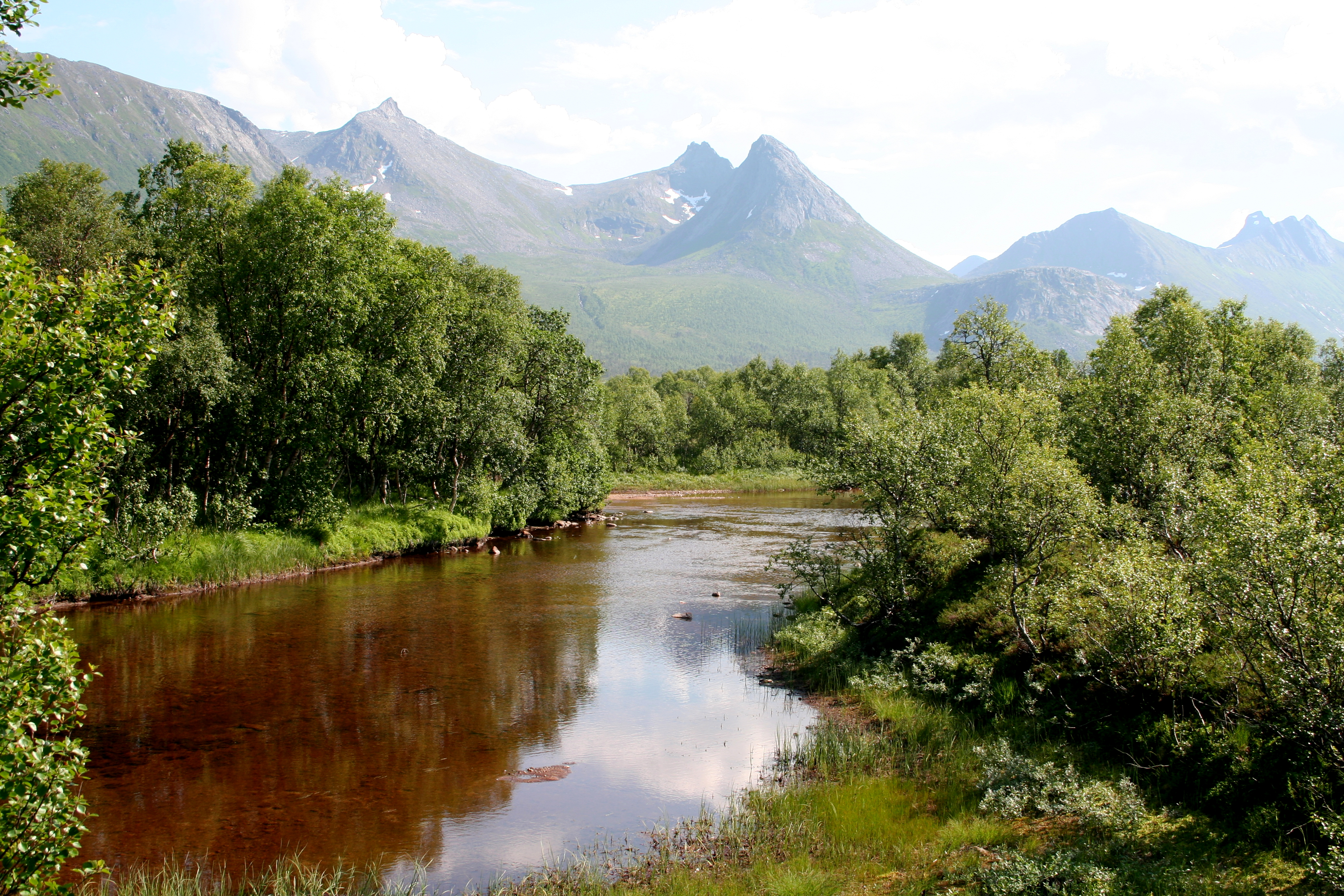
The Forfjord valley

The home of Hans J. Furfjord (also known as Hans Jørgensen, Hans Jørnsa), who led the first expedition to stay the winter on Svalbard, to hunt for silver foxes, walruses, seals and polar bears was located along the Forfjorden. Skins (from silver foxes in particular), salted meat and animal oils were precious commodities at the time. Items from his expeditions are stored in museums in Tromsø and on Svalbard and he wrote diaries so far only available in Norwegian. Among weather descriptions and catch reports, they contain well-written stories of adventurous European monarchs visiting, his being imprisoned by British soldiers for not supplying them for free, barely surviving polar bear encounters, and nearly freezing to death in then barren Svalbard during the frozen Arctic winters. He was known to be an excellent marksman, but also for his expedition bravery, leadership, determination, blacksmith skills and medical know-how. He died at the age of 81 at home in Forfjord.
