= Åknes, Nordland =

Village in Andøy Municipality, Norway

Åknes
- Village
- Interactive map of Åknes
- Location within Nordland Location within Norway
- Coordinates: 68.9715°N 15.4423°E
- Country: Norway
- Region: Northern Norway
- County: Nordland
- District: Vesterålen
- Municipality: Andøy Municipality
- Elevation: 8 m (26 ft)
- Time zone: UTC+01:00 (CET)
  - Summer (DST): UTC+02:00 (CEST)
- Post Code: 8484 Risøyhamn

Åknes is a village in Andøy Municipality in Nordland county, Norway. The village is located on the southwestern part of the island of Andøya, along the Gavlfjorden. The village is located about 10 kilometres (6.2 mi) southwest of the village of Bjørnskinn.
