= Andenes =

Village in Andøy Municipality, Norway

Andenes: Andenes (Norwegian); Ánddanjárga (Northern Sami)
- Village
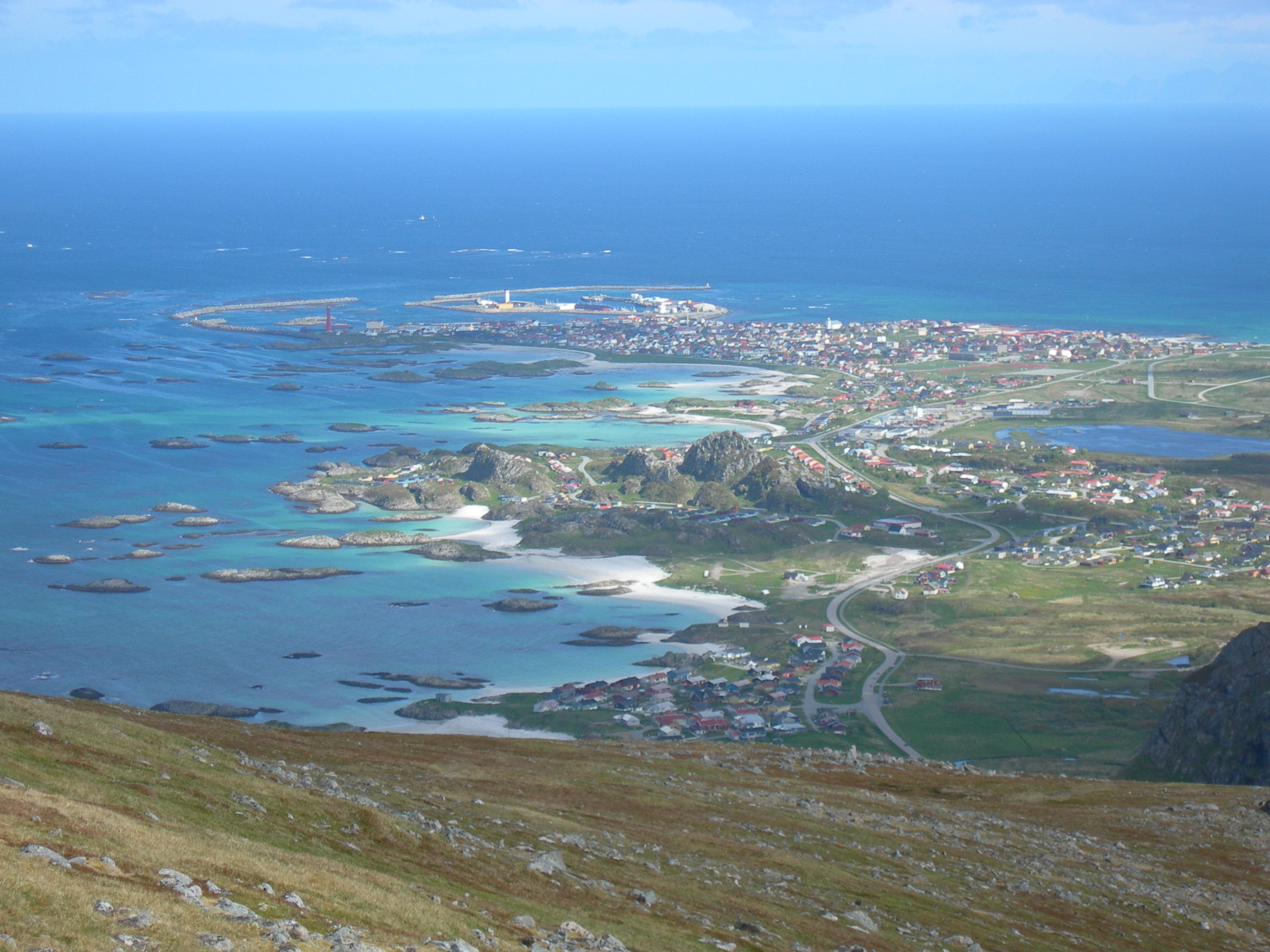
- View of Andenes (seen from Mount Røyken)
- Interactive map of Andenes
- Location within Nordland Location within Norway
- Coordinates: 69.3144°N 16.1194°E
- Country: Norway
- Region: Northern Norway
- County: Nordland
- District: Vesterålen
- Municipality: Andøy Municipality

Area
  - Total: 1.76 km^{2} (0.68 sq mi)
- Elevation: 6 m (20 ft)

Population (2023)
  - Total: 2,535
  - Density: 1,440/km^{2} (3,700/sq mi)
- Time zone: UTC+01:00 (CET)
  - Summer (DST): UTC+02:00 (CEST)
- Post Code: 8480 Andenes
- Climate: Dfc

Andenes (Norwegian) or Ánddanjárga (Northern Sami) is the administrative centre of Andøy Municipality which is located in the Vesterålen district of Nordland county, Norway. The village of Andenes is the northernmost settlement of the island of Andøya (and in Nordland county).

To the east is the island of Senja (in Troms county), and to the west the endless horizon of the North Atlantic Ocean. Andenes Lighthouse sits along the harbor and can be seen for long distances. Andøya Airport, Andenes is located just south of the village, off of Norwegian County Road 82.

The 1.76-square-kilometre (430-acre) village has a population (2023) of 2,535 and a population density of 1,440 inhabitants per square kilometre (3,700/sq mi).

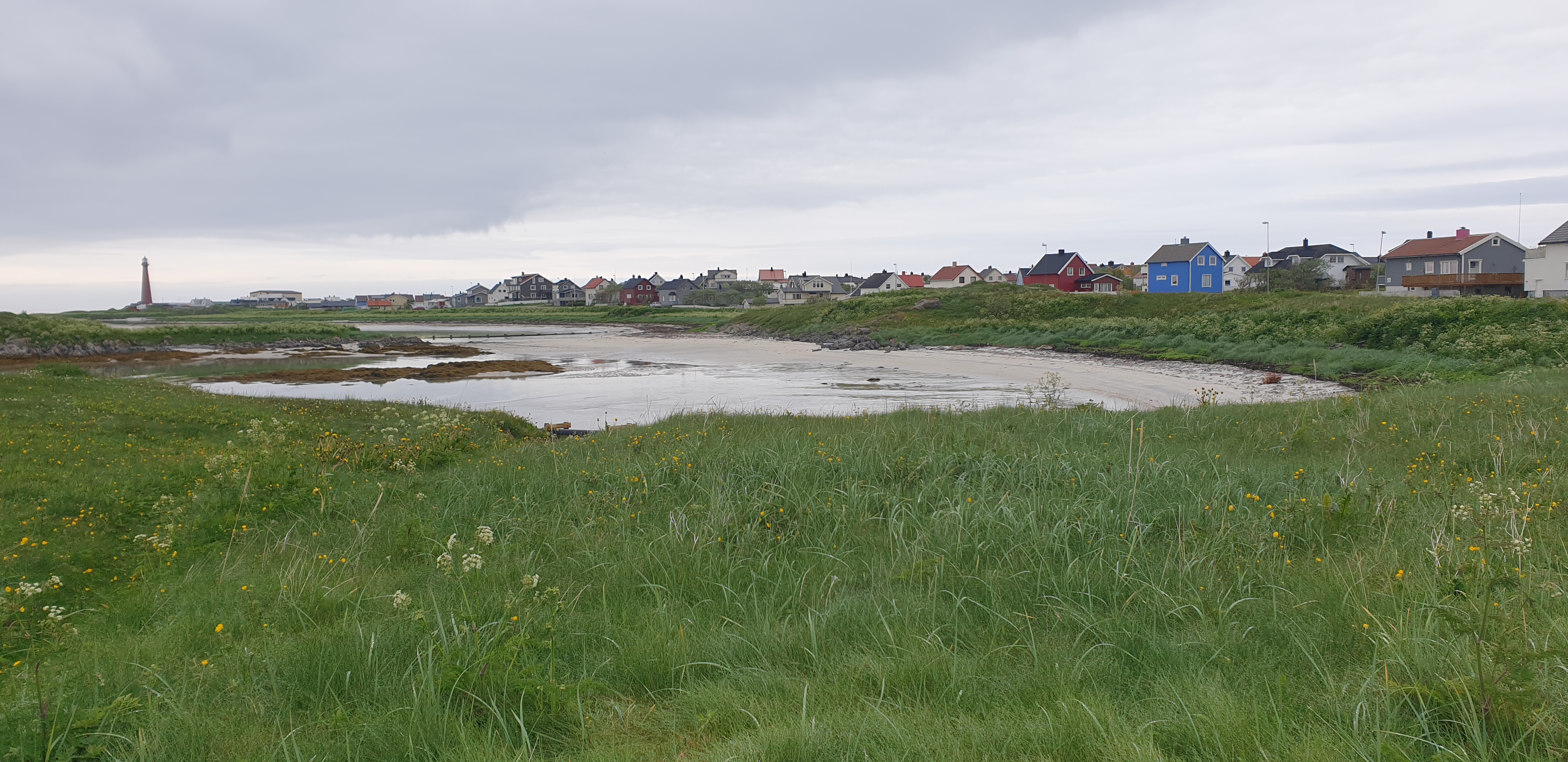
View of Andenes

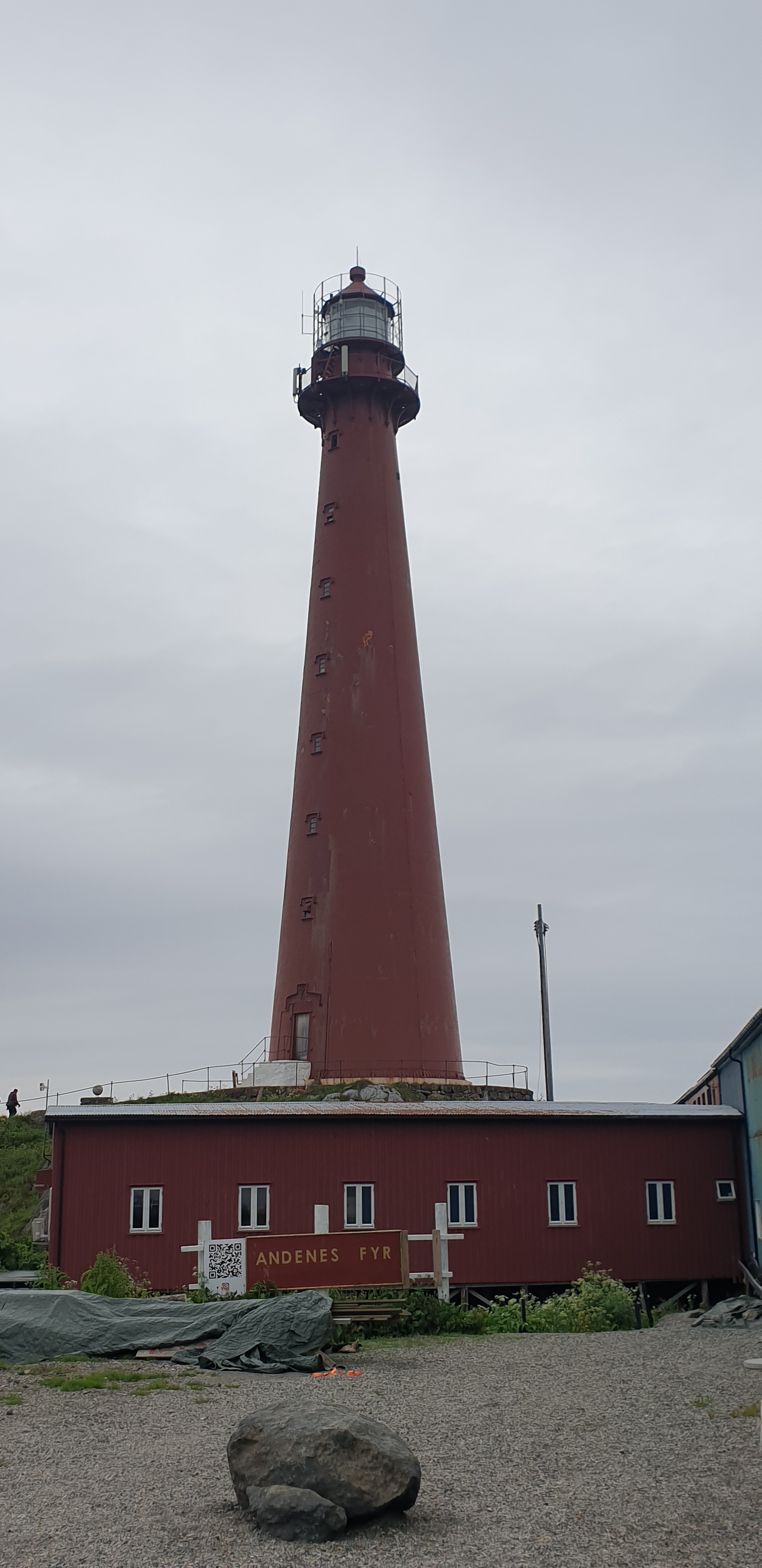
Andenes Lighthouse

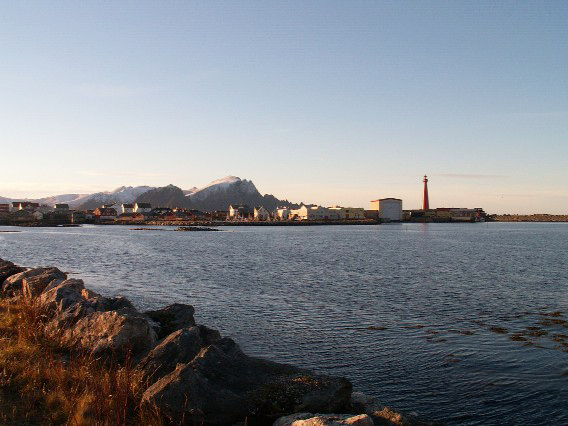
Andenes harbour

== History ==
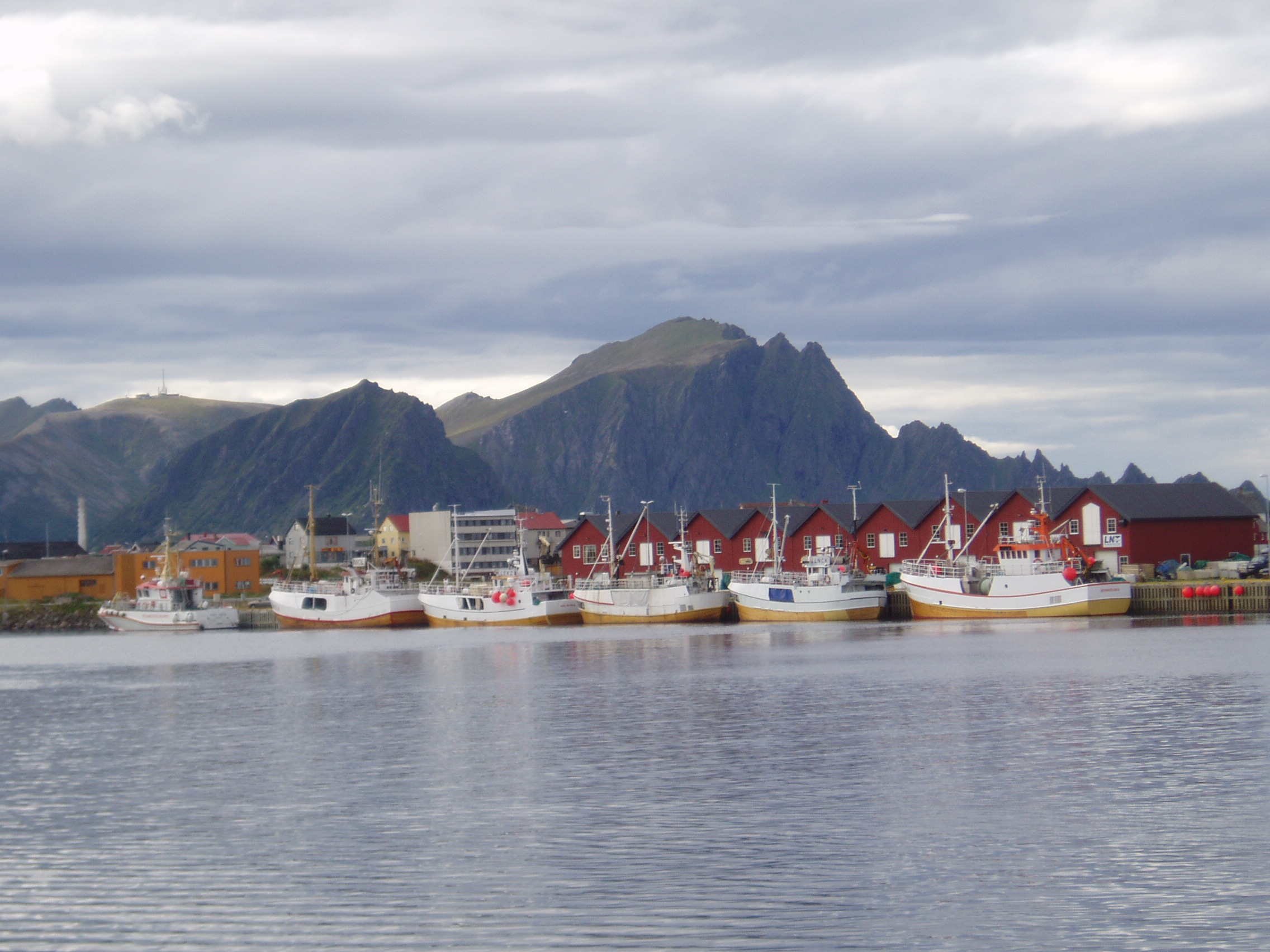
View of the local fishing boats

Andenes was already an important fishing village during the Iron Age. By the early 1900s, it had become one of the largest fishing ports in Norway.

On 1 January 1924, the northern part of Dverberg Municipality was separated to become the new Andenes Municipality, including the village of Andenes, which became its administrative centre. Initially, Andenes Municipality had 2,213 residents. On 1 January 1964, Andenes Municipality was merged with Dverberg Municipality and Bjørnskinn Municipality to create the new Andøy Municipality.

In the early 1980s, the population of the village of Andenes was 3,770, which made it the largest village in Vesterålen. The downsizing of Andøya Air Station and general population centralization in Norway has led to a dramatic decline in inhabitants over the last 20 years.

Tourism has become an important source of income for Andenes in recent years. The town's location on the coast by a narrow section of continental shelf has led to the town becoming a major centre for whale watching.

The lighthouse of Andenes is a famous landmark, finished in 1859. It is open for visitors the whole year.

== Name ==
The Old Norse form of the name was Andarnes (from originally Amdarnes). The first element is the genitive case of Ömd (the old name of the island Andøya) and the last element is nes which means "headland".

During the danish rule, the name Andenæs, was used. But changed to Andenes in the early 1900.

== Air Station ==
The construction of Andøya Air Station was commissioned in 1952 and funded in large part by NATO. It was to be situated between Haugnes and Andenes. A DC-3 Dakota of the Royal Norwegian Air Force (RNoAF) undertook the first landing on 17 September 1954. The air station however was not fully operative until 15 September 1957.

In 1961, the 333 Squadron was moved from Sola Air Station to Andøya with their Grumman HU-16 Albatross. In 1969, these were replaced by the Lockheed P-3 Orion. In 1989, the Lockheed P-3C Orion replaced the aging P-3Bs. However, two of the newest P-3Bs were converted to P-3Ns and fly missions for the Norwegian Coast Guard. Besides fisheries, Andøya Air Station has been the largest workplace in Andøy since the 1970s.

In the autumn of 2011, an Orion aircraft from Andenes patrolled the Indian Ocean from a forward base in the Seychelles, supported by 44 personnel and contributing 29 patrols of 8–10 hours to NATO's anti-piracy operation. The flights led directly to the arrest of five pirate groups.

== Geography ==
The village lies 300 kilometres (190 mi) north of the Arctic Circle and the midnight sun is visible from May 19 to July 25. The sun is below the horizon from November 25 to January 28.

=== Climate ===
Andenes is surrounded by the sea on all sides, which moderates both winter and summer temperatures. It has a climate on the boundary between the subarctic and the subpolar oceanic climates, being mild for its latitude. Summers are very cool, whereas even during the polar night period, daytime highs typically rise above freezing.

Climate data for Andenes 1991-2020 (10 m, extremes 1958-2024)
Month	Jan	Feb	Mar	Apr	May	Jun	Jul	Aug	Sep	Oct	Nov	Dec	Year
Record high °C (°F)	9.0 (48.2)	8.1 (46.6)	9.6 (49.3)	15.1 (59.2)	22.5 (72.5)	27.2 (81.0)	27.6 (81.7)	25.7 (78.3)	21.0 (69.8)	16.6 (61.9)	14 (57)	10.5 (50.9)	27.6 (81.7)
Mean daily maximum °C (°F)	1.2 (34.2)	0.7 (33.3)	1.5 (34.7)	4.2 (39.6)	8.3 (46.9)	11.1 (52.0)	14 (57)	13.9 (57.0)	11.1 (52.0)	6.7 (44.1)	3.8 (38.8)	2.1 (35.8)	6.6 (43.8)
Daily mean °C (°F)	−0.9 (30.4)	−1.4 (29.5)	−0.6 (30.9)	2 (36)	5.9 (42.6)	8.9 (48.0)	11.6 (52.9)	11.6 (52.9)	8.8 (47.8)	4.7 (40.5)	1.7 (35.1)	0.2 (32.4)	4.4 (39.9)
Mean daily minimum °C (°F)	−3.4 (25.9)	−4 (25)	−3.3 (26.1)	−0.9 (30.4)	3.1 (37.6)	6.7 (44.1)	9.3 (48.7)	9.1 (48.4)	6.2 (43.2)	2.4 (36.3)	−0.3 (31.5)	−2.3 (27.9)	1.9 (35.4)
Record low °C (°F)	−19.9 (−3.8)	−18.4 (−1.1)	−19.8 (−3.6)	−13.6 (7.5)	−10.5 (13.1)	−1.1 (30.0)	0.6 (33.1)	0.5 (32.9)	−4.2 (24.4)	−11.0 (12.2)	−14.1 (6.6)	−17.4 (0.7)	−19.9 (−3.8)
Average precipitation mm (inches)	118.2 (4.65)	102.7 (4.04)	88.4 (3.48)	74.7 (2.94)	59.2 (2.33)	52.5 (2.07)	66.4 (2.61)	75.6 (2.98)	110.9 (4.37)	146.0 (5.75)	107.8 (4.24)	119.1 (4.69)	1,122.1 (44.18)
Source: yr.no/Météo Climat

== Culture ==
Andenes Church is located in the central part of the village. The local newspaper is named Andøyposten. Andenes hosts the annual "Rock mot Rus" (Rock against drugs) festival, where young people perform their own rock music as well as better known headliners such as Dead by April, Dimmu Borgir, Kvelertak, Turdus Musicus and Torch.

== Notable residents ==
- Tom Stenvoll, a footballer for Stabæk
- David Pedersen, a singer known from the TV-show Idol
- Nanna With, a journalist
- Kristian Obasi Rekdal, an amateur kickboxer and BJJ-practitioner
