= Andenes Lighthouse =

Coastal lighthouse in Andøy, Norway

Andenes Lighthouse Andenes fyrstasjon
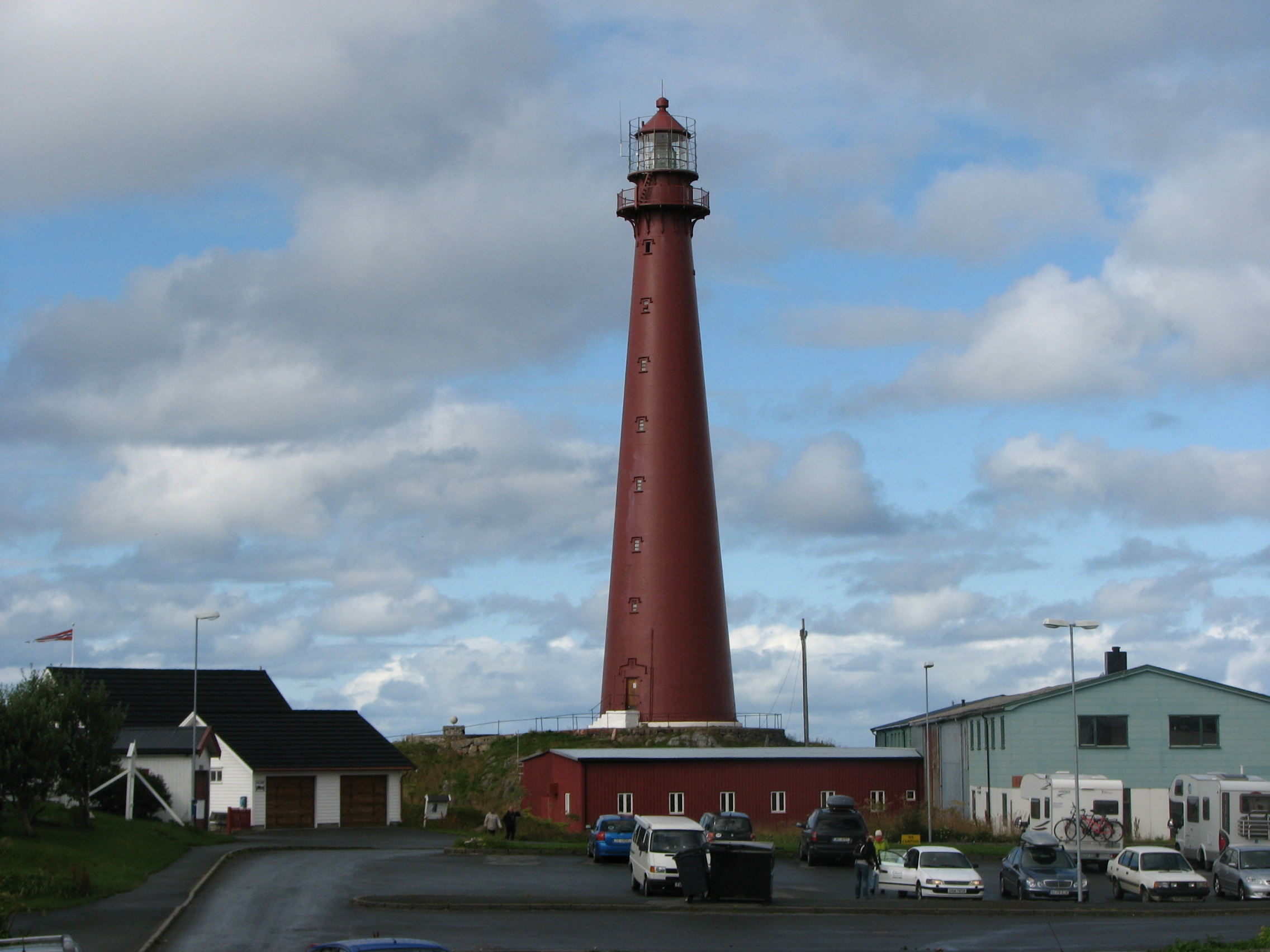
- View of the lighthouse
- Location of the lighthouse
- Location: Nordland, Norway
- Coordinates: 69°19′26″N 16°06′57″E

Tower
- Constructed: 1859
- Construction: Cast iron
- Automated: 1978
- Height: 40 metres (130 ft)
- Shape: Tapered cylindrical tower
- Markings: Red
- Operator: Andøymuseet
- Heritage: cultural heritage preservation in Norway

Light
- Focal height: 40 metres (130 ft)
- Lens: Fresnel lens
- Intensity: 152,500 cd (continuous); 2,358,000 candela (flash)
- Range: 17.8 nmi (33.0 km; 20.5 mi)
- Characteristic: FFl W 30s
- Norway no.: 822000

Andenes Lighthouse (Norwegian: Andenes fyr) is a coastal lighthouse in Andøy Municipality in Nordland county, Norway. It is located in the village of Andenes at the northern end of the island of Andøya in the Vesterålen archipelago. It was established in 1859 and automated in 1978. The lighthouse was listed as a protected site in 1999.

The lighthouse emits a continuous white light with a more intense flash every 30 seconds. The light sits atop a 40-metre (130 ft) tall red round cast iron tower. The light can be seen for about 18 nautical miles (33 km; 21 mi). The light burns from August 10 until April 26 each year, but there is no light the rest of the year due to the midnight sun at this location. The lighthouse is managed by the nearby Andøy Museum (Andøymuseet), which offers guided tours during the summer season. As a result, this is the best known and most visited lighthouse of Norway's Arctic region.

== See also ==
- Lighthouses in Norway
- List of lighthouses in Norway
