= Bjørnskinn Church =

- Bjørnskinn kirke
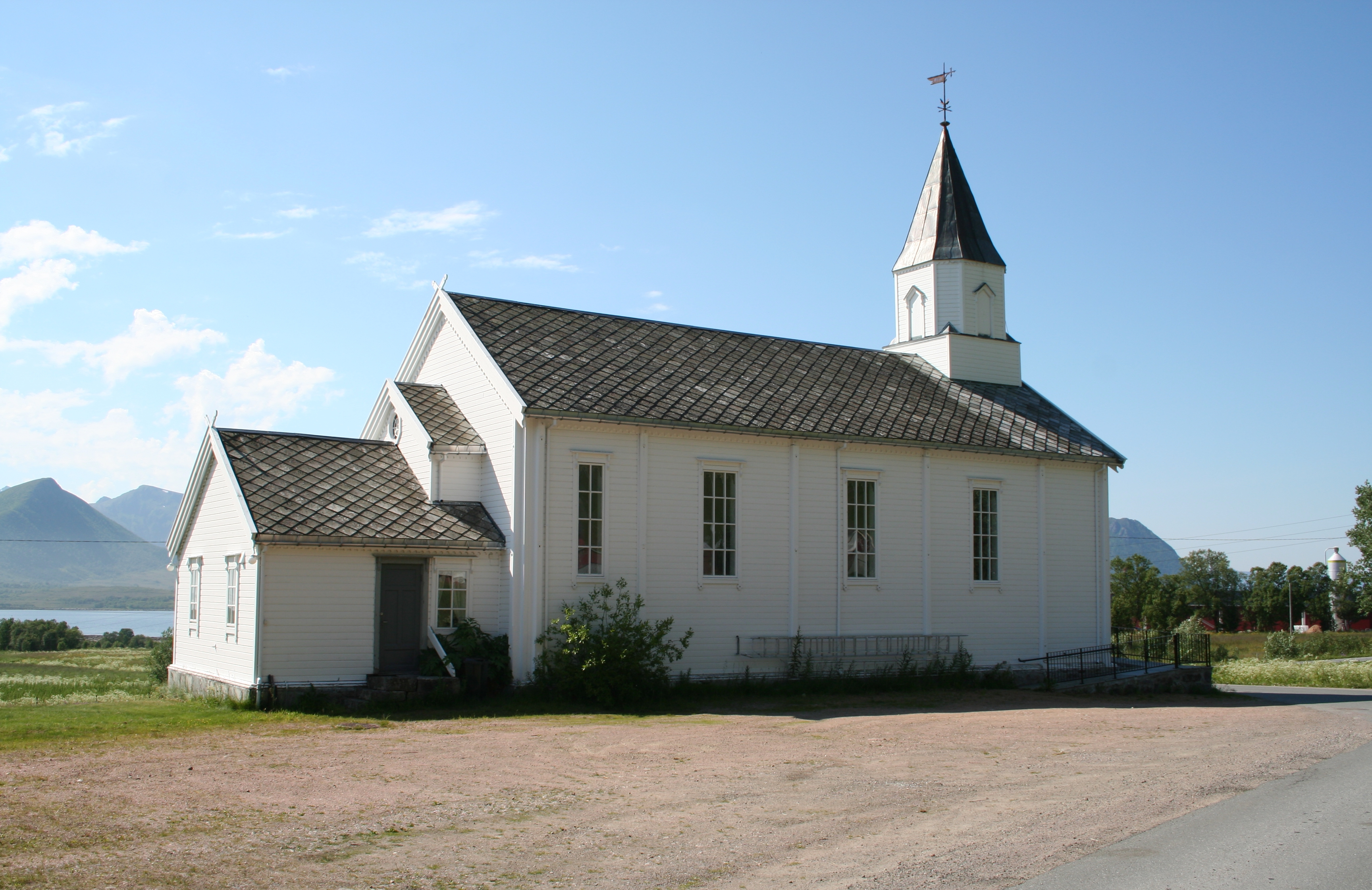
- View of the church
- Bjørnskinn Church
- 69.0000249°N 15.6334443°E
- Location: Andøy Municipality, Nordland
- Country: Norway
- Denomination: Church of Norway
- Churchmanship: Evangelical Lutheran

History
- Status: Parish church
- Founded: 1700s
- Consecrated: 29 April 1885

Architecture
- Functional status: Active
- Architect: Johan Kunig
- Architectural type: Long church
- Completed: 1885 (141 years ago)

Specifications
- Capacity: 250
- Materials: Wood

Administration
- Diocese: Sør-Hålogaland
- Deanery: Vesterålen prosti
- Parish: Andøy
- Norwegian Cultural Heritage Site
- Type: Church
- Status: Not protected
- ID: 83909

Bjørnskinn Church (Norwegian: Bjørnskinn kirke) is a parish church of the Church of Norway in Andøy Municipality in Nordland county, Norway. It is located in the village of Bjørnskinn on the island of Andøya. It is one of the churches for the Andøy parish which is part of the Vesterålen prosti (deanery) in the Diocese of Sør-Hålogaland. The white, wooden church was built in a long church style in 1885 by the architect Johan Kunig. The church seats about 250 people.

== History ==
The oldest church in Bjørnskinn was located right at the base of the local mountain on the north side of the village of Bjørnskinn. Historical records show that the church was in use in 1589, but it was not a new church at that time. That church was destroyed in an avalanche around the year 1740. A new wooden church was built soon after, about 375 metres (1,230 ft) to the southeast, further away from the base of the mountain. That church lasted over 100 years before it needed replacement. The new church was built in 1885 and it was designed by the local architect, Johan Kunig, to seat about 250 people. The new church was consecrated on 29 April 1885 by the Bishop Jacob Sverdrup Smitt. The organ in Bjørnskinn Church was built in 1860 and has been at the church since 1936.

== Media gallery ==
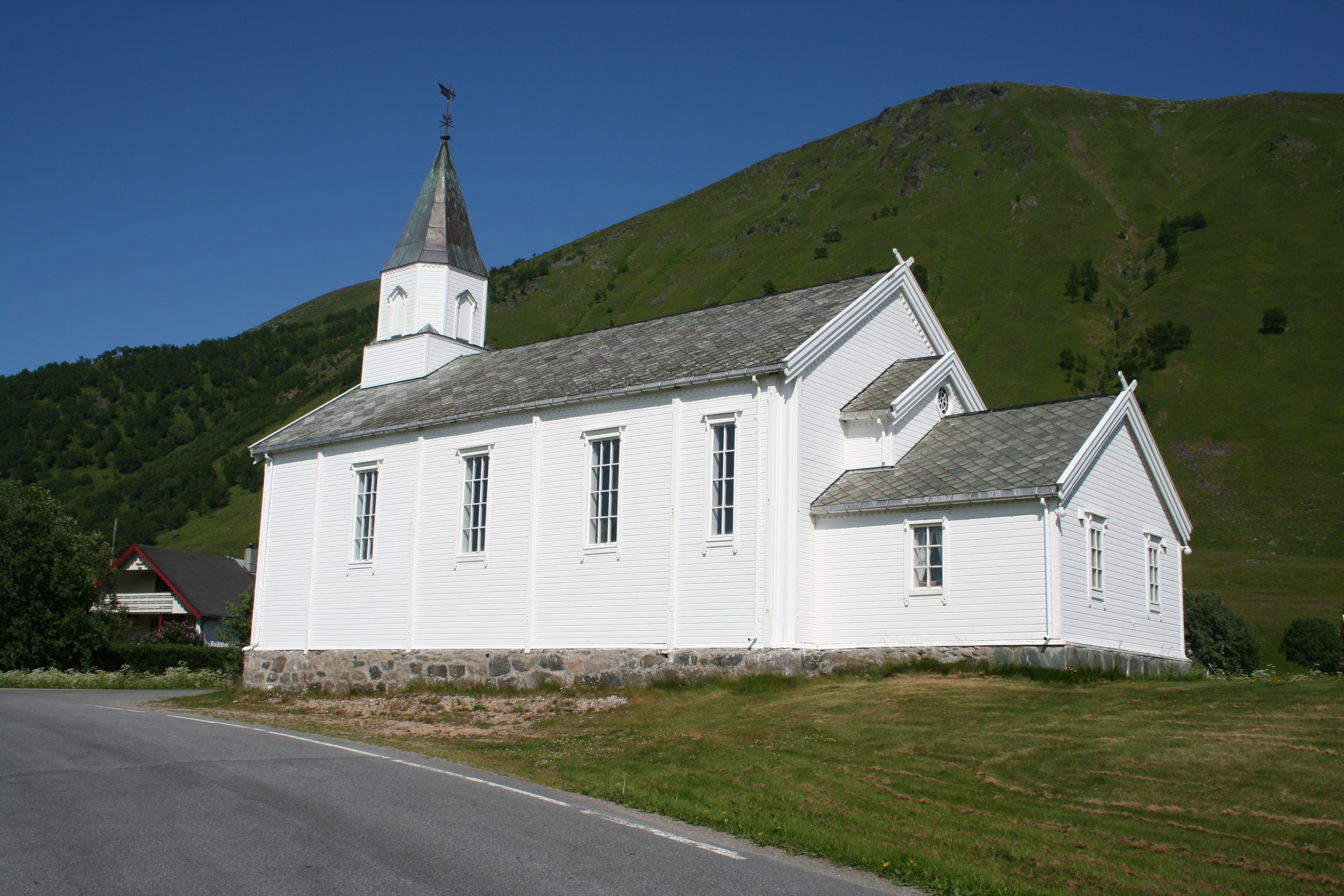

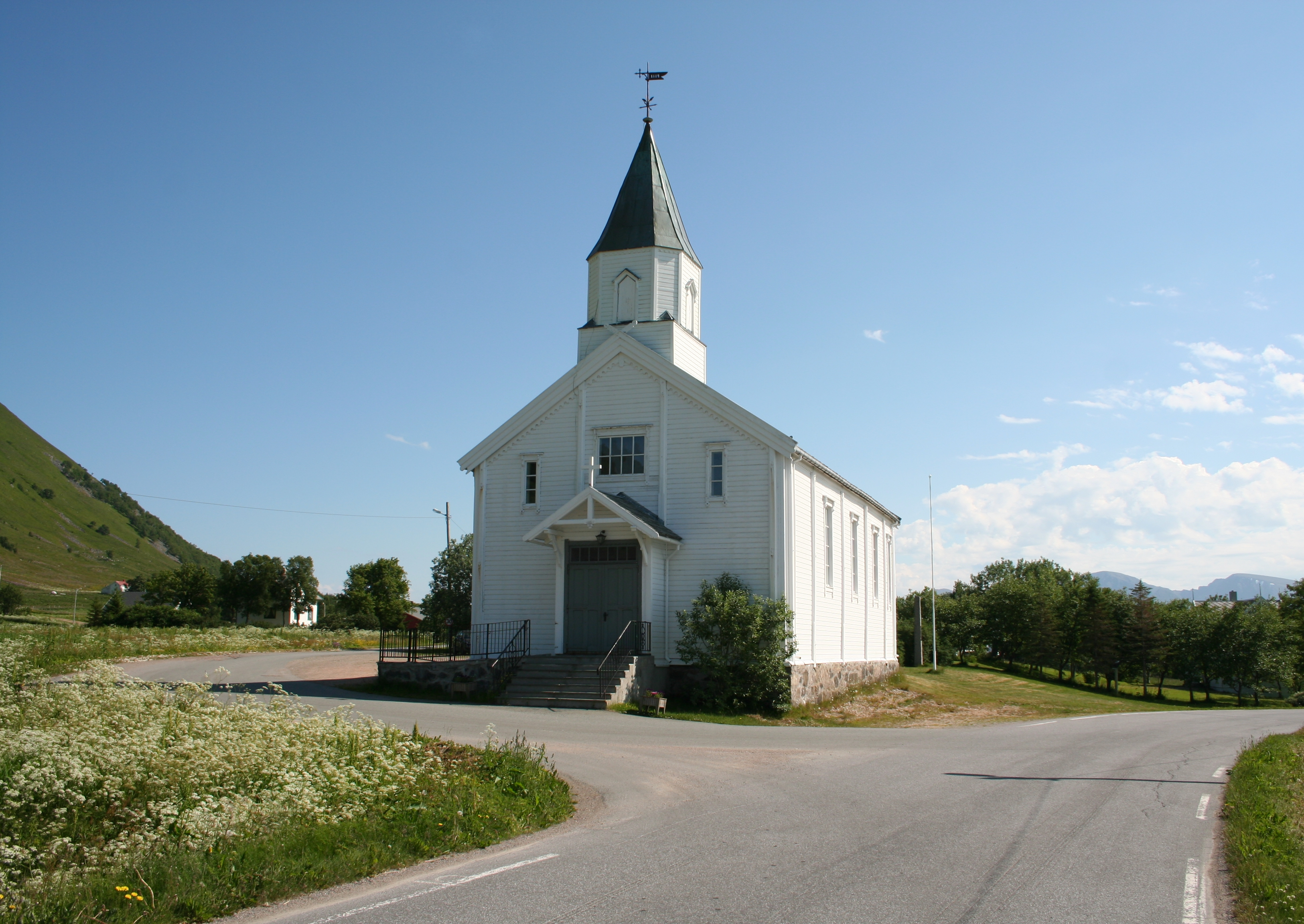

== See also ==
- List of churches in Sør-Hålogaland
