= Andøy Municipality =

Municipality in Nordland, Norway

Andøy Municipality Andøy kommune
- Municipality
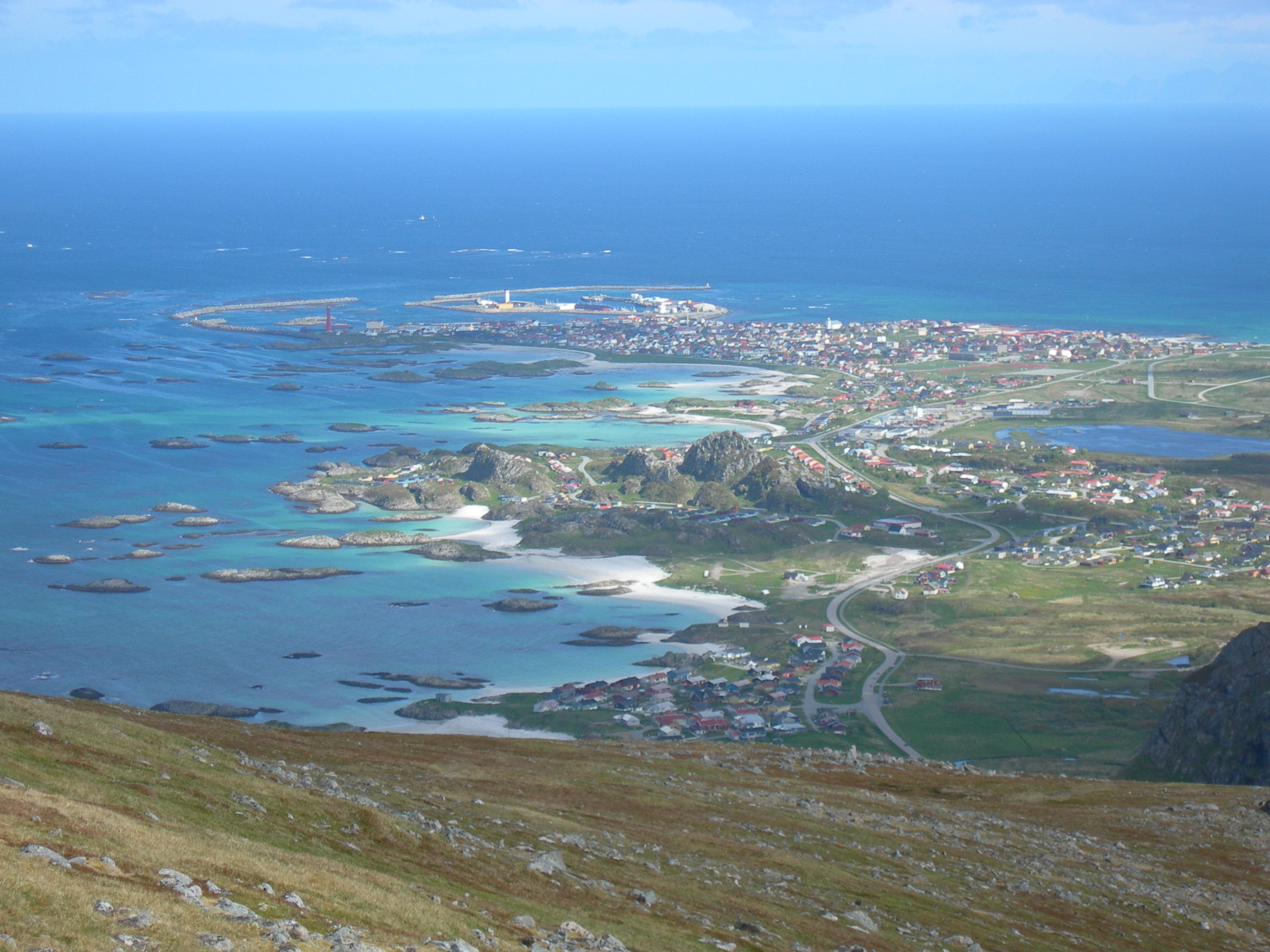
- View of the village of Andenes in Andøy

- Flag Coat of arms

- Nordland within Norway

- Andøy within Nordland
- Coordinates: 69°05′40″N 15°45′52″E
- Country: Norway
- County: Nordland
- District: Vesterålen
- Established: 1 Jan 1964
  - Preceded by: Andenes, Bjørnskinn, and Dverberg
- Administrative centre: Andenes

Government
  - Mayor (2023): Kjell-Are Johansen (Ap)

Area
  - Total: 656.18 km^{2} (253.35 sq mi)
  - Land: 616.77 km^{2} (238.14 sq mi)
  - Water: 39.41 km^{2} (15.22 sq mi) 6%
  - Rank: #172 in Norway
- Highest elevation: 889.18 m (2,917.3 ft)

Population (2024)
  - Total: 4,553
  - Rank: #191 in Norway
  - Density: 6.9/km^{2} (18/sq mi)
  - Change (10 years): ▼ −8.8%
- Demonym: Andværing

Official language
  - Norwegian form: Neutral
- Time zone: UTC+01:00 (CET)
  - Summer (DST): UTC+02:00 (CEST)
- ISO 3166 code: NO-1871
- Website: Official website

Andøy is the northernmost municipality in Nordland county, Norway. It is part of the Vesterålen archipelago. The main island in the municipality is Andøya. The administrative centre of the municipality is the village of Andenes at the northernmost point in the municipality. Other villages in the municipality include Bjørnskinn, Bleik, Dverberg, Fiskenes, Fornes, Nordmela, Risøyhamn, Skarstein, Å, Åknes, and Åse.

The 656-square-kilometre (253 sq mi) municipality is the 172nd largest by area out of the 357 municipalities in Norway. Andøy Municipality is the 191st most populous municipality in Norway with a population of 4,553. The municipality's population density is 6.9 inhabitants per square kilometre (18/sq mi) and its population has decreased by 8.8% over the previous 10-year period.

== General information ==
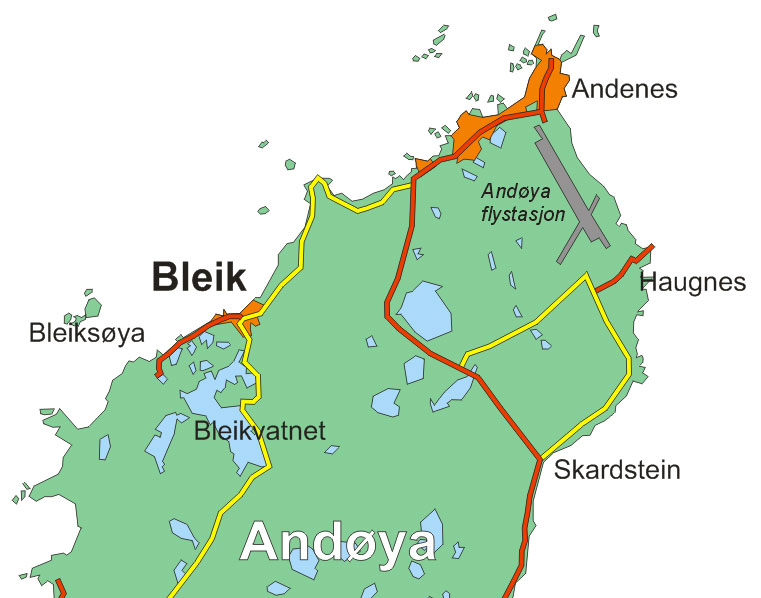
Andenes and Bleik are located on the northern part of Andøya

The municipality of Andøy was established as a new municipality on 1 January 1964 due to the work of the Schei Committee. Andøy Municipality was created from the merger of Andenes Municipality (population: 3,812), Bjørnskinn Municipality (population: 1,835), and Dverberg Municipality (population: 1,719). Initially, the new Andøy Municipality had 7,366 residents. The municipal boundaries have not changed since that time.

=== Name ===
The municipality is named after the island on which it is located, Andøya (Old Norse: Amdarøy). The first element is the genitive case of the old uncompounded name of the island Ǫmd which has an unknown meaning. The last element is øy which means "island".

=== Coat of arms ===
The coat of arms was granted on 7 January 1983. The official blazon is "Azure, a schnecke argent from base sinister to sinister" (Norwegian: Delt av blått og sølv ved virvelsnitt mot venstre). This means the arms have a field (background) that is divided by a line called a schnecke (a swirling counter-clockwise spiral design that is looks like a wave). The field located below the line has a tincture of argent which means it is commonly colored white, but if it is made out of metal, then silver is used. The tincture above the line is blue. The colors and design of the arms were chosen as a symbol for the fact that the municipality is situated at the sea and that fishing is important economically to the municipality. The arms were designed by Hallvard Trætteberg after an idea of Henry Oddlo Erichsen.

=== Churches ===
The Church of Norway has three parishes (sokn) within Andøy Municipality. It is part of the Vesterålen prosti (deanery) in the Diocese of Sør-Hålogaland.

Churches in Andøy Municipality
Parish (sokn)	Church name	Location of the church	Year built
Andenes	Andenes Church	Andenes	1876
Bjørnskinn	Bjørnskinn Church	Bjørnskinn	1885
Dverberg	Dverberg Church	Dverberg	1843
Dverberg	Fornes Chapel	Fornes	1965

=== Rocket Range ===
Andøya Space, formerly Andøya Rocket Range, is a civilian rocket range located a few kilometres south of Andenes. As of 2022, construction is in progress for a spaceport capable of launching small satellites. Andøya Space supports research as well as providing educational programming and military work. It also operates another launch site in Ny-Ålesund, Svalbard.

== Geography ==
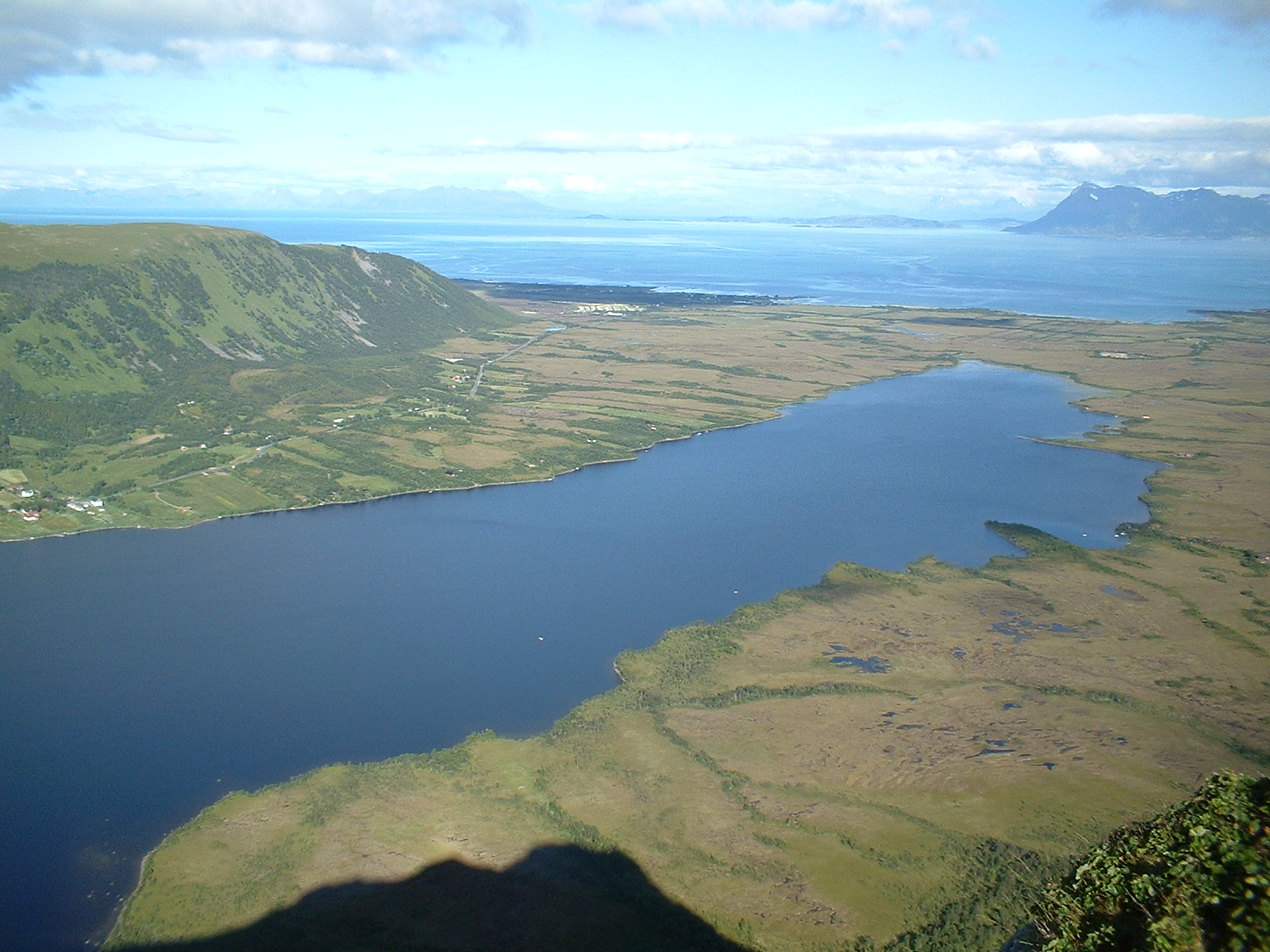
Part of Andøya seen towards the east

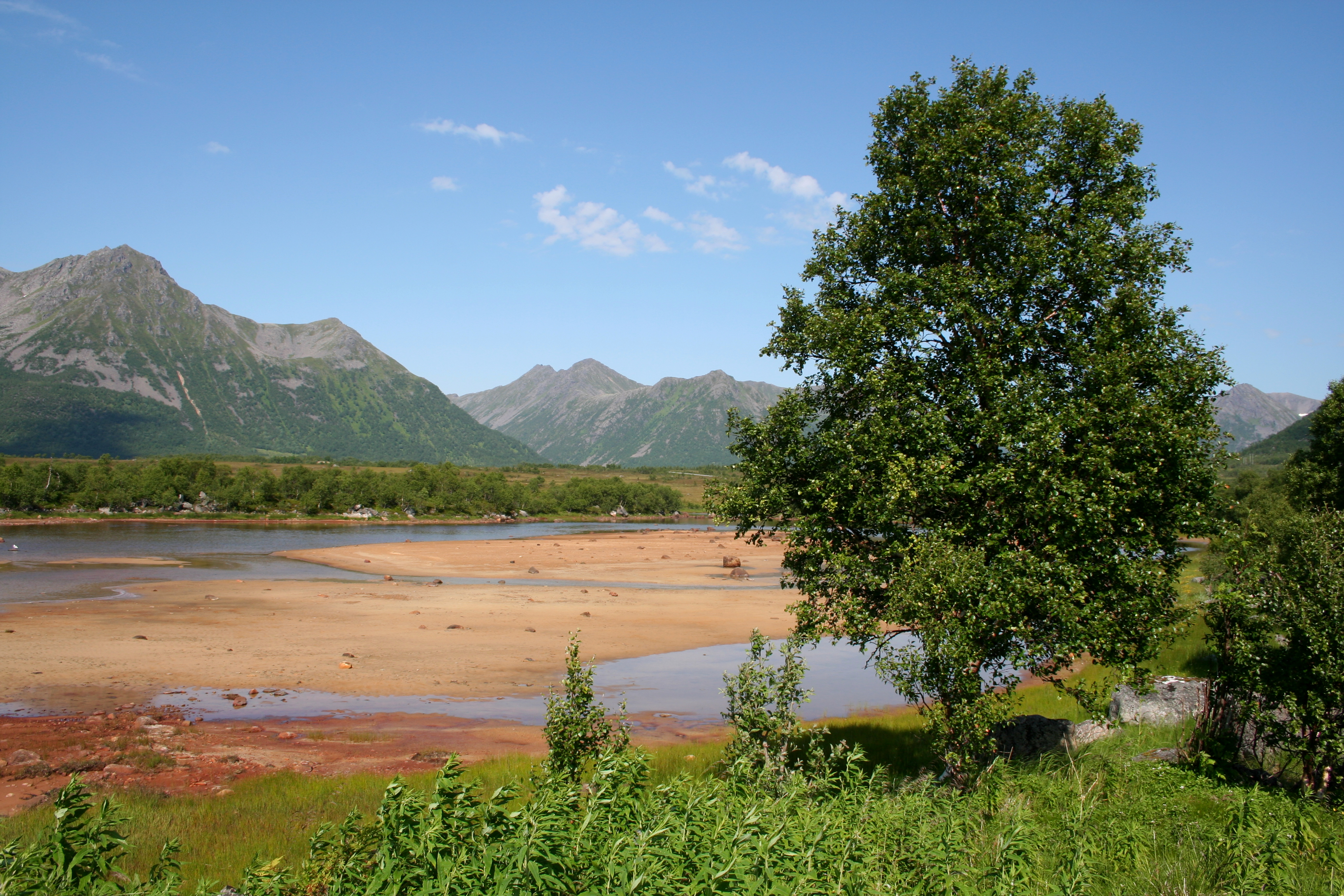
Forfjord valley on Hinnøya, partly in Andøy municipality.

Andøy Municipality is spread across the island of Andøya (the northernmost island in the Vesterålen archipelago) and the northeastern part of the island of Hinnøya (the largest and most populous island in Norway). The municipality also consists of smaller skerries including Bleiksøya, Vomma, and Stavaøyan. Andøy is located between the Gavlfjorden and the Andfjorden, and the Risøysundet strait separates the two main islands in Andøy. The Andøy Bridge connects the two islands.

The highest point in the municipality is the 889.18-metre (2,917.3 ft) tall mountain Skrivartinden. The midsection of the island consists of bogs and marshes, known for their Arctic cloudberries. There are numerous lakes on the island including Bleiksvatnet and Skogvollvatnet. The island is also the only place in continental Norway where coal and fossils from dinosaurs are found. Forfjorddalen nature reserve on Hinnøya has some of the oldest pine trees in Scandinavia, some more than 700 years old.

=== Birdlife ===
Lying furthest north in the area known as Vesterålen, Andøy is a mixture of vast areas of marshland fens, with a backdrop of high peaked mountains such as Kvasstinden. The coast is famous for its sheltered bays with white sandy shores. The area has a rich bird life and this is reflected in some good birding localities like Forfjorddalen Nature Reserve and Skogvoll, the latter a Ramsar site of international importance.

The bird cliff at Bleiksøya, outside of Bleik, is a spectacular and photogenic landmark outside the northern part of Andøya, with many species of seabirds including puffin.

=== Climate ===
Andøya has a subpolar oceanic climate (Cfc).

Climate data for Andenes 1991-2020 (10 m, extremes 1958-2025)
Month	Jan	Feb	Mar	Apr	May	Jun	Jul	Aug	Sep	Oct	Nov	Dec	Year
Record high °C (°F)	9.0 (48.2)	9.5 (49.1)	9.6 (49.3)	15.1 (59.2)	22.5 (72.5)	27.2 (81.0)	27.6 (81.7)	25.7 (78.3)	22.0 (71.6)	16.6 (61.9)	14 (57)	10.5 (50.9)	27.6 (81.7)
Mean daily maximum °C (°F)	1.2 (34.2)	0.7 (33.3)	1.5 (34.7)	4.2 (39.6)	8.3 (46.9)	11.1 (52.0)	14 (57)	13.9 (57.0)	11.1 (52.0)	6.7 (44.1)	3.8 (38.8)	2.1 (35.8)	6.6 (43.8)
Daily mean °C (°F)	−0.9 (30.4)	−1.4 (29.5)	−0.6 (30.9)	2 (36)	5.9 (42.6)	8.9 (48.0)	11.6 (52.9)	11.6 (52.9)	8.8 (47.8)	4.7 (40.5)	1.7 (35.1)	0.2 (32.4)	4.4 (39.9)
Mean daily minimum °C (°F)	−3.4 (25.9)	−4 (25)	−3.3 (26.1)	−0.9 (30.4)	3.1 (37.6)	6.7 (44.1)	9.3 (48.7)	9.1 (48.4)	6.2 (43.2)	2.4 (36.3)	−0.3 (31.5)	−2.3 (27.9)	1.9 (35.4)
Record low °C (°F)	−19.9 (−3.8)	−18.4 (−1.1)	−19.8 (−3.6)	−13.6 (7.5)	−10.5 (13.1)	−1.1 (30.0)	0.6 (33.1)	0.5 (32.9)	−4.2 (24.4)	−11.0 (12.2)	−14.1 (6.6)	−17.4 (0.7)	−19.9 (−3.8)
Average precipitation mm (inches)	118.2 (4.65)	102.7 (4.04)	88.4 (3.48)	74.7 (2.94)	59.2 (2.33)	52.5 (2.07)	66.4 (2.61)	75.6 (2.98)	110.9 (4.37)	146.0 (5.75)	107.8 (4.24)	119.1 (4.69)	1,122.1 (44.18)
Source: yr.no/Météo Climat

Climate data for Andøya 1961-1990
Month	Jan	Feb	Mar	Apr	May	Jun	Jul	Aug	Sep	Oct	Nov	Dec	Year
Mean daily maximum °C (°F)	0.3 (32.5)	0.1 (32.2)	0.8 (33.4)	3.3 (37.9)	7.5 (45.5)	11.1 (52.0)	13.5 (56.3)	13.3 (55.9)	10.0 (50.0)	6.2 (43.2)	2.8 (37.0)	1.1 (34.0)	5.8 (42.4)
Daily mean °C (°F)	−2.1 (28.2)	−2.2 (28.0)	−1.4 (29.5)	1.1 (34.0)	5.2 (41.4)	8.5 (47.3)	11.0 (51.8)	11.0 (51.8)	7.8 (46.0)	4.2 (39.6)	0.9 (33.6)	−1.2 (29.8)	3.6 (38.5)
Mean daily minimum °C (°F)	−5.1 (22.8)	−5.2 (22.6)	−4.4 (24.1)	−1.8 (28.8)	2.5 (36.5)	6.2 (43.2)	8.7 (47.7)	8.3 (46.9)	5.2 (41.4)	1.7 (35.1)	−1.7 (28.9)	−4.0 (24.8)	0.9 (33.6)
Average precipitation mm (inches)	98 (3.9)	86 (3.4)	79 (3.1)	68 (2.7)	53 (2.1)	61 (2.4)	67 (2.6)	77 (3.0)	108 (4.3)	144 (5.7)	109 (4.3)	110 (4.3)	1,060 (41.7)
Average precipitation days (≥ 1 mm)	15.3	13.1	13.5	13.1	10.6	11.8	12.1	12.8	16.6	19.2	17.0	17.4	172.5
Source: Norwegian Meteorological Institute

== Government ==
Andøy Municipality is responsible for primary education (through 10th grade), outpatient health services, senior citizen services, welfare and other social services, zoning, economic development, and municipal roads and utilities. The municipality is governed by a municipal council of directly elected representatives. The mayor is indirectly elected by a vote of the municipal council. The municipality is under the jurisdiction of the Midtre Hålogaland District Court and the Hålogaland Court of Appeal.

=== Municipal council ===
The municipal council (Kommunestyre) of Andøy Municipality is made up of 23 representatives that are elected to four year terms. The tables below show the current and historical composition of the council by political party.

Andøy kommunestyre 2023–2027
Party name (in Norwegian)	Number of representatives
Labour Party (Arbeiderpartiet)	8
Progress Party (Fremskrittspartiet)	2
Green Party (Miljøpartiet De Grønne)	1
Conservative Party (Høyre)	5
Centre Party (Senterpartiet)	3
Socialist Left Party (Sosialistisk Venstreparti)	3
Liberal Party (Venstre)	1
Total number of members:	23

Andøy kommunestyre 2019–2023
Party name (in Norwegian)	Number of representatives
Labour Party (Arbeiderpartiet)	3
Progress Party (Fremskrittspartiet)	1
Green Party (Miljøpartiet De Grønne)	2
Conservative Party (Høyre)	1
Centre Party (Senterpartiet)	14
Socialist Left Party (Sosialistisk Venstreparti)	2
Total number of members:	23

Andøy kommunestyre 2015–2019
Party name (in Norwegian)	Number of representatives
Labour Party (Arbeiderpartiet)	5
Progress Party (Fremskrittspartiet)	2
Green Party (Miljøpartiet De Grønne)	1
Conservative Party (Høyre)	9
Christian Democratic Party (Kristelig Folkeparti)	1
Centre Party (Senterpartiet)	2
Liberal Party (Venstre)	1
Andøy List (Andøylista)	2
Total number of members:	23

Andøy kommunestyre 2011–2015
Party name (in Norwegian)	Number of representatives
Labour Party (Arbeiderpartiet)	5
Progress Party (Fremskrittspartiet)	2
Conservative Party (Høyre)	9
Christian Democratic Party (Kristelig Folkeparti)	1
Centre Party (Senterpartiet)	2
Liberal Party (Venstre)	1
Andøy List (Andøylista)	3
Total number of members:	23

Andøy kommunestyre 2007–2011
Party name (in Norwegian)	Number of representatives
Labour Party (Arbeiderpartiet)	6
Progress Party (Fremskrittspartiet)	2
Conservative Party (Høyre)	9
Christian Democratic Party (Kristelig Folkeparti)	1
Centre Party (Senterpartiet)	3
Socialist Left Party (Sosialistisk Venstreparti)	1
Liberal Party (Venstre)	1
Total number of members:	23

Andøy kommunestyre 2003–2007
Party name (in Norwegian)	Number of representatives
Labour Party (Arbeiderpartiet)	5
Progress Party (Fremskrittspartiet)	2
Conservative Party (Høyre)	10
Christian Democratic Party (Kristelig Folkeparti)	1
Centre Party (Senterpartiet)	2
Socialist Left Party (Sosialistisk Venstreparti)	2
Liberal Party (Venstre)	1
Total number of members:	23

Andøy kommunestyre 1999–2003
Party name (in Norwegian)	Number of representatives
Labour Party (Arbeiderpartiet)	7
Progress Party (Fremskrittspartiet)	4
Conservative Party (Høyre)	11
Christian Democratic Party (Kristelig Folkeparti)	2
Centre Party (Senterpartiet)	7
Socialist Left Party (Sosialistisk Venstreparti)	2
Liberal Party (Venstre)	4
Total number of members:	37

Andøy kommunestyre 1995–1999
Party name (in Norwegian)	Number of representatives
Labour Party (Arbeiderpartiet)	13
Progress Party (Fremskrittspartiet)	2
Conservative Party (Høyre)	8
Centre Party (Senterpartiet)	7
Socialist Left Party (Sosialistisk Venstreparti)	2
Liberal Party (Venstre)	5
Total number of members:	37

Andøy kommunestyre 1991–1995
Party name (in Norwegian)	Number of representatives
Labour Party (Arbeiderpartiet)	10
Progress Party (Fremskrittspartiet)	1
Conservative Party (Høyre)	13
Centre Party (Senterpartiet)	6
Socialist Left Party (Sosialistisk Venstreparti)	4
Liberal Party (Venstre)	3
Total number of members:	37

Andøy kommunestyre 1987–1991
Party name (in Norwegian)	Number of representatives
Labour Party (Arbeiderpartiet)	14
Conservative Party (Høyre)	14
Christian Democratic Party (Kristelig Folkeparti)	1
Centre Party (Senterpartiet)	2
Socialist Left Party (Sosialistisk Venstreparti)	3
Liberal Party (Venstre)	3
Total number of members:	37

Andøy kommunestyre 1983–1987
Party name (in Norwegian)	Number of representatives
Labour Party (Arbeiderpartiet)	15
Conservative Party (Høyre)	12
Christian Democratic Party (Kristelig Folkeparti)	2
Centre Party (Senterpartiet)	2
Socialist Left Party (Sosialistisk Venstreparti)	2
Liberal Party (Venstre)	3
Free Voters' List (Frie Velgeres liste)	1
Total number of members:	37

Andøy kommunestyre 1979–1983
Party name (in Norwegian)	Number of representatives
Labour Party (Arbeiderpartiet)	11
Conservative Party (Høyre)	12
Christian Democratic Party (Kristelig Folkeparti)	3
Centre Party (Senterpartiet)	3
Socialist Left Party (Sosialistisk Venstreparti)	1
Liberal Party (Venstre)	4
Andenes Non-party List (Andenes Upolitiske Liste)	1
Free Voters' List (Frie Velgeres Liste)	2
Total number of members:	37

Andøy kommunestyre 1975–1979
Party name (in Norwegian)	Number of representatives
Labour Party (Arbeiderpartiet)	12
Conservative Party (Høyre)	7
Christian Democratic Party (Kristelig Folkeparti)	3
Centre Party (Senterpartiet)	4
Socialist Left Party (Sosialistisk Venstreparti)	1
Liberal Party (Venstre)	5
Andenes Non-party List (Andenes Upolitiske Liste)	3
Free Voters' List (Frie Velgeres Liste)	2
Total number of members:	37

Andøy kommunestyre 1971–1975
Party name (in Norwegian)	Number of representatives
Labour Party (Arbeiderpartiet)	14
Conservative Party (Høyre)	7
Centre Party (Senterpartiet)	5
Liberal Party (Venstre)	4
Local List(s) (Lokale lister)	7
Total number of members:	37

Andøy kommunestyre 1967–1971
Party name (in Norwegian)	Number of representatives
Labour Party (Arbeiderpartiet)	15
Conservative Party (Høyre)	5
Christian Democratic Party (Kristelig Folkeparti)	1
Centre Party (Senterpartiet)	2
Liberal Party (Venstre)	9
Local List(s) (Lokale lister)	5
Total number of members:	37

Andøy kommunestyre 1964–1967
Party name (in Norwegian)	Number of representatives
Labour Party (Arbeiderpartiet)	11
List of workers, fishermen, and small farmholders (Arbeidere, fiskere, småbrukere liste)	11
Local List(s) (Lokale lister)	15
Total number of members:	37
Note: On 1 January 1964, Andøy Municipality was created upon the merger of Andenes Municipality, Bjørnskinn Municipality, and Dverberg Municipality.

=== Mayors ===
The mayor (Norwegian: ordfører) of Andøy Municipality is the political leader of the municipality and the chairperson of the municipal council. Here is a list of people who have held this position:

- 1964–1964: Anton P. Medby
- 1964–1966: Knut Bolstad
- 1966–1967: Johan Kleppe (V)
- 1968–1973: Harold Nicolaisen (H)
- 1974–1975: Ole Benjaminsen (H)
- 1976–1979: Johan Kleppe (V)
- 1980–1995: Leif A. Iversen (H)
- 1995–1999: Kjell-Are Johansen (Ap)
- 1999–2019: Jonni Helge Solsvik (H)
- 2019–2023: Knut Andreas Nordmo (Sp)
- 2023–present: Kjell-Are Johansen (Ap)

== Transportation ==
The Hurtigruten boat stops at Risøyhamn in Andøy. Andøya Airport at Andenes is served by Widerøe airlines. During the summer, Andenes is connected to Gryllefjord on the island of Senja by the Andenes–Gryllefjord Ferry. By car, you reach Andøy on Norwegian County Road 82, northbound from Sortland.

== Military ==
Andøya Air Station is located next to Andenes. It is the home of the 333rd Squadron of the Royal Norwegian Air Force and houses all P-3 Orion maritime patrol aircraft in the Norwegian Armed Forces.

== Notable people ==
- Torbjørn Bratt (ca.1502 in Andenes – 1548), a clergyman who was the first Bishop of Trondheim
- Helmer Hanssen (1870 in Bjørnskinn – 1956), a sailor, pilot, and polar explorer who was one of the first five explorers to reach the South Pole with Roald Amundsen
- Nanna With (1874 in Andenes – 1965), a journalist and voice pedagogue
- Torstein Raaby (1918 in Dverberg – 1964), a telegrapher, resistance fighter, explorer, and crew member on the Kon-Tiki expedition
- Finn Myrvang (born 1937 in Bjørnskinn), a historian, folklore collector, and academic
- Nick Borgen (born 1952 in Andenes), a Norwegian–Swedish musician, singer, and writer
