= Bjørnskinn =

Village in Andøy Municipality, Norway

- Village
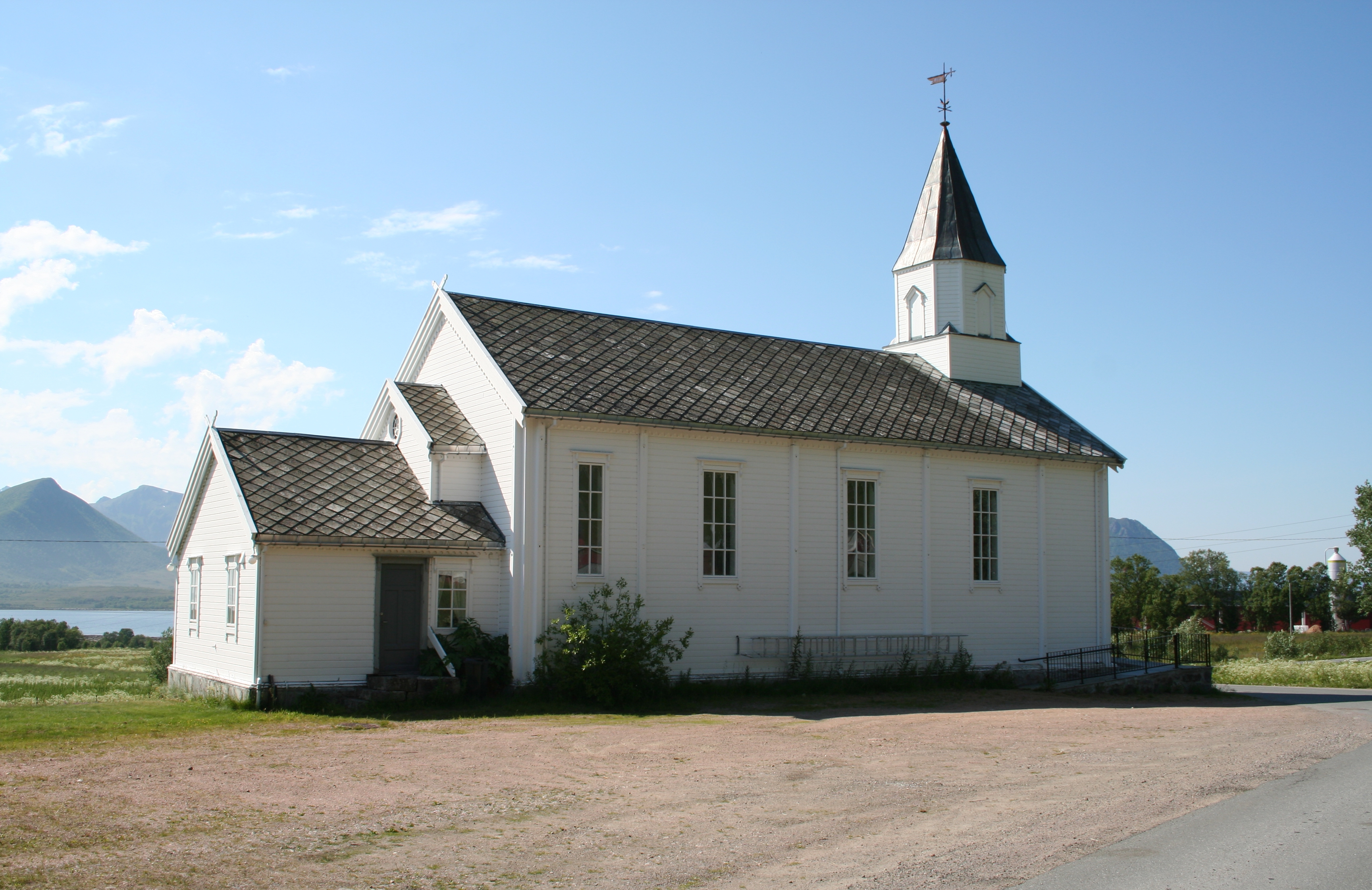
- View of the local church
- Interactive map of Bjørnskinn
- Location within Nordland Location within Norway
- Coordinates: 69°00′02″N 15°37′46″E
- Country: Norway
- Region: Northern Norway
- County: Nordland
- District: Vesterålen
- Municipality: Andøy Municipality
- Elevation: 26 m (85 ft)
- Time zone: UTC+01:00 (CET)
  - Summer (DST): UTC+02:00 (CEST)
- Post Code: 8484 Risøyhamn

Bjørnskinn is a village in Andøy Municipality in Nordland county, Norway. The village of Bjørnskinn lies along the southern part of the island of Andøya, about 2 kilometres (1.2 mi) northwest of the larger village of Risøyhamn. The village is the site of Bjørnskinn Church which serves the southern part of Andøy Municipality.

== History ==
The village was the administrative centre of the old Bjørnskinn Municipality which existed from 1924 until its dissolution in 1964.

== Notable residents ==
Notable people that were born or lived in Bjørnskinn include:

- Helmer Hanssen (1870–1956), a Polar explorer who was on the expedition of Roald Amundsen to the South Pole
- Johan Kleppe, a member of Norwegian Parliament from Nordland (1969–1973) and defense minister in Korvald's Cabinet (1972–1973)
- Finn Myrvang (born 1937), a historian
- Augustinus Johannessøn Sellevold (1803–1893), a fisherman-farmer who was twice elected as member of the Norwegian Parliament from Nordland (1845–1848)
