= Dverberg =

Village in Andøy Municipality, Norway

Dverberg: Dverberg (Norwegian); Dearka (Northern Sami); Myre (Norwegian)
- Village
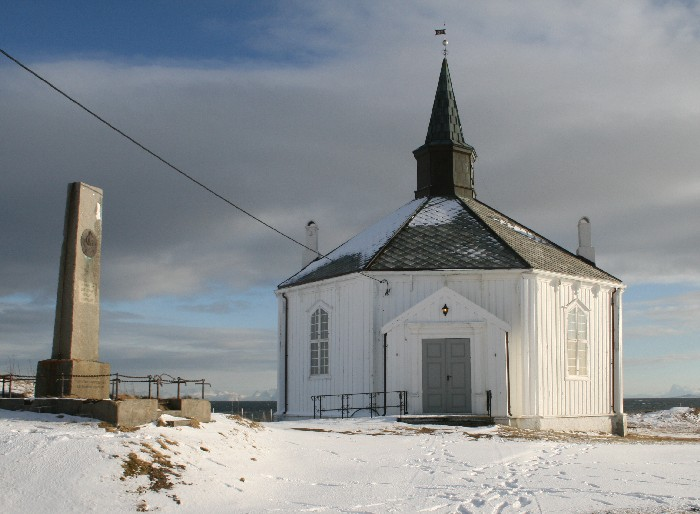
- View of the village
- Interactive map of Dverberg
- Location within Nordland Location within Norway
- Coordinates: 69.1064°N 15.9640°E
- Country: Norway
- Region: Northern Norway
- County: Nordland
- District: Vesterålen
- Municipality: Andøy Municipality
- Elevation: 6 m (20 ft)
- Time zone: UTC+01:00 (CET)
  - Summer (DST): UTC+02:00 (CEST)
- Post Code: 8485 Dverberg

Dverberg or Myre (Norwegian) or Dearka (Northern Sami) is a small village in Andøy Municipality in Nordland county, Norway. It is located on the east coast of the island of Andøya, along the Andfjorden, about 30 kilometres (19 mi) south of the large village of Andenes. Dverberg Church is a wooden, octagonal church built in 1843, located on the north end of the village.

As of 2010, the village of Dverberg/Myre had around 250 inhabitants.

== Notable residents ==
- Torstein Raaby (1918-1964), a Norwegian resistance fighter and explorer
