= Finn Myrvang =

- Born: June 20, 1937 (age 88); Bjørnskinn, Andøy, Norway
- Occupation: Historian
- Awards: King's Medal of Merit

Finn Myrvang (born June 20, 1937) is a Norwegian historian, folklore collector, and associate professor.

Myrvang was born in at Bjørnskinn in Andøy Municipality, Nordland county. Until 2004 he headed the Place Name Project in Nordland, which has registered over 180,000 place names in Nordland. He has been a place name consultant for the Language Council of Norway and the Norwegian Mapping and Cadastre Authority. Myrvang has also published historical articles on Northern Norway, especially Hålogaland. He has also published several books on folklore and place names.

== Awards ==
- 1983: Municipality of Andøy Cultural Award
- 1984: Blix Prize
- 1991: Municipality of Bø Cultural Award
- 1996: Vesterål Museum Cultural Preservation Award
- 2004: Norwegian Association of Local and Regional Authorities Medal of Merit
- 2015: King's Medal of Merit
