= Torstein Raaby =

Norwegian explorer

- Born: October 6, 1918; Dverberg, Vesterålen
- Died: March 23, 1964 (aged 45); Greenland
- Occupations: Radio operator Resistance fighter
- Known for: Crew member on the Kon-Tiki

Torstein Pettersen Raaby (6 October 1918 – 23 March 1964) was a Norwegian telegrapher, resistance fighter and explorer. He is known as a crew member on the Kon-Tiki expedition.

== Biography ==
Raaby was born in the village of Dverberg on the island of Andøya in Nordland, Norway.

During World War II he became a Secret Intelligence Service officer, having entered training in 1943. He spent ten months in hiding in the village of Alta, sending detailed reports on German warships and their radar installations to England via a hidden radio set surreptitiously connected to the antenna of a German officer. His reports were instrumental helping the RAF to find and permanently disable the battleship Tirpitz. For that and other undercover operations during the war, Raaby was awarded Norway's highest decoration for military gallantry, the War Cross with sword in 1944 and the British DSO. Raaby held the rank of Second Lieutenant (Fenrik).

== Kon-Tiki expedition and later years ==
In 1947, he took part in Thor Heyerdahl's Kon-Tiki expedition from Peru to Polynesia as a radio operator, exchanging frequent messages with amateur radio enthusiasts in Chile, the United States, and even Norway, on a tiny 6-watt transmitter.

After the expedition he returned to northern Norway, until he, again as a radio operator, lived on the remote Bear Island, far north of the Arctic Circle. From 1959 to 1961 he was a station controller of the radio station on the Arctic island of Jan Mayen.

Raaby died near Alert, Nunavut of a heart condition while in route on an expedition to reach the North Pole on skis.

Torstein Raaby is buried at his birthplace of Dverberg on Andøya.

== Honours and awards ==
- War Cross with sword (Norway)
- Distinguished Service Order (United Kingdom)
- King's Medal for Courage in the Cause of Freedom (United Kingdom)
- Croix de Guerre 1939-1945 (France)
