= Risøyhamn =

Village in Andøy Municipality, Norway

- Village
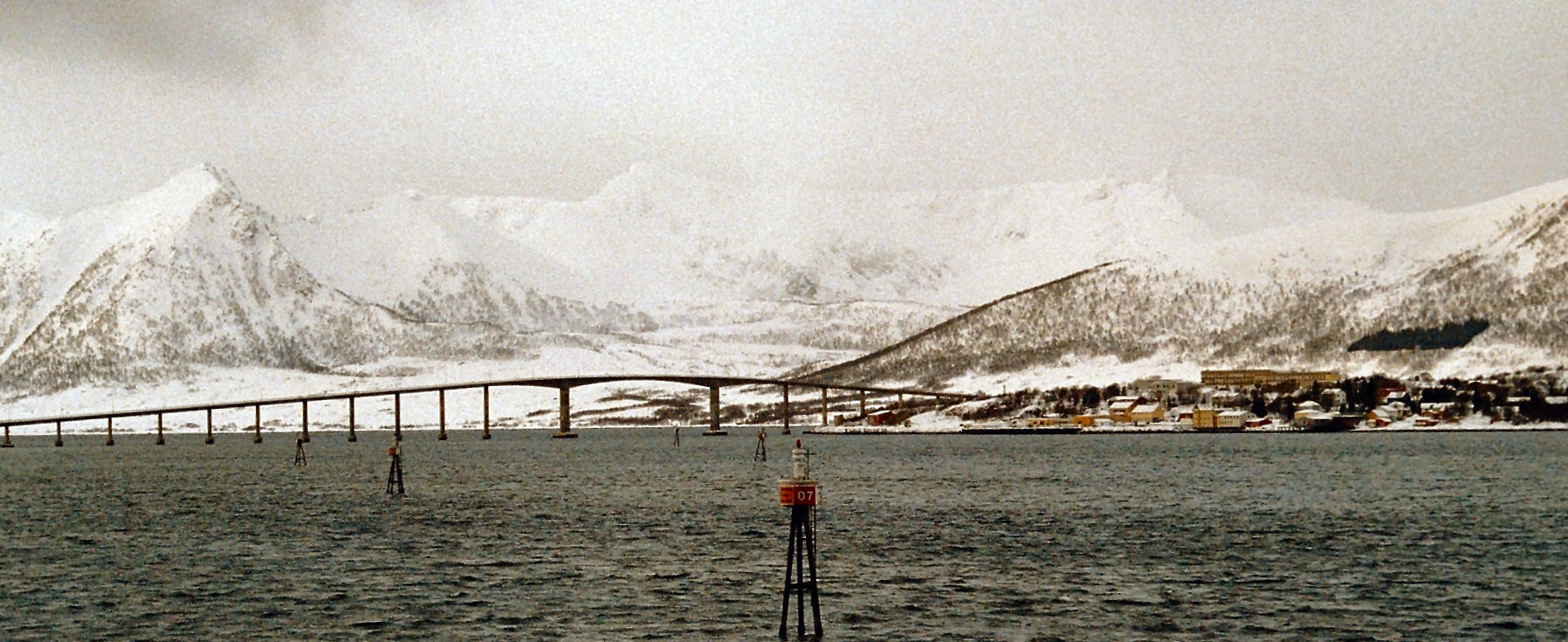
- View of the village
- Interactive map of Risøyhamn
- Location within Nordland Location within Norway
- Coordinates: 68.9719°N 15.6381°E
- Country: Norway
- Region: Northern Norway
- County: Nordland
- District: Vesterålen
- Municipality: Andøy Municipality

Area
  - Total: 0.28 km^{2} (0.11 sq mi)
- Elevation: 4 m (13 ft)

Population (2018)
  - Total: 216
  - Density: 771/km^{2} (2,000/sq mi)
- Time zone: UTC+01:00 (CET)
  - Summer (DST): UTC+02:00 (CEST)
- Post Code: 8484 Risøyhamn

Risøyhamn is a village in Andøy Municipality in Nordland county, Norway. The village is located on the southern part of the island of Andøya. The island of Andøya is connected to the neighboring island of Hinnøya by the Andøy Bridge at Risøyhamn. The Hurtigruten coastal express boat has service to and from Risøyhamn twice a day.

The 0.28-square-kilometre (69-acre) village had a population (2018) of 216 and a population density of 771 inhabitants per square kilometre (2,000/sq mi). Since 2018, the population and area data for this village area has not been separately tracked by Statistics Norway.
