= Abbot's Kitchen =

Abbot's Kitchen may refer to:

- Abbot's Kitchen, Glastonbury, Somerset, England
- Abbot's Kitchen, Oxford, Oxfordshire, England
