= List of octagonal buildings and structures =

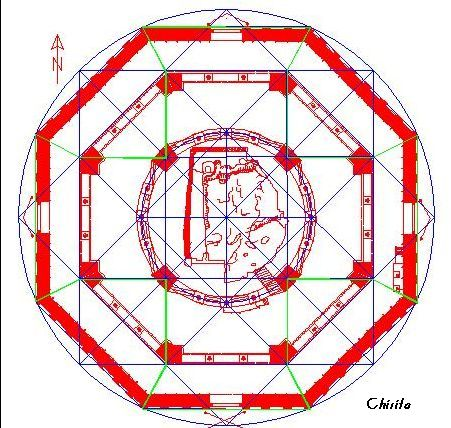
Plan of the Dome of the Rock in Jerusalem

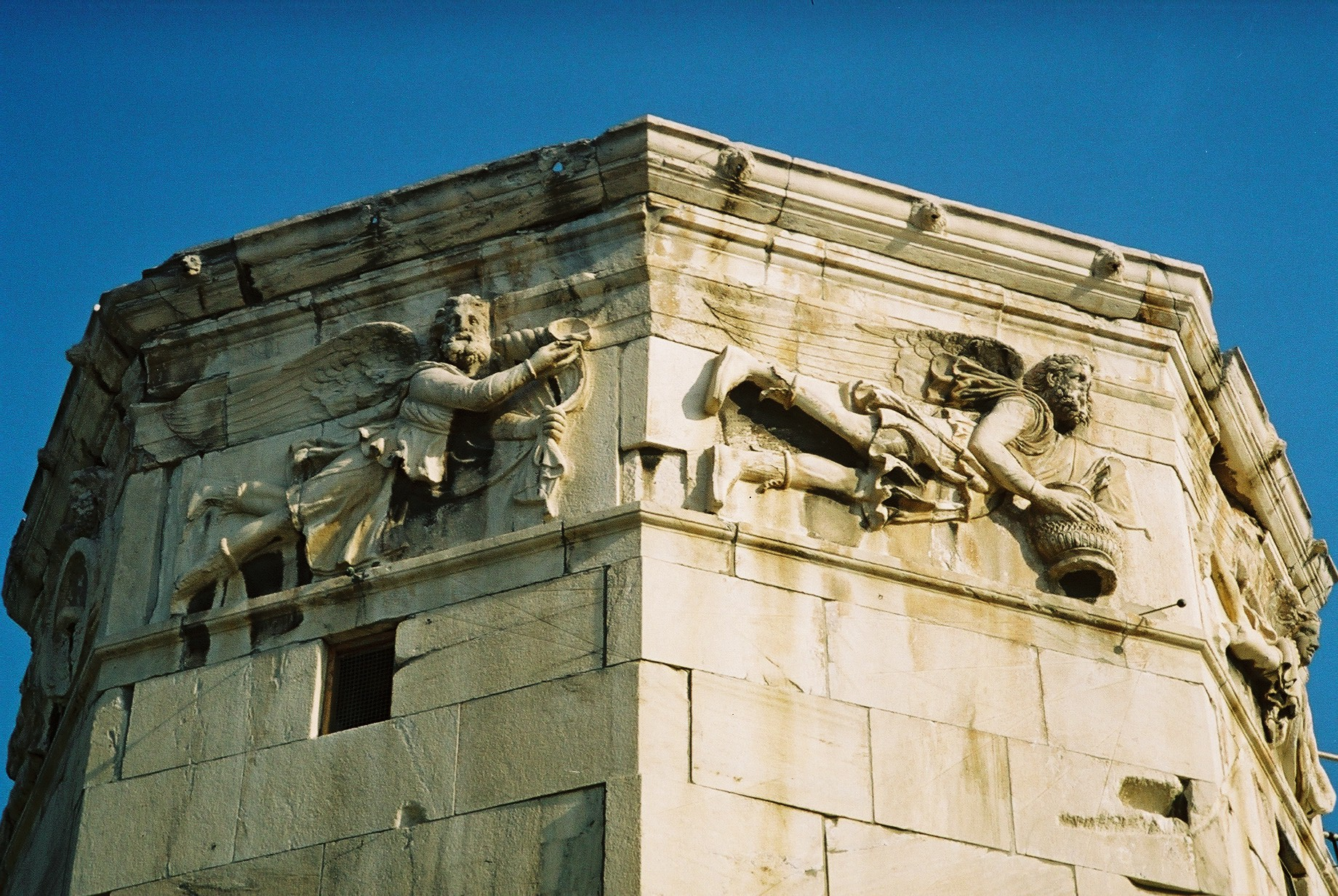
The Tower of the Winds in Athens

Octagon buildings and structures are characterized by an octagonal plan form, whether a perfect geometric octagon or a regular eight-sided polygon with approximately equal sides.

The oldest surviving octagon-shaped building is the Tower of the Winds in Athens, Greece, which was constructed circa 50 B.C.; the Pharos also had octagonal design elements but no longer stands. Octagon houses were popularized in the United States in the mid-19th century and there are too many to list here, see instead the list of octagon houses. There are also octagonal houses built in other times and cultures.

Below is a list of octagonal buildings and structures worldwide, excluding houses and windmills.

== Australia ==
- The office pods of the Callam Offices in Canberra
- Chinaman's Hat an octagonal gazebo-like structure in the South Channel of Port Phillip Bay
- The Octagon Theatre at the University of Western Australia.
- The old site of Hotel Saville in South Yarra, Melbourne, now unofficially referred to as The Blocktagon, which was renovated into a residential dwelling made up of six octagonal apartments during the eleventh season of reality show The Block.
- Nauru House 80 Collins Street, Melbourne
- Sancta Sophia College within The University of Sydney. Referred to as the octagon or informally ‘octa’

== Canada ==
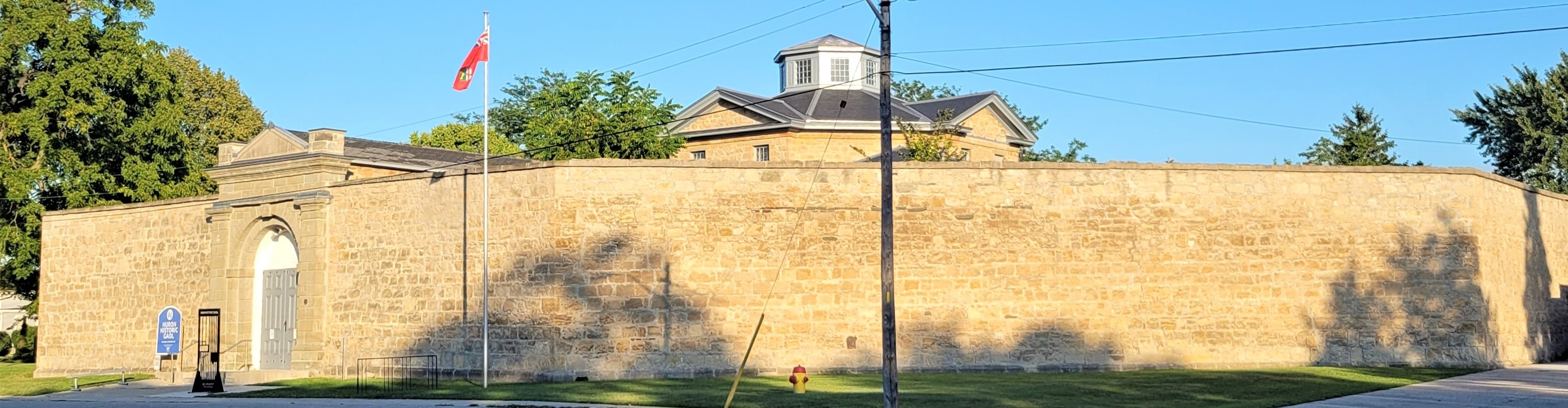
Huron Historic Gaol

At least 19 historic octagon houses are known to exist in Canada distributed across 4 eastern provinces. For a list of these houses, See: List of octagon houses. In Canada, the octagon house craze also engendered an octagonal deadhouse phenomenon. This included octagonal deadhouses, pre-burial edifices, built in the mid to late 1800s along Yonge Street in south-central Ontario, from just north of Toronto to Aurora.

- Bastion Nanaimo, British Columbia
- Chapel at Dundurn, Hamilton, Ontario
- Miscou Island Lighthouse – strategic Baie des Chaleurs octagonal colonial lighthouse
- Huron County Gaol – distinctive octagonal jail design, 1839–41
- Pachena Point Light on Vancouver Island, British Columbia
- Speedside United Church, in Centre Wellington, Ontario

== China ==
- Liaodi Pagoda, China (1000s)
- Lingxiao Pagoda, China (860)
- Also many other pagodas

== Egypt ==
- Lighthouse of Alexandria
- Pharos of Abusir
- The Octagon

== Ethiopia ==
- St. George's Cathedral, Addis Ababa

== Germany ==
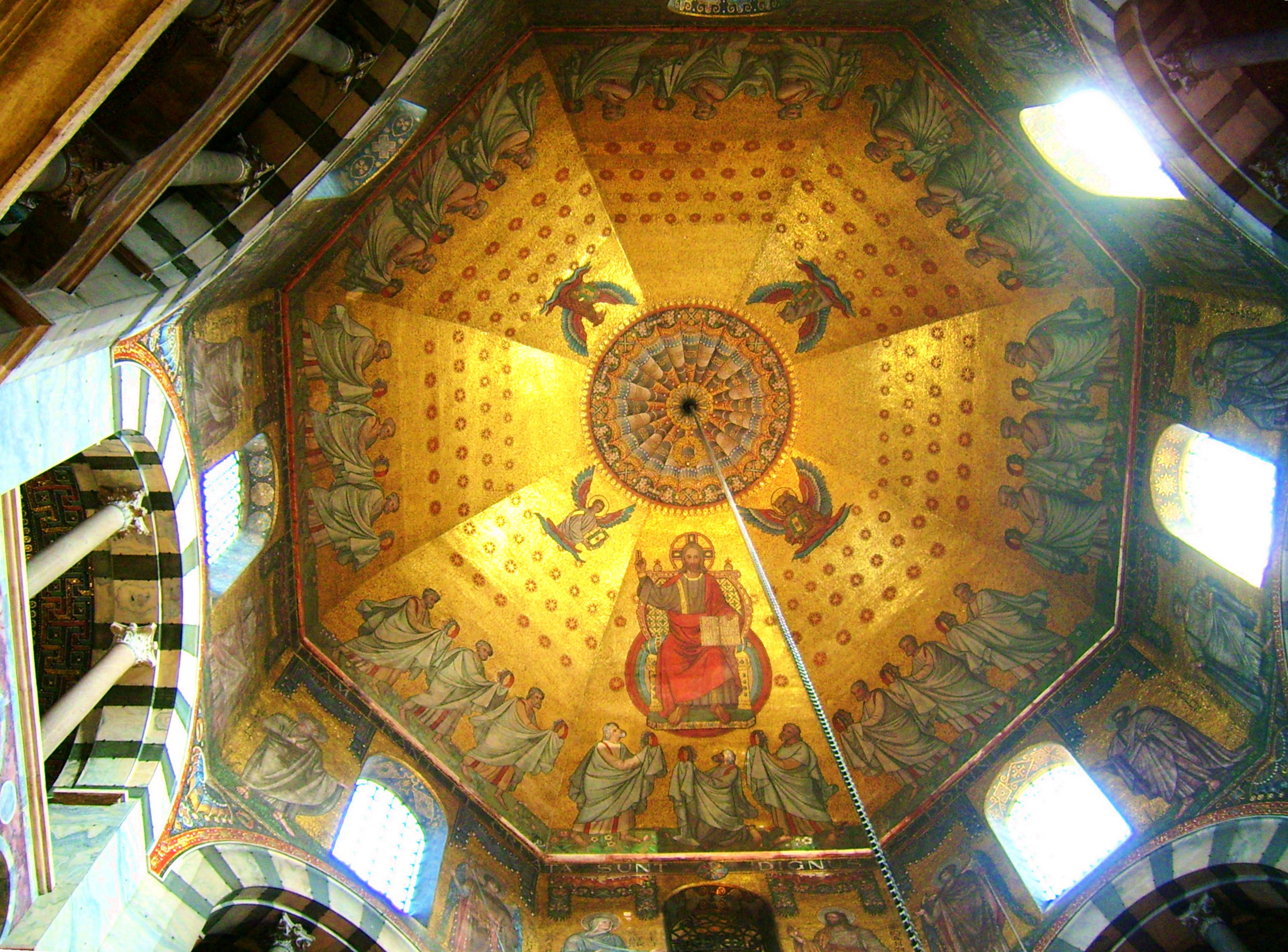
Ceiling of the Palatine Chapel in Aachen

- Palatine Chapel in Aachen, built c. 972
- Dragon House, 1870 garden folly, Sanssouci Park, Potsdam, Germany
- Kaiser Wilhelm Memorial Church, built 1961

== Greece ==
- Tower of the Winds, Athens, Greece

== Hungary ==
- Rumbach Street synagogue, Budapest

== India ==
- Satyagnana Sabha, Vadalur, Vadalur, Tamil Nadu

== Iran ==
- Ferdows Religious School, Toon
- Jabalieh

== Palestine ==
- Dome of the Rock, Jerusalem. 687-691 CE
- Chapel of the Ascension, Jerusalem c. 382 CE by Saint Helena; original octagonal shrine has been reconstructed multiple times.

== Italy ==
- Octagonal Hall, Baths of Diocletian (300), Rome
- Lateran Baptistery (440), Rome
- The Baptistery (5th century), Albenga
- Baptistery of San Giovanni, Florence (1059)
- The Battistero or Baptistery of Parma (1196)
- Basilica of San Vitale, Ravenna (547)
- Castel del Monte (Apulia), Andria (BT) (1240s)
- Church of St. Giacomo, Vicovaro (1400s)
- Tribuna of the Uffizi, Florence (1584)

== Japan ==
- Yumedono at Hōryū-ji, Ikaruga (739)
- Octagonal Hall of Eisan-ji, Gojō (760-764)
- Hokuendō of Kōfuku-ji, Nara (1210)
- Saiendō of Hōryū-ji, Ikaruga (1250)
- Main Hall of Keikyuin of Kōryū-ji, Kyoto (1251)
- Three-Story Pagoda of Anraku-ji, Ueda (1290s)
- Aizendō of Tōfuku-ji, Kyoto (1333-92)
- Main Hall of Busshō-ji, Mito (1585)
- Nanendō of Kōfuku-ji, Nara (1789)
- Nippon Budokan, Tokyo (1964)
- Pagoda of Genjo Sanzoin Complex in Yakushi-ji, Nara (1991)
- Sugamo Ohdai Kannondō in Taisho University, Tokyo (2013)

== New Zealand ==
- The Octagon, the former Trinity Congregational Church in Christchurch, New Zealand

== Norway ==
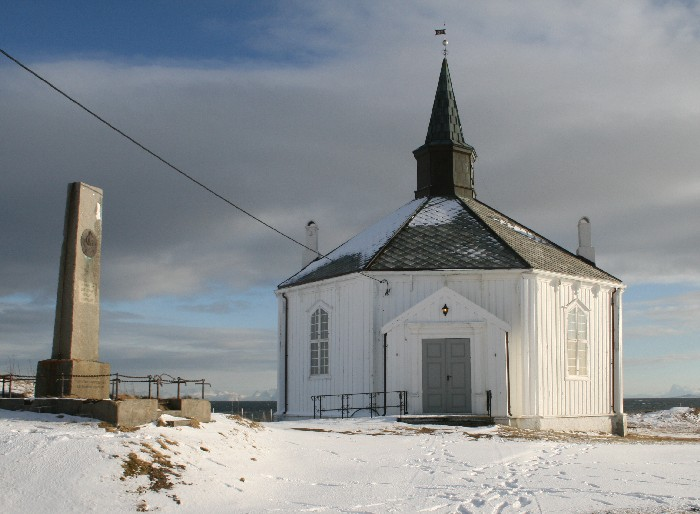
Dverberg Church with memorial for fishermen who lost their lives at sea

- Ankenes Church
- Bardu Church
- Buvik Church
- Dolstad Church, mixed octagonal-cruciform
- Klæbu Church
- Røssvoll Church
- Støren Church
- Trinity Church (Oslo), octagonal-cruciform combined
- Vinje Church (Hemne)

== Portugal ==
- Convent of Christ (Tomar, Portugal), 12th-15th Century. The adjacent chapel is only one of two octagonal chapels in the world. The other is in Jerusalem.
- Charola, Portuguese Info on the Chapel of the Convent of Christ.

== Singapore ==
- Lau Pa Sat, a dining hall and market

== Spain ==
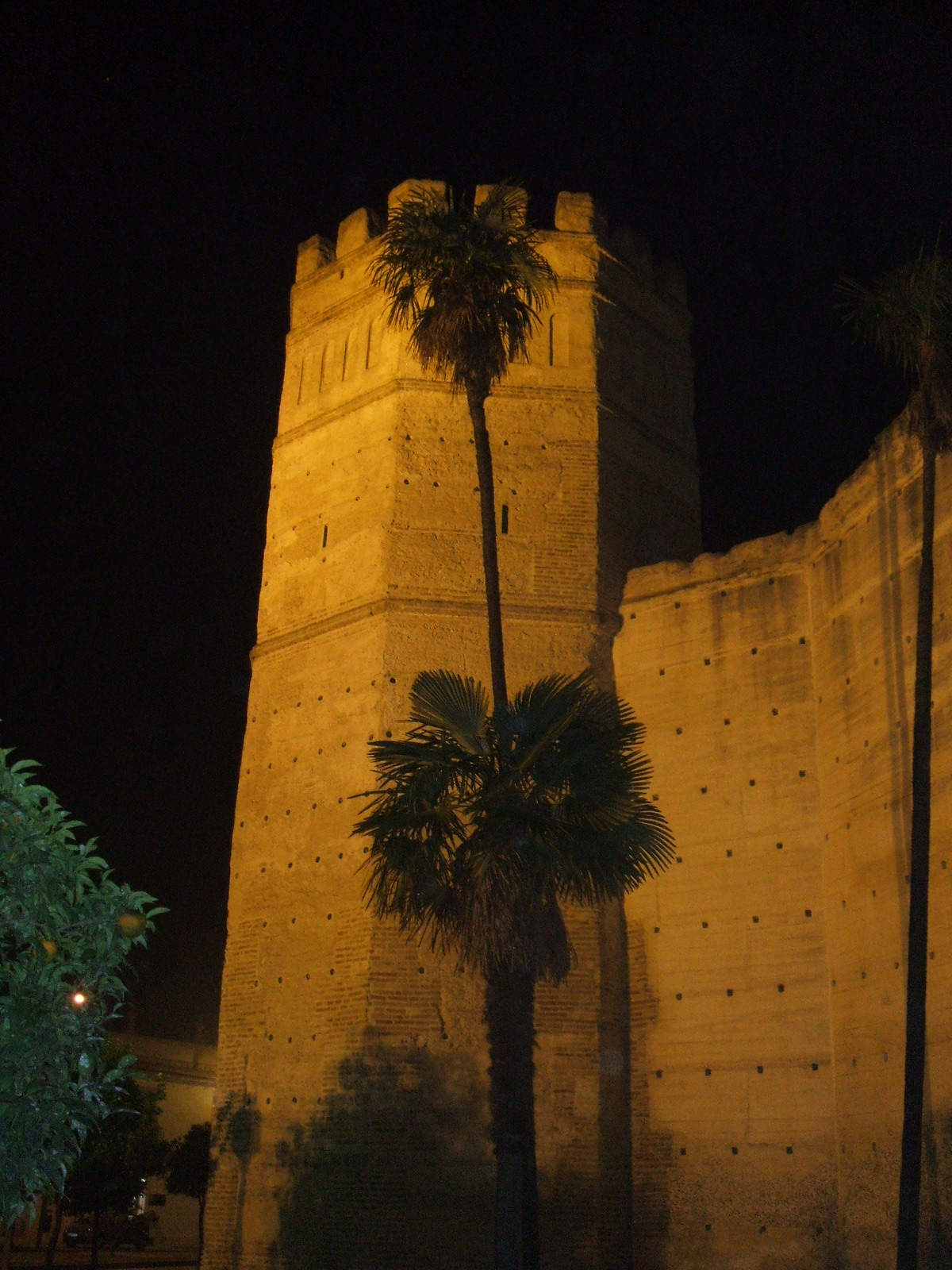
View of the Octagonal Tower at the Alcazar in Jerez

- Alcazar of Jerez de la Frontera has an Octagonal Tower, in Almohad style
- El Micalet is the bell tower of Valencia Cathedral.

== Sri Lanka ==
- Temple of the Tooth

== Sweden ==
- Hedvig Eleonora Church, Stockholm (1737)

== United Kingdom ==
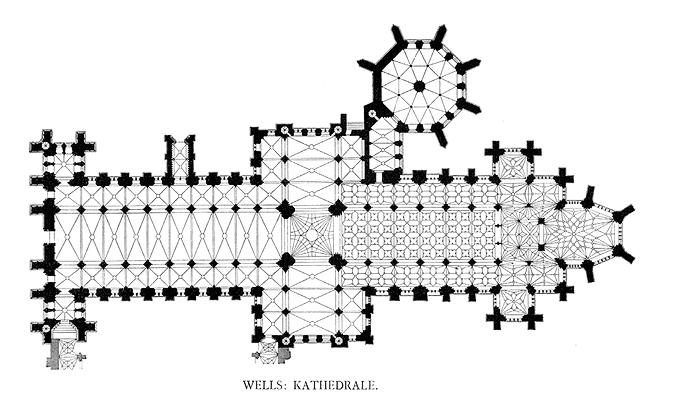
Wells Cathedral plan, showing the octagonal chapter house (top)

- Abbot's Kitchen, Glastonbury
- Abbot's Kitchen, Oxford
- Avenue Methodist Church in Sale, Greater Manchester
- Dutch Cottage, Rayleigh, Essex
- Eighteenth century replicas of the Athenian Tower of the Winds in the ornamental gardens of the following stately homes:
  - Mount Stewart
  - Shugborough Hall
  - West Wycombe Park
- Jubilee Tower, Lancashire
- Naze tower, Walton on the Naze
- Octagon, Birmingham the world's tallest octagonal residential skyscraper.
- Octagonal chapter houses at the following cathedrals:
  - Liverpool Cathedral
  - Salisbury Cathedral
  - Southwell Minster
  - Truro Cathedral
  - Wells Cathedral
  - York Minster
- Octagon Centre, Sheffield
- Octagonal lantern tower, Ely Cathedral, Ely
- Octagon Chapel, Norwich
- Octagon Temple at Cliveden
- Orthodox Church of the Holy Trinity & Annunciation, Oxford. "Oxford : The Orthodox Church of the Holy Trinity and the Annunciation".
- Dreghorn & Springside Parish Church
- St James Church, Teignmouth
- Great Pagoda, Kew Gardens, London
- Storm Tower at Compass Point, Bude, Cornwall
- St. John’s Methodist Church, Arbroath
- United Reformed Church in Cheadle Hulme
- The main tower of Hadlow Castle, Kent
- The Butter Market, Barnard Castle, County Durham
- Hertford College's Middle Common Room, Oxford
- Octagonal Tower, Cardiff Castle, Cardiff, built by Robert Beauchamp 1425
- Octagonal drawing room, Castell Coch, Tongwynlais, Cardiff, built by William Burges for John Crichton-Stuart, 3rd Marquess of Bute, 1870s
- All seven towers of Caernarfon Castle, Caernarfon, built by James of St George for Edward I, late thirteenth century
- Porth-y-Tŵr, St Davids, Wales, thirteenth century

== See also ==
- Octagon house
- List of octagon houses
