= Radcliffe Science Library =

Library of the University of Oxford

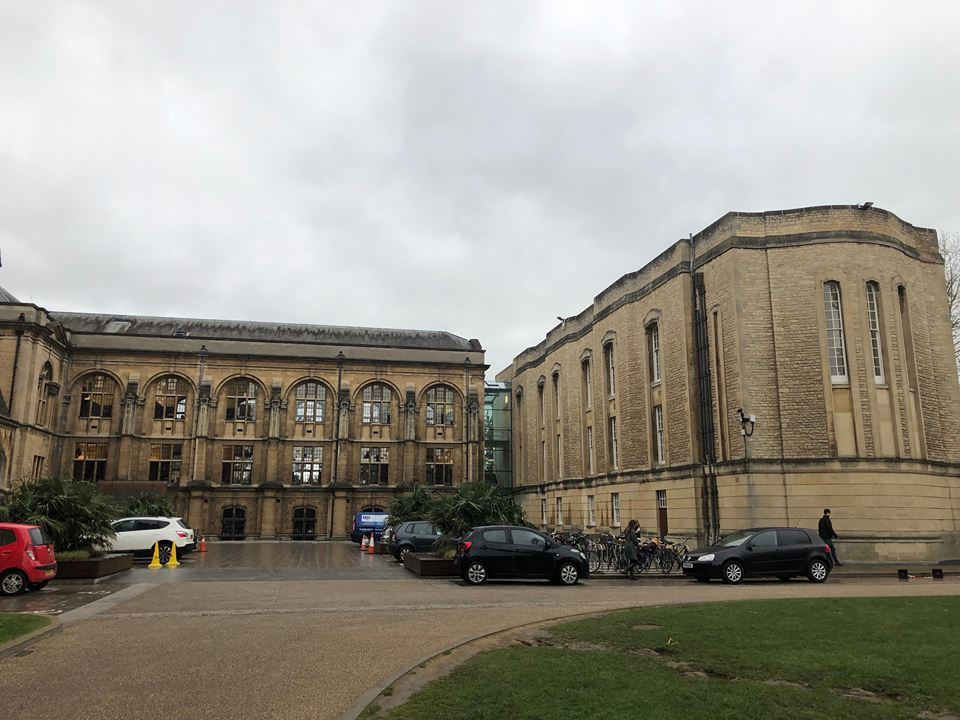
- The library seen from the north
- 51.7579°N 1.2559°W
- Location: Parks Road, Oxford, England, England, United Kingdom
- Type: Academic library
- Established: 1861
- Branch of: Bodleian Library

Collection
- Items collected: Books and journals in the biological sciences, computing science, experimental psychology, history of science, mathematics, medicine and the physical sciences
- Legal deposit: The library holds the Legal Deposit material in the sciences for Oxford University

Access and use
- Access requirements: University Card or Bodleian Libraries reader's card

Other information
- Website: www.bodleian.ox.ac.uk/libraries/rsl

The Radcliffe Science Library (RSL) is the main teaching and research science library at the University of Oxford in Oxford, England. Being officially part of the Bodleian Libraries, the library holds the Legal Deposit material for the sciences and is thus entitled to receive a copy of all British scientific publications.

Since 2023 the library has shared its buildings with Reuben College.

== History ==
The physician John Radcliffe died in 1714, leaving money in his will to establish the Radcliffe Observatory, the Radcliffe Infirmary and the Radcliffe Library, which was intended to contain "modern books in all faculties and languages, not in the Bodleian Library". The library's building on a site south of the Bodleian Library was completed in 1749 and is now known as the Radcliffe Camera.

The scientific books housed in the Radcliffe Camera were transferred to the Oxford University Museum of Natural History in 1861. A new Radcliffe Library building opened in 1901, on land next to the museum (on the corner of Parks Road and South Parks Road).

In 1927, the library lost its independence, for financial efficiency becoming part of the Bodleian Library. The library took on its current name, the Radcliffe Science Library, and gained the right as a legal deposit library to receive a copy of all new British scientific publications.

The building has doors with relief wood carvings by Don Potter, undertaken while he was studying with the sculptor Eric Gill.

With the construction of a basement in the 1970s, part of the building was used to form The Hooke Library, a (separate) science lending library for undergraduates, which was named after Robert Hooke, a scientist who worked in Oxford. The Hooke Library housed its collection in the ground floor of the Abbot's Kitchen which was originally part of the University Museum and on the staircase at the eastern end of the Jackson Wing of the RSL. The area which housed the Hooke Library collection became part of the RSL, with the ground floor of the Abbot's Kitchen transformed into a refreshment area and a training room.

Until 2007, the library was a reference library rather than a lending library. During 2007 the building and collection of the Hooke Library was integrated into the RSL.

In December 2018 it was announced that the premises would be used as the basis of a new non-residential graduate college of the university, Reuben College, alongside the library. The library closed for refurbishment in December 2019 and reopened in October 2023.

== The building ==
The RSL building consists of three parts, developed as expansion of the library was necessary:

1. The Jackson Wing, parallel to South Parks Road, is Grade II listed. Designed by Sir Thomas Jackson it opened in 1901. This wing housed parts of the RSL and previously housed part of the Hooke Library on the staircase at its east end. It is arranged over 3 floors, all above ground, and contained two reading rooms and administration offices.
2. The Worthington Wing, parallel to Parks Road and also Grade II listed, was designed as an extension to the Jackson Wing in 1934 by Hubert Worthington. The wing extends to the north of the western end of the Jackson Wing and contained two reading rooms, on the first and second floors, and the library entrance hall on the ground floor.
3. The Lankester Room and Main Stack, a two-storey extension under the lawn of the museum, built 1971–1974. The Lankester Room was a large reading room of the library containing the book collection. The stack contained additional storage for library materials.

From 2023 the library occupies the second floors of the Jackson and Worthington buildings, the former Lankester room and stack are a museum Collections Teaching and Research Centre for the university and other spaces are used by Reuben College or shared.

== Gallery ==
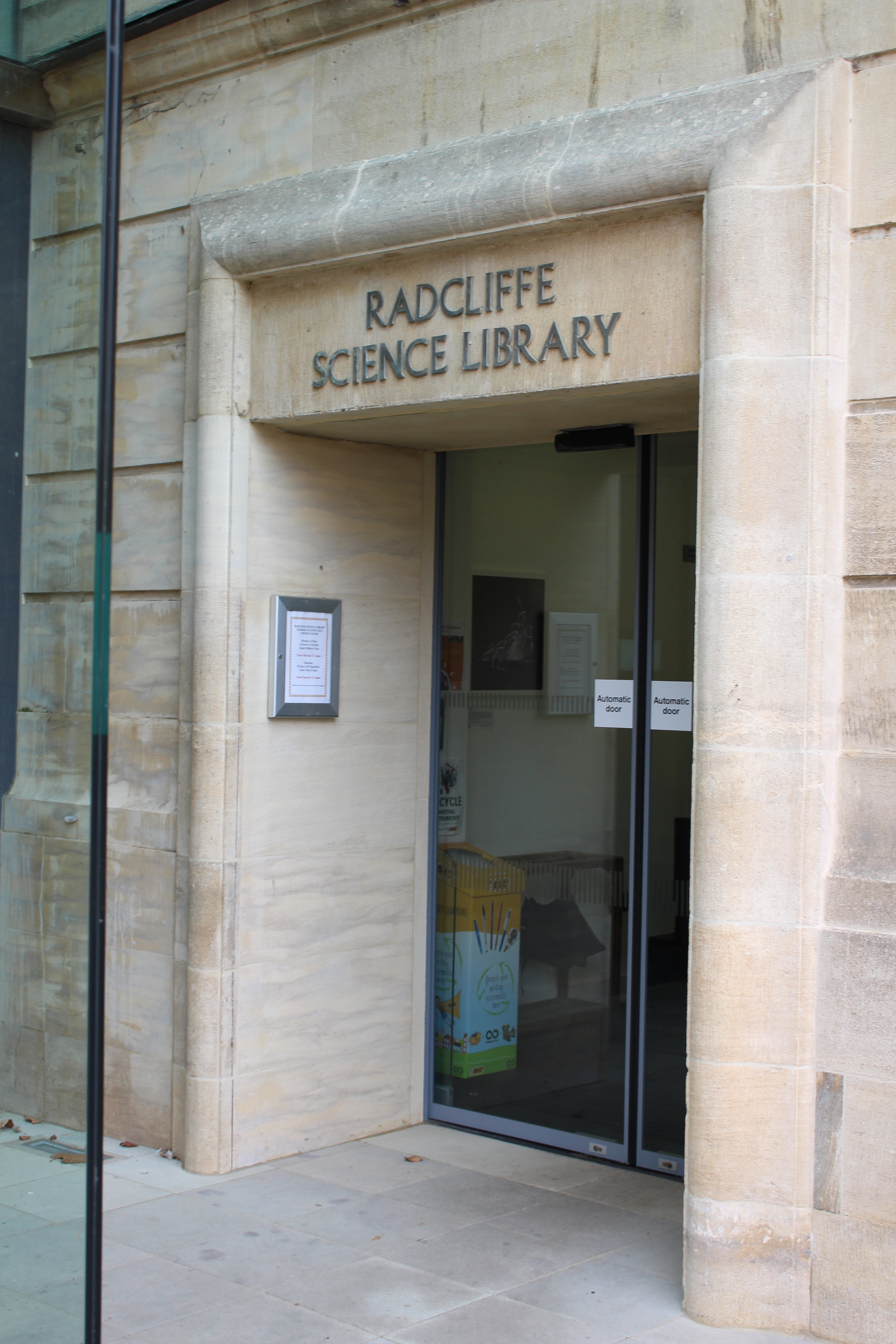
Entrance

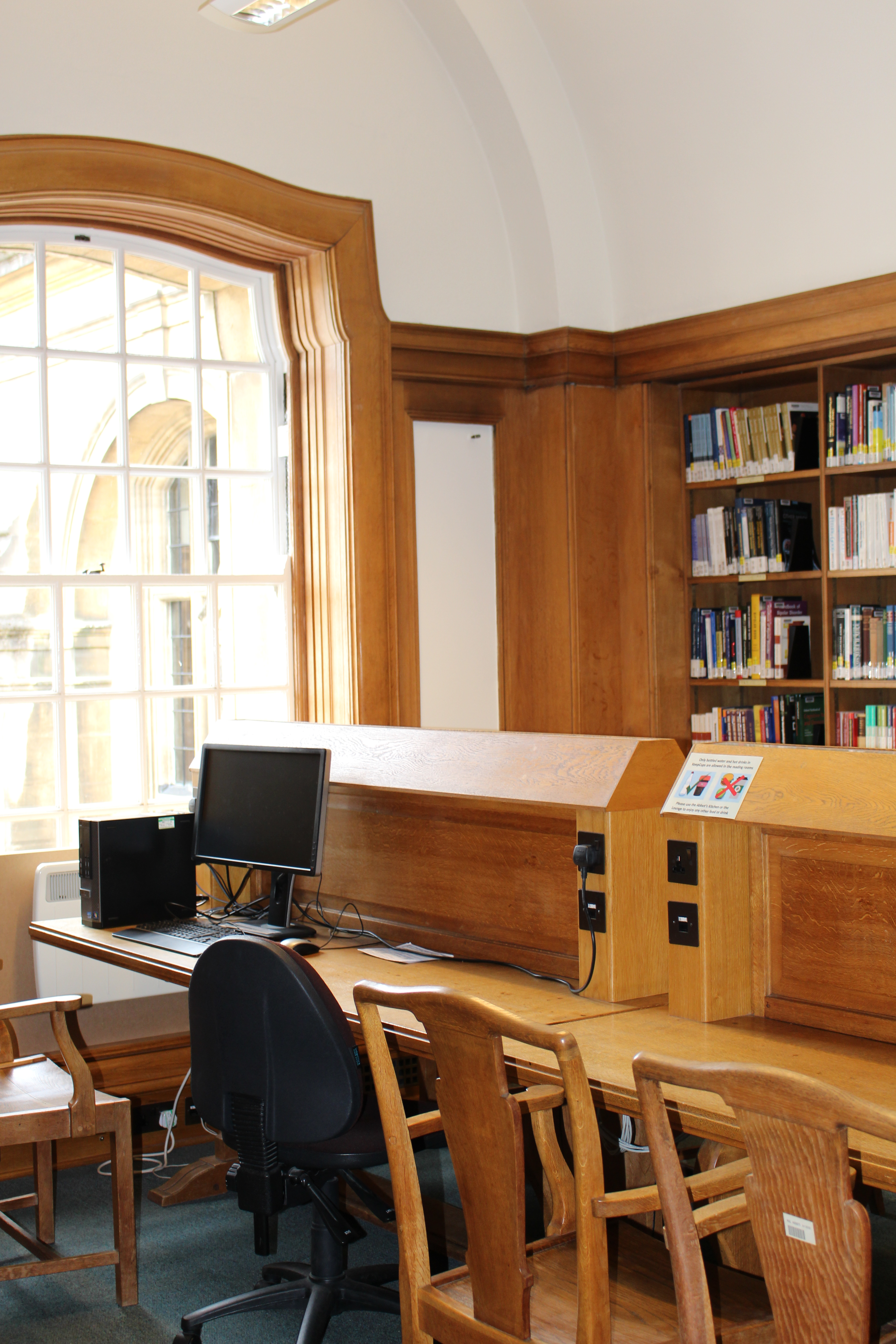
Desk inside the Worthington Wing

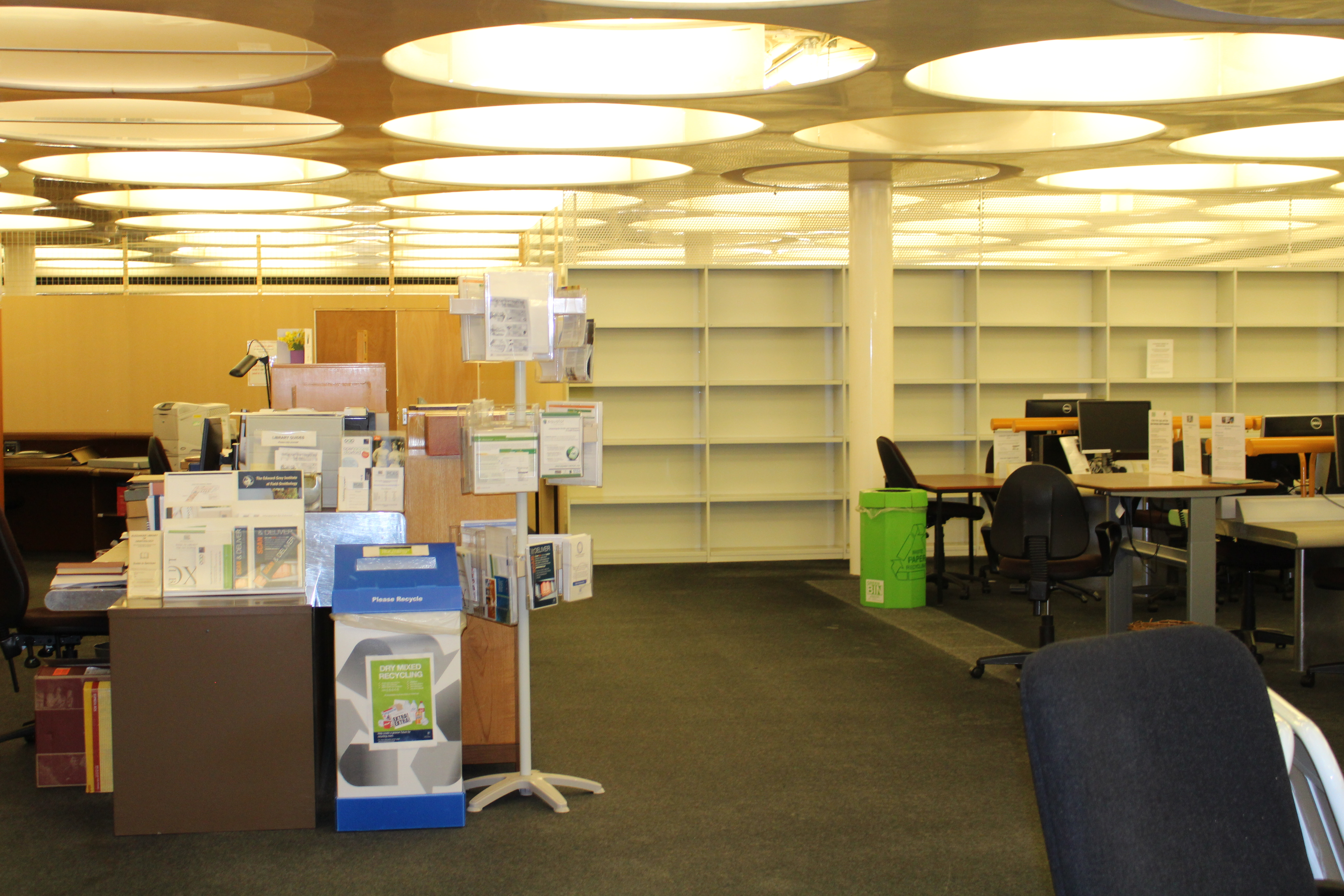
Alexander Library of Ornithology, circa 2018. This portion of the library closed permanently in 2020 and is now used by the nearby Natural History Museum and Pitt Rivers.

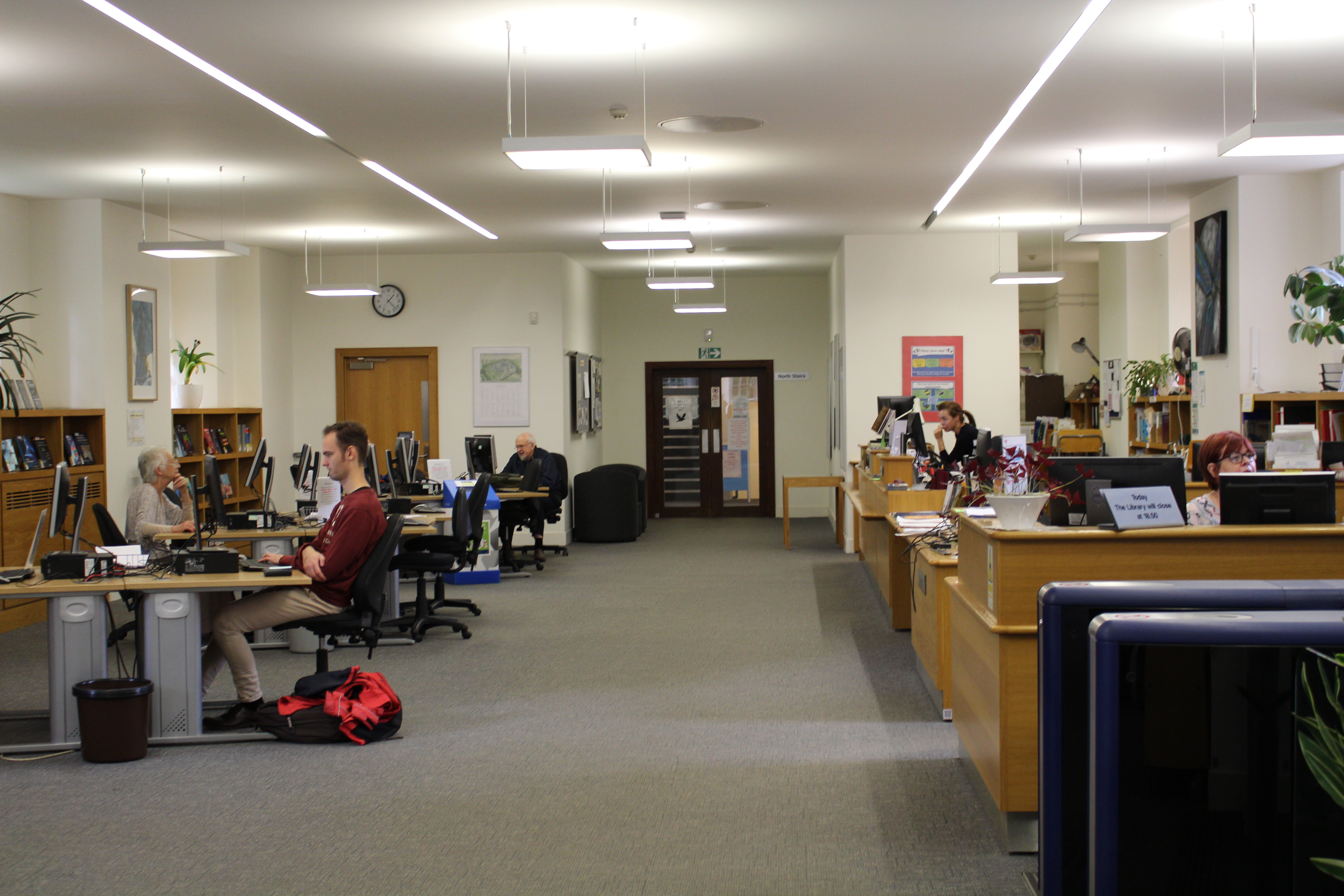
Ground floor interior, 2018

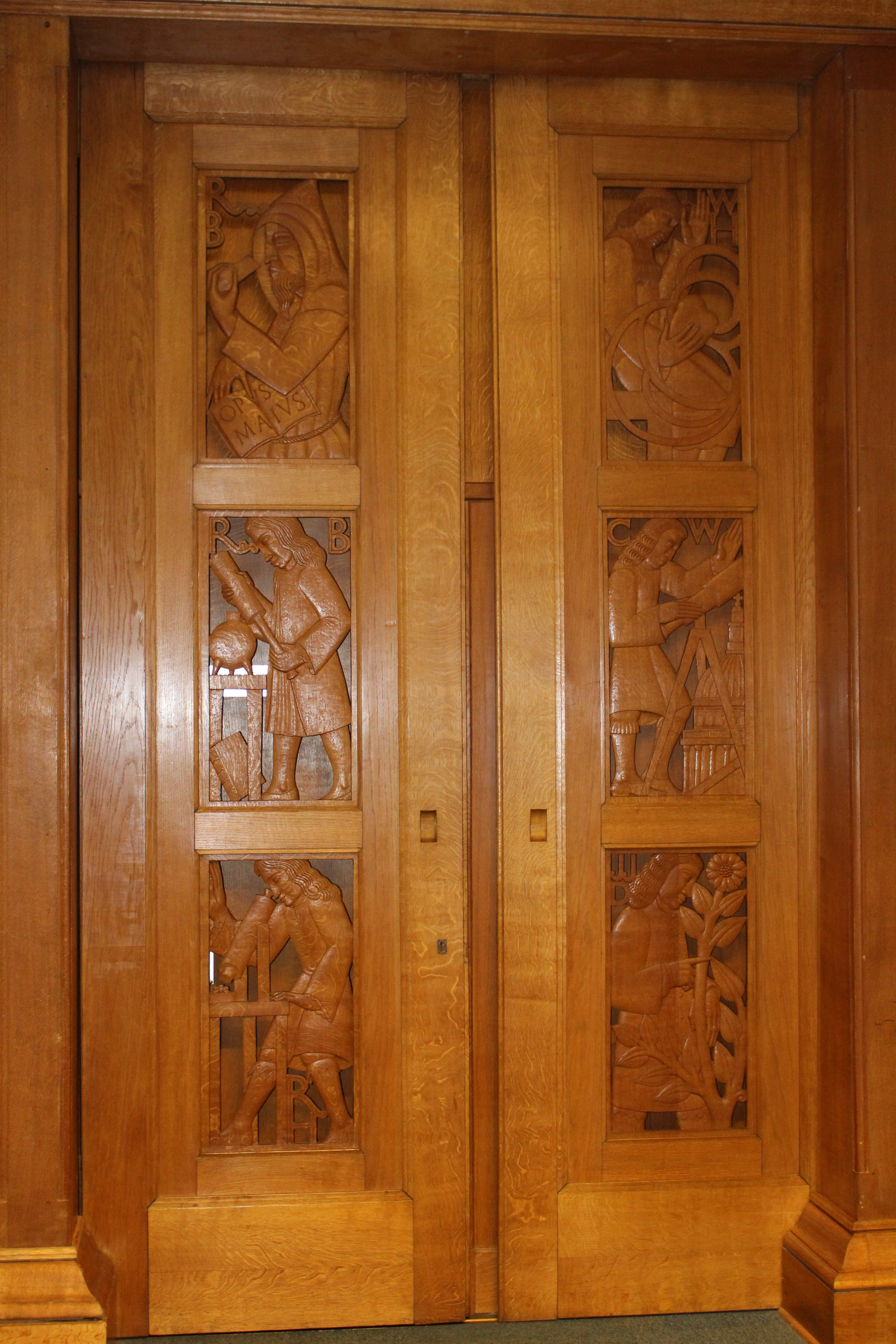
Door to the rare book room carved to a design by Eric Gill in 1935. Each panel features a famous scientist.
