= Abbot's Kitchen, Oxford =

Chemistry laboratory in Oxford, England

Coordinates: 51.7579°N 1.2557°W

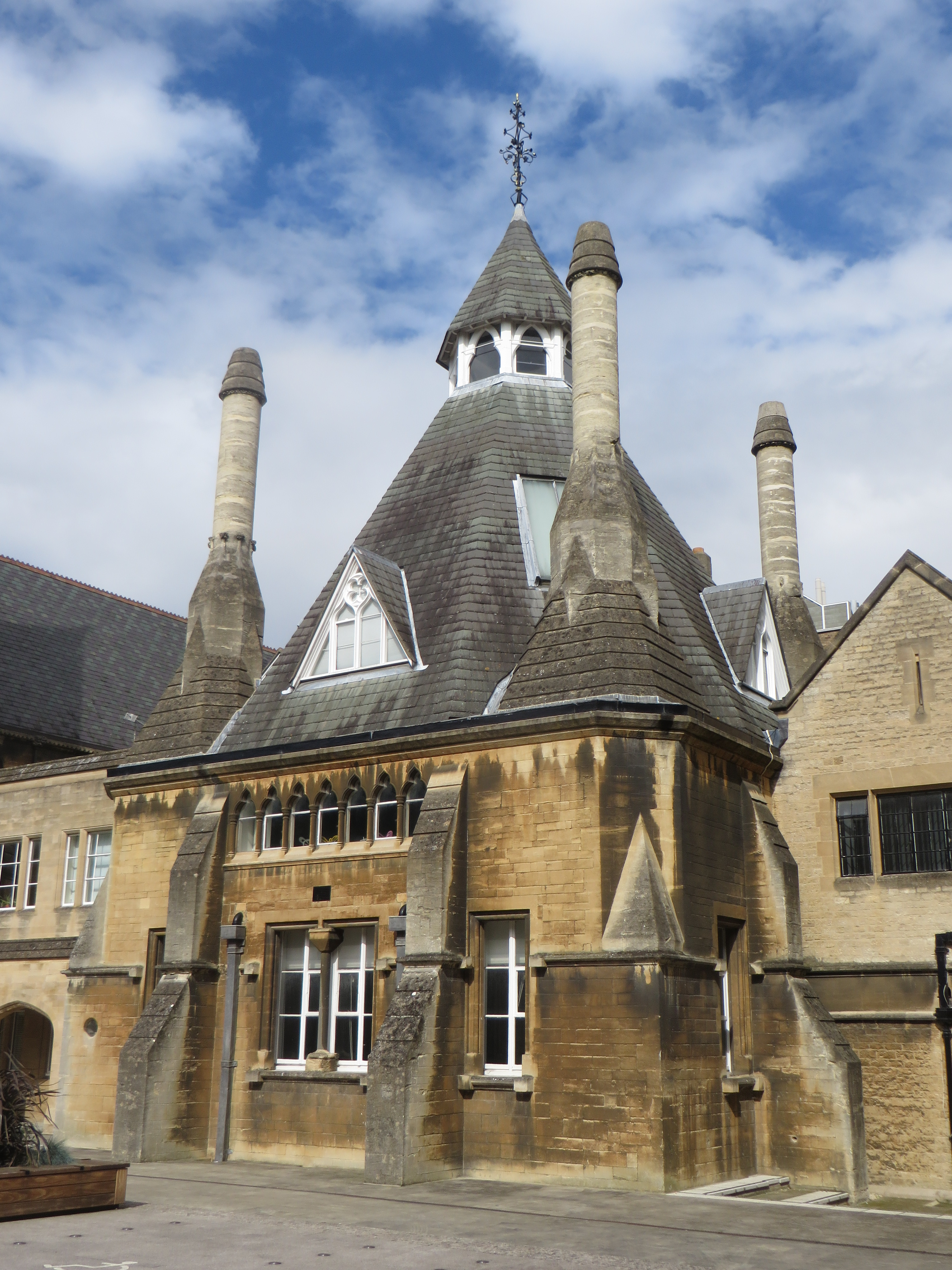
Abbot's Kitchen chemistry laboratory in Oxford

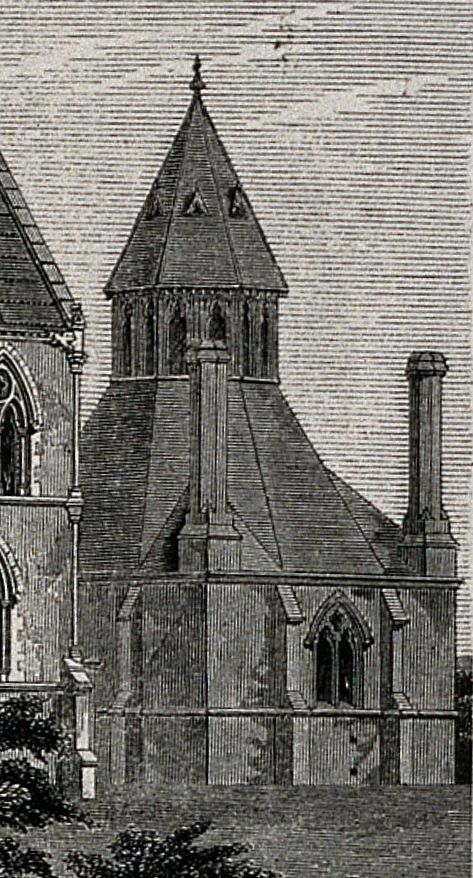
Detail of a wood engraving by W. E. Hodgkin of 1855 showing the Abbot's Kitchen

The Abbot's Kitchen in Oxford, England, is an early chemistry laboratory based on the Abbot's Kitchen at Glastonbury Abbey in Somerset, England, a mediaeval 14th-century octagonal building that served as the kitchen at the abbey.

== History ==
Chemistry was first recognized as a separate discipline at Oxford University with the construction of this laboratory, attached to the Oxford University Museum of Natural History, and opening in 1860. The laboratory is a stone-built structure to the right of the museum, built in the Victorian Gothic style. The building was one of the first ever purpose-built chemical laboratories anywhere and was extended in 1878. A further major extension adding three wings was completed in 1957. It is now part of the new graduate college of the University, Reuben College, which opened in 2023.

== Gallery ==
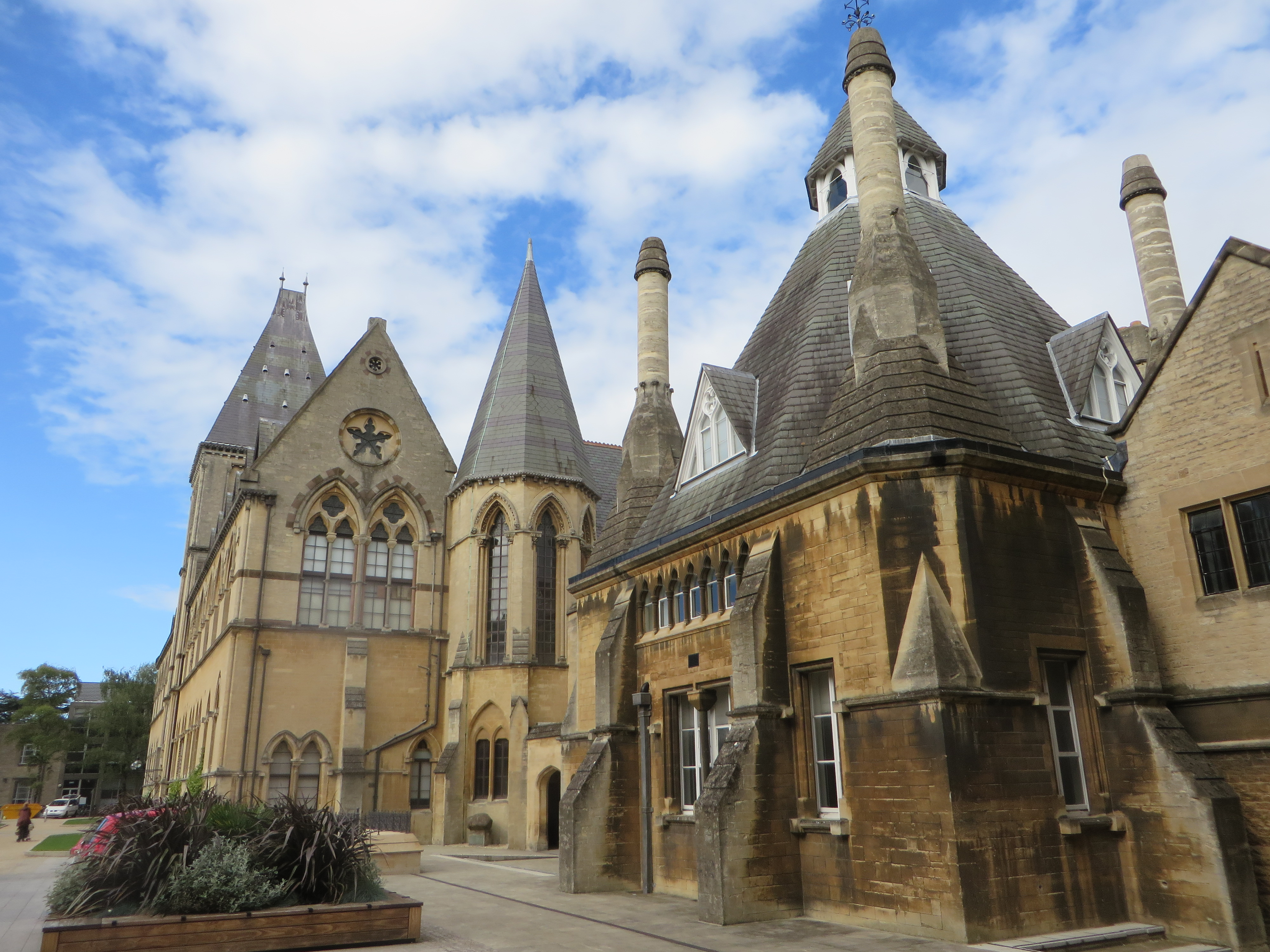
Oxford University Museum of Natural History (left) and the Abbot's Kitchen chemistry laboratory (right)

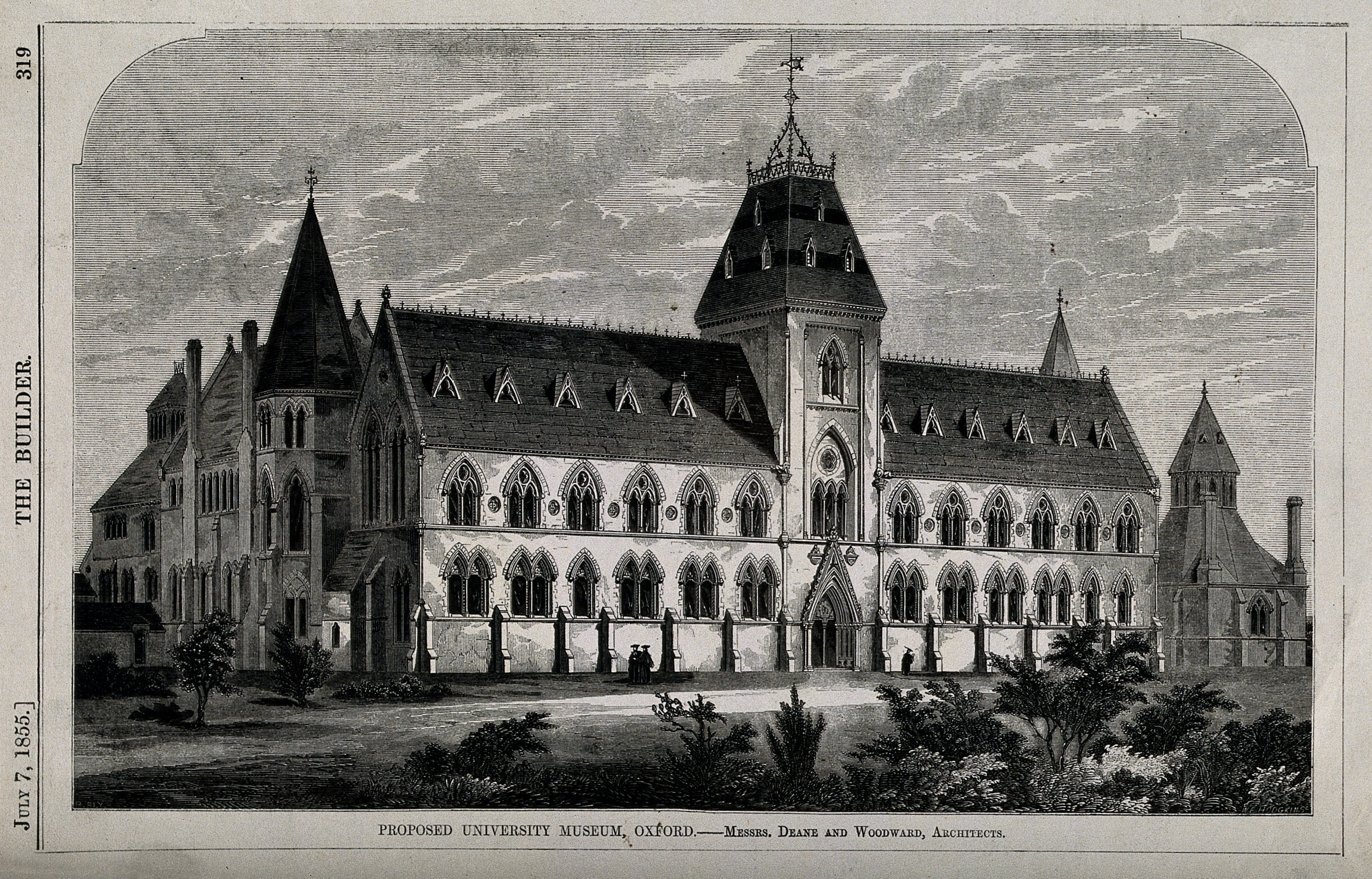
Wood engraving of the Oxford University Museum with the smaller octagonal Abbot's Kitchen building on the right, by W. E. Hodgkin (1855)

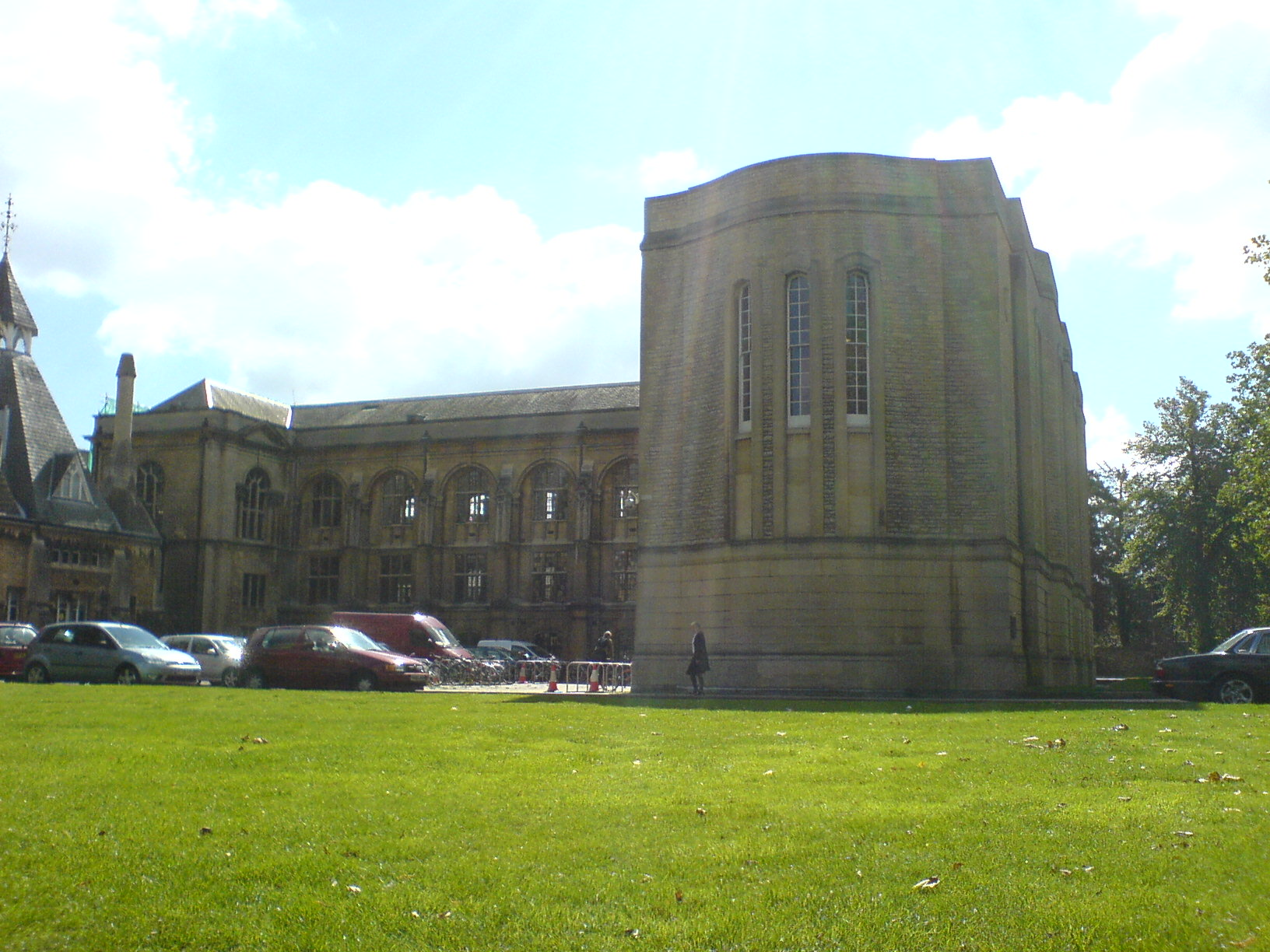
The Radcliffe Science Library with the Abbot's Kitchen on the left

== See also ==
- Abbot's Kitchen, Glastonbury, on which the laboratory building was based
- Balliol–Trinity Laboratories, another early Oxford chemistry laboratory
- Department of Chemistry, University of Oxford
- List of octagonal buildings and structures
