= Catríona Cannon =

Librarian (1968)

- Born: 1968 (age 57–58); Paris, France
- Education: Trinity College Dublin; Merton College, Oxford; University College London
- Occupation: Librarian

Catríona Jeanne Elizabeth Cannon (born 1968) is a librarian and academic. Since June 2021, she has been librarian of Senate House and programme director of the Library Transformation Programme at the University of London. She had previously worked at University College Dublin, National Gallery of Ireland, University of the Arts London and King's College London. Before moving to Senate House, she was deputy librarian of Bodleian Libraries, University of Oxford (2014–2021), and vice-president of Reuben College, Oxford (2019–2021).

== Early life and education ==
Cannon was born in 1968 in Paris, France. She was educated at Mount Temple Comprehensive School, a comprehensive secondary school in Dublin, Ireland. She studied French and Latin at Trinity College, Dublin, graduating with a Bachelor of Arts (BA) degree in 1990. From 1990 to 1992, she studied European literature at Merton College, Oxford, graduating with a Master of Philosophy (MPhil) degree. Her MPhil thesis was titled "Neo-Latin elegy in Lyons, 1528–1540: a study" and was supervised by R.H.A. Jenkins. She was a trainee librarian at the Warburg Institute, and then undertook a Master of Arts (MA) degree in library and information studies at University College London, completing it in 1995.

== Selected works ==
- Heaney, Michael; Cannon, Catríona, eds. (2012). Transforming the Bodleian. Berlin: De Gruyter Saur. ISBN 978-3110289213.
