= Reuben College, Oxford =

College of the University of Oxford

Reuben College
- University of Oxford
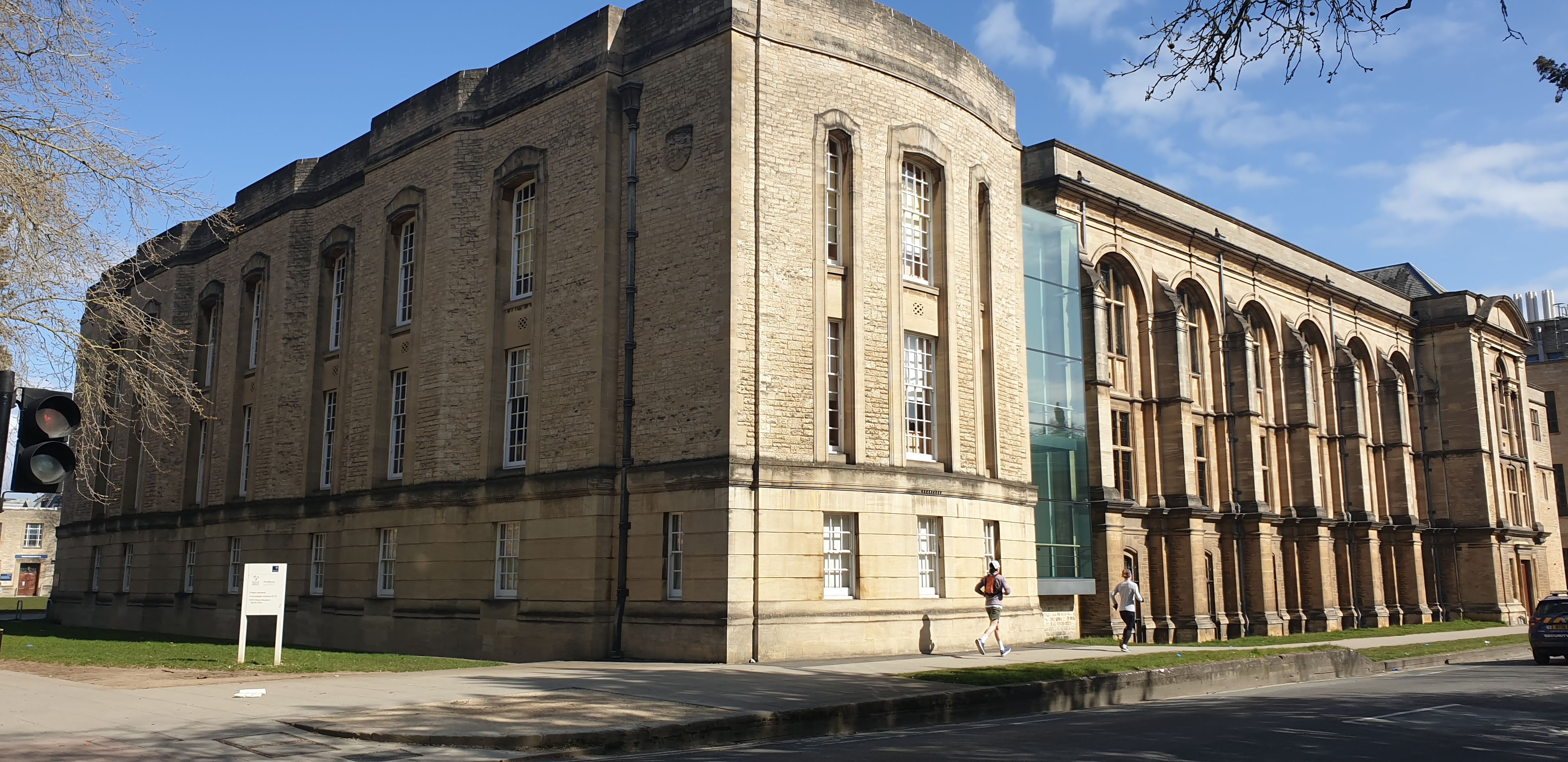
- View from Parks Road

- Arms: Argent in pale two Annulets and in base two Ermine Spots in fess Azure all between two Flaunches Vert each charged with an Ermine Spot Or
- Location: Parks Road, Oxford
- Coordinates: 51.7584°N 1.2554°W
- Latin name: Collegium de Reuben
- Motto: Per scientiam illuminabimur (through knowledge we shall be enlightened)
- Established: 2019
- Named for: David and Simon Reuben
- Former names: Parks College (2019–2020)
- President: Lord Tarassenko
- Undergraduates: N/A
- Postgraduates: 330
- Website: www.reuben.ox.ac.uk

Map
- Location within Oxford city centre

Reuben College is a constituent college of the University of Oxford in England. Proposals for the new graduate college, initially named Parks College, were announced in December 2018. It is the first new Oxford or Cambridge college founded since 1990, when Oxford's postgraduate Kellogg College was established. It is located in the Science Area on the historic Radcliffe Science Library site and took in its first graduate students in the 2021–2022 academic year.

== History ==
The establishment of Parks College was approved by a vote in the university congregation on 7 May 2019. On 11 June 2020, the university announced that it had received an £80 million gift from the Reuben Foundation towards an endowment and scholarships, which would be marked by changing the name of the college to Reuben College. The college was formally renamed on 30 June 2020.

The initial intake of graduate students was in the 2021–2022 academic year with an eventual annual intake of 200 students, studying for research degrees and on taught courses. Initially, there is a focus on three interdisciplinary research clusters, which will be increased to six or eight clusters once there is a full complement of graduate students.

Professor Lionel Tarassenko (head of the Department of Engineering Science) was invited by the Vice-Chancellor, Louise Richardson, to oversee the development of the college as its founding President. In September 2026, it was announced that David Gavaghan had been elected as the next President of the college.

The college appointed its first fellows in 2019. Its first vice-president was librarian Catríona Cannon (2019–2021), a role now filled by neuroscientist Esther Becker.

== Buildings ==
The former Radcliffe Science Library (RSL) building is located next to the Oxford University Museum of Natural History and consists of three parts:

- The Jackson Wing, parallel to South Parks Road, is Grade II listed. Designed by Sir Thomas Jackson it opened in 1901. It is arranged over 3 floors, all above ground.
- The Worthington Wing, parallel to Parks Road, was designed as an extension to the Jackson Wing in 1934 by Hubert Worthington. The wing extends to the north of the western end of the Jackson Wing and contains the entrance hall on the ground floor.
- The Lankester Room and Main Stack, a two-storey extension under the lawn of the museum, built between 1972 and 1975.

Reuben College also includes the western wing of the Inorganic Chemistry Laboratory and Abbot's Kitchen. In 2019, the university launched a major refurbishment project to modernise and convert these facilities into shared space for the Radcliffe Science Library, museum collections storage and the new Reuben College. The project was completed in 2023. Student accommodation is offered in the newly refurbished building at Farndon Court.

== Academic focus ==
At its launch in 2019, the college identified three initial key areas of knowledge as the focus of its research:

- Artificial intelligence and machine learning
- Environmental change
- Cellular life

In November 2020, the college announced a fourth academic theme, "ethics and values", which was subsequently expanded and renamed to "values and society" in September 2025.

== Sport ==
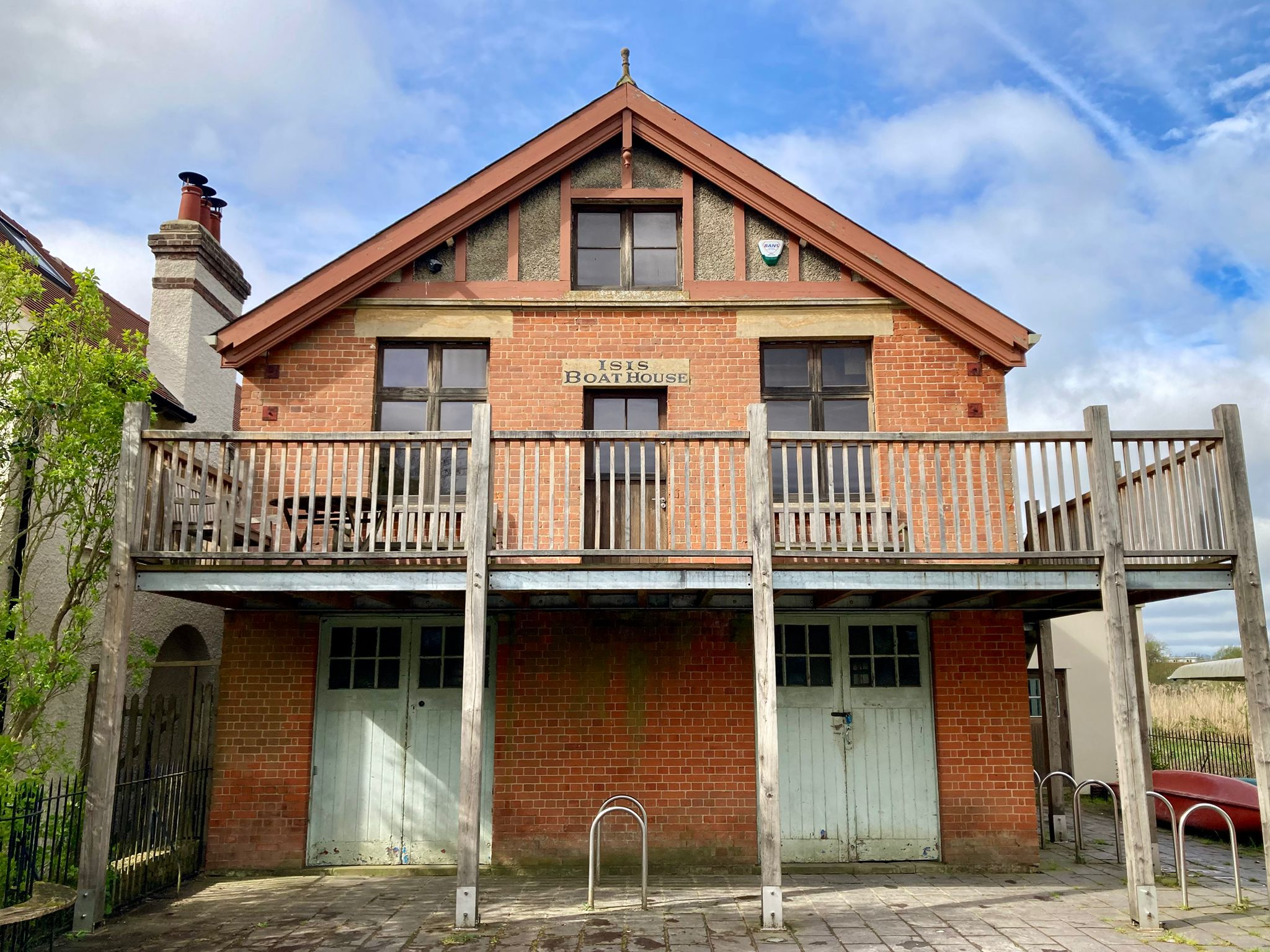
Isis Boat House

From the foundation of the college until the close of the 2022/23 academic year, Reuben members rowed as full members of Linacre Boat Club, which represents fellow postgraduate colleges Linacre and Nuffield. However, in the summer of 2023 Reuben College's boat club incorporated with that of St Benet's Hall, a former permanent private hall of the university closed the year before, to form the St Benet's, Blackfriars', and Reuben College Boat Club. They row from the Isis Boathouse, below the Gut, near Iffley Lock.

== Administration ==
Together with Kellogg and St Cross, Reuben is one of only three Oxford colleges without a royal charter, meaning it is officially a society of the university rather than an independent college. The college has expressed its intention to pursue a royal charter in the future.

The main difference from an independent college is that the governing body only recommends a president, who is then appointed by Council; in other colleges, the head of house is elected and appointed by the governing body directly. For accounting purposes, the societies are considered departments of the university.
