= Glastonbury Abbey =

Former Benedictine abbey at Somerset, England

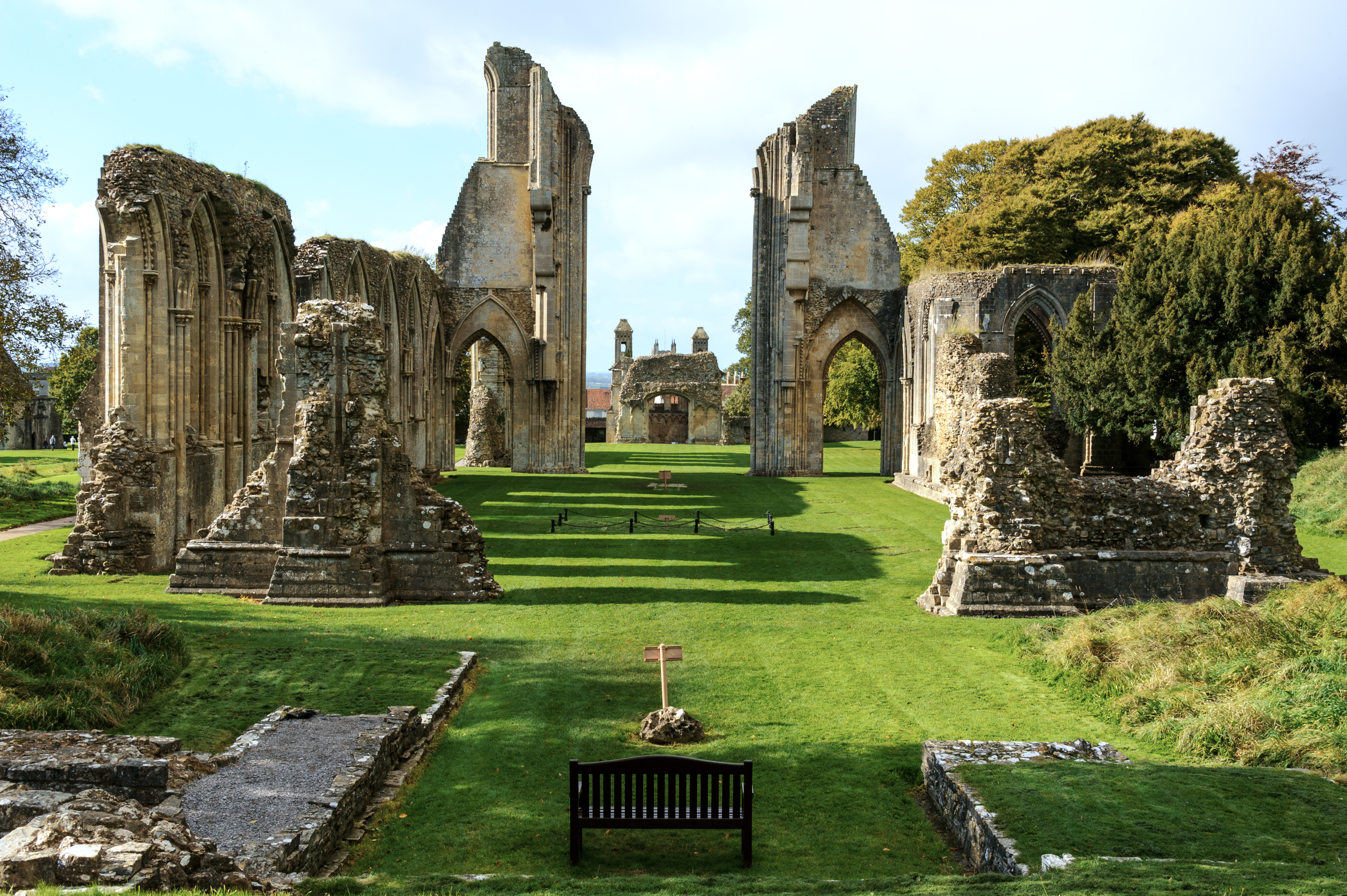
- Glastonbury Abbey church ruin seen from the east end of the apse

- Location within Somerset

Monastery information
- Order: Benedictine
- Denomination: Roman Catholic
- Established: 712
- Disestablished: 1539

People
- Founder: King Ine of Wessex
- Important associated figures: Saint Dunstan, Henry of Blois, Henry de Sully, Savaric FitzGeldewin, Richard Whiting

Architecture
- Status: Ruins

Site
- Location: Glastonbury, Somerset
- Country: England
- Coordinates: 51°8′46″N 2°42′55″W

Scheduled monument
- Official name: Glastonbury Abbey
- Designated: 9 October 1981
- Reference no.: 1021077

Listed Building – Grade I
- Official name: Glastonbury Abbey
- Type: Grade I
- Designated: 21 June 1950
- Reference no.: 1345447

Glastonbury Abbey was a monastery in Glastonbury, Somerset, England. Its ruins, a grade I listed building and scheduled monument, are open as a visitor attraction.

The abbey was founded in the 8th century and enlarged in the 10th. Destroyed by a fire in 1184, it was subsequently rebuilt, and by the 14th century it was one of the richest and most powerful monasteries in England. The abbey controlled large tracts of the surrounding land and was instrumental in major drainage projects on the Somerset Levels. The abbey was suppressed during the Dissolution of the Monasteries under King Henry VIII of England. The last abbot, Richard Whiting (Whyting), was hanged, drawn and quartered as a traitor on Glastonbury Tor in 1539.

From at least the 12th century, the Glastonbury area has been associated with the legend of King Arthur, a connection promoted by medieval monks who asserted that Glastonbury was Avalon. Christian legends have claimed that the abbey was founded by Joseph of Arimathea in the 1st century.

== History ==
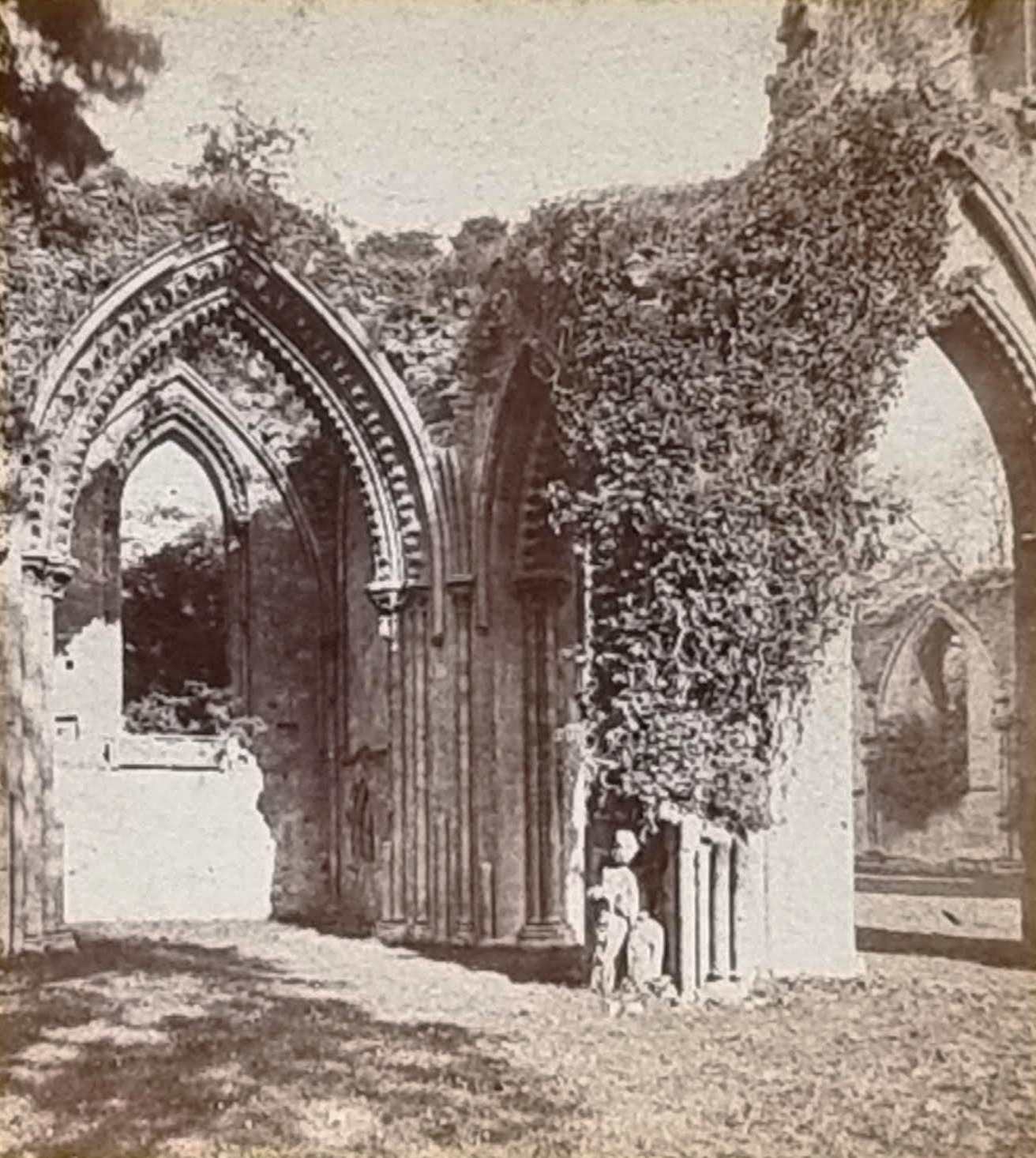
St. Edgar's and St. Mary's Chapels, Glastonbury Abbey, c. 1860, by Frank M Good

Suggestions that Glastonbury may have been a site of religious importance in Celtic or pre-Celtic times are considered dubious by the historian Ronald Hutton, but archaeological investigations by the University of Reading have demonstrated Roman and Saxon occupation of the site. In 1955 Ralegh Radford's excavations uncovered Romano-British pottery at the west end of the cloister. The abbey was founded by Britons and dates at least to the early-7th century. Medieval occupation of the site is evidenced by pieces of ceramic wine jars that were imported from the Mediterranean. A medieval legend claimed that the abbey was founded by Joseph of Arimathea in the 1st century. This legend is intimately tied to Robert de Boron's version of the Holy Grail story and Glastonbury's connection with King Arthur from the early-12th century. William of Malmesbury reports the terms of a grant of land made by King Gwrgan of Damnonia to the "old church" at Glastonbury in AD 601 in the time of Abbot Worgret.

Glastonbury fell into Saxon hands after the Battle of Peonnum in 658. Saxons under Cenwalh of Wessex conquered Somerset as far west as the River Parrett, perhaps with the intention of gaining control of the abbey. Cenwalh allowed the British abbot, Bregored, to remain in power, a move perhaps intended as a show of good faith to the defeated Britons. After Bregored's death in 669, he was replaced by an Anglo-Saxon, Berhtwald, but British monks remained for many years.

=== Saxon era ===
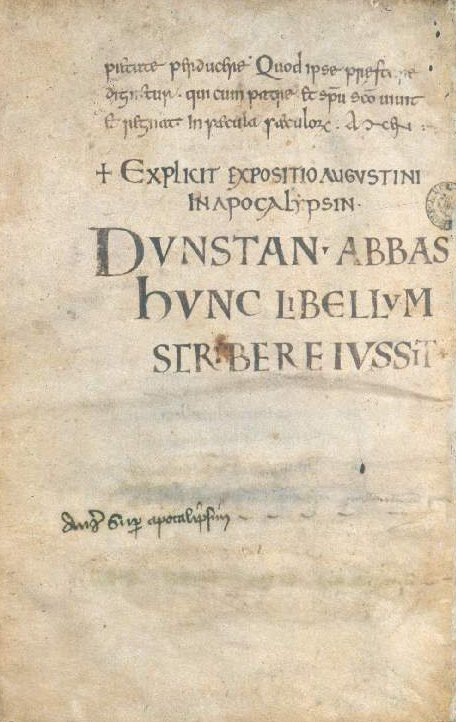
One of the earliest surviving manuscripts, now at the Bodleian Library in Oxford, telling that "Dunstan the abbot gave orders for the writing of this book"

King Ine of Wessex enriched the endowment of the community of monks established at Glastonbury and reputed to have directed that a stone church be built in 712, the foundations of which form the west end of the nave. A glassworks was established at the site during the 7th century. Glastonbury was affected by unrest due to the Danish incursions into the area in the 9th century and it may itself have been attacked during the wars (though this is not certain). The contemporary reformed soldier Saint Neot was sacristan at Glastonbury before he founded his own establishment in Somerset. The abbey church was enlarged in the 10th century by the abbot of Glastonbury, Dunstan, the central figure in the 10th-century revival of English monastic life, who instituted the Benedictine Rule at Glastonbury. He also built the cloisters. Dunstan became Archbishop of Canterbury in 960. In 946, King Edmund was interred at Glastonbury. In 1016 King Edmund Ironside was also buried there. King Cnut's charter of 1032 was "written and promulgated in the wooden church at Glastonbury, in the king's presence".

The medieval Glastonbury Canal was built about the middle of the 10th century to link the abbey with the River Brue, a distance of about 1.75 kilometres (1,900 yd). Its purpose is believed to have been to transport stone to build the abbey, but later it was used to transport produce, including grain, wine and fish, from the abbey's outlying properties. Much of the building stone came from the abbey's quarries at Doulting, accessed by way of the River Sheppey at Pilton. From the 11th century, the abbey was the centre of a large water-borne transport network as further canalisations and new channels were made, including the diversion of the Brue to access to the estate at Meare and an easier route to the Bristol Channel. In the 13th century, the abbey's head boatman transported the abbot in an eight-oared boat on visits to the abbey's nearby manors. During the Middle Ages, bone fragments of Saint Caesarius of Terracina were translated to Glastonbury Abbey.

=== Medieval era ===
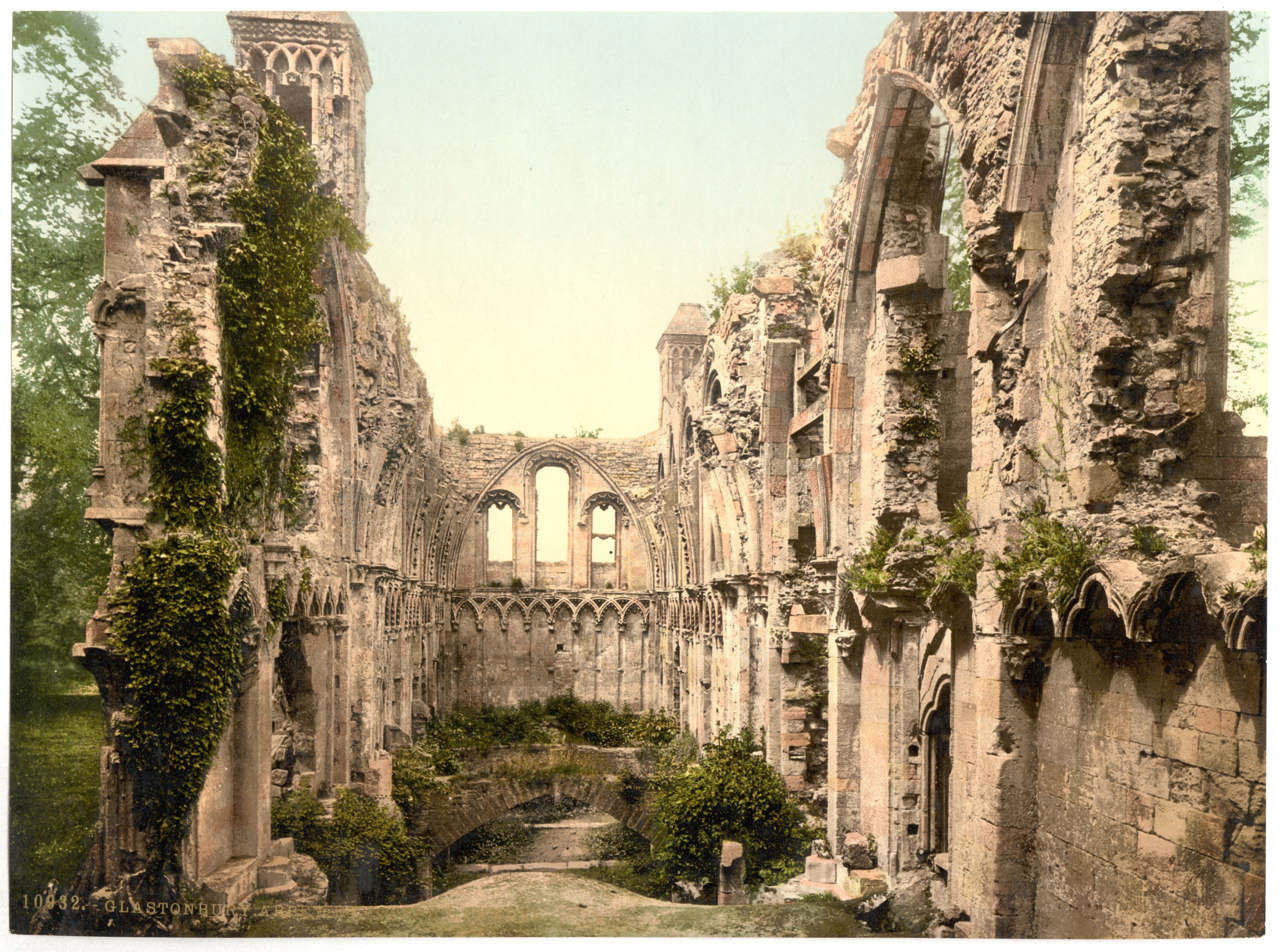
Photochrom image taken around 1900, showing the unrestored interior of the Lady Chapel

==== Norman conquest ====
At the Norman Conquest in 1066, the wealth of Glastonbury made it a prime prize. William the Conqueror made Turstinus a Norman abbot there in 1086. Turstinus added to the church, unusually building to the east of the older Saxon church and away from the ancient cemetery, thus shifting the sanctified site. This was later changed by Herlewin, the next abbot, who built a larger church. Not all the new Normans were suitable heads of religious communities. In 1086, when the Domesday Book was commissioned, Glastonbury Abbey was the richest monastery in the country. About 1125, the abbot Henry of Blois commissioned a history of Glastonbury from the historian William of Malmesbury, who was a guest of the monks. His work "On the Antiquity of the Glastonese Church" was compiled sometime between 1129 and 1139 as part of a campaign to establish the abbey's primacy against Westminster. It is the source for much of our knowledge of the abbey's early history but is far below William's generally excellent standards: his acceptance of the monks' forged charters and unsubstantiated early legends is apparent and even his list of the community's abbots cannot be reconciled with 10th-century originals subsequently discovered. These problems and the discrepancies between "On the Antiquity" and his own later histories has led many scholars to assume that William's original text was more careful and its accounts of "Phagan" and "Deruvian", along with various passages about Arthur, were later additions meant to bolster the monks' case.

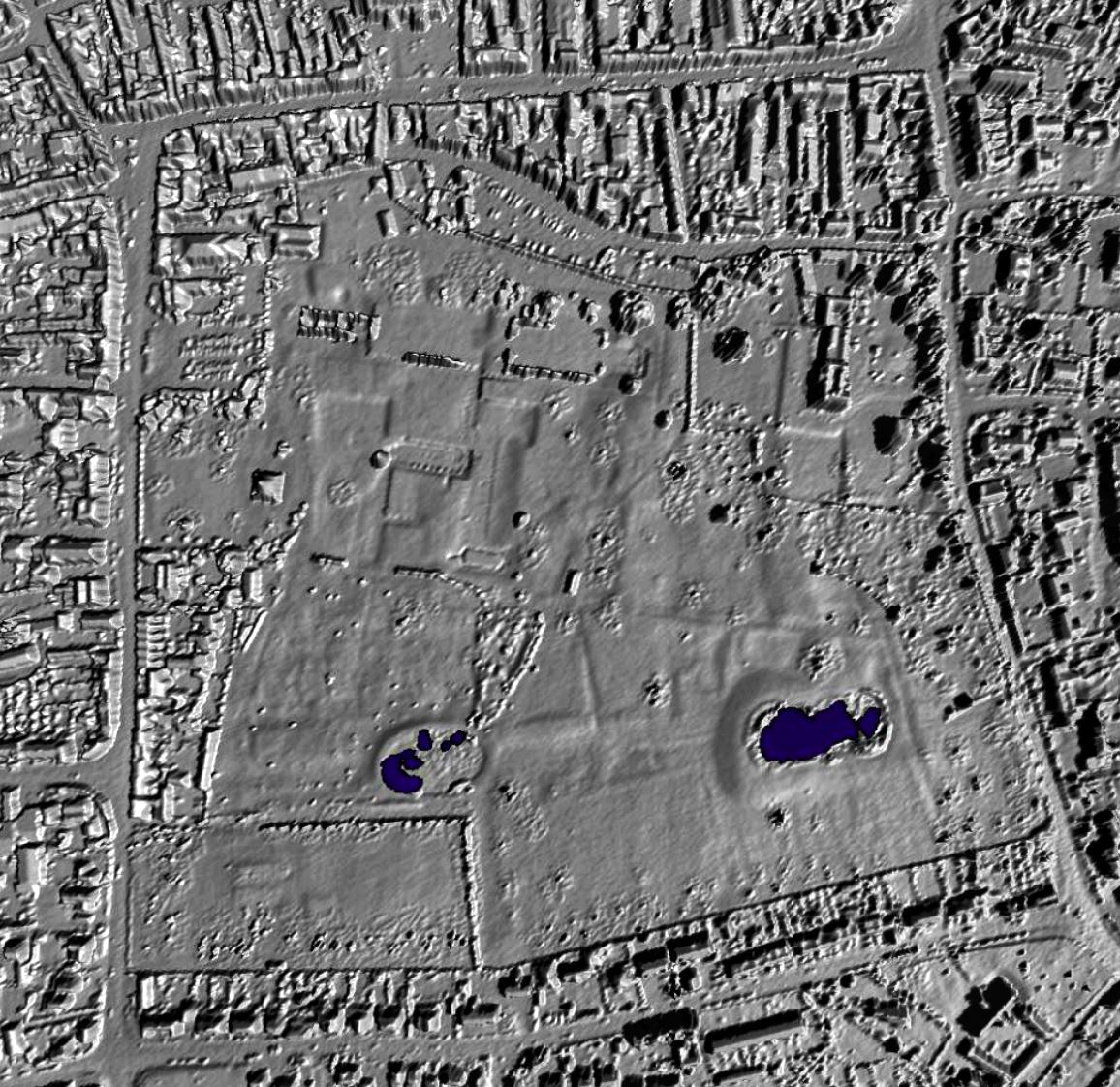
A lidar view of Glastonbury Abbey and associated features

Early drainage work on the Somerset Levels was carried out in the later years of the 12th century, with the responsibility for maintaining all the watercourses between Glastonbury and the sea being placed on named individuals among whom were Ralph de Sancta Barbara of Brentmarsh. In 1129, the abbot of Glastonbury was recorded as inspecting enclosed land at Lympsham. Efforts to control flooding on the Parrett were recorded around the same date. In 1234, 722 acres (2.9 km^{2}) were reclaimed near Westonzoyland and, from the accounts in the abbey's rent books, this had increased to 972 acres (393 ha) by 1240. In the 14th century a Fish House was built at Meare for the chief fisherman of the abbot of Glastonbury that was also used for salting and preparing fish. It is the only surviving monastic fishery building in England. At the time of the Dissolution in 1540, Meare Pool was said to contain a great abundance of pike, tench, roach and eels. In 1638, it was owned by William Freake, who described it as "lately a fish pool". The importance of this industry is illustrated by a series of acrimonious disputes between Glastonbury and the Dean and Chapter of Wells Cathedral. The abbey required fish on Fridays, fast days and during Lent. As many as 5000 eels were landed in a typical year.

==== King Arthur's tomb ====
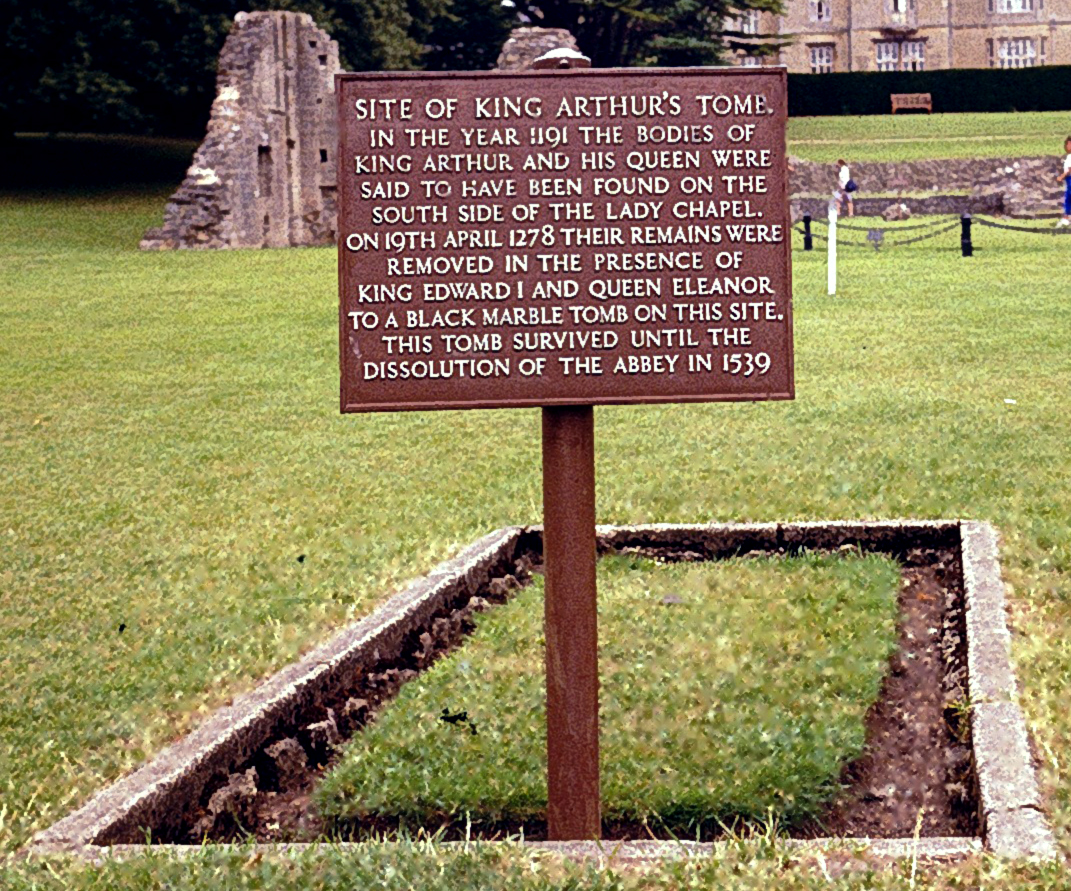
Site of King Arthur and Queen Guinevere's purported tomb beneath the high altar

In 1184, a great fire at Glastonbury destroyed the monastic buildings. Reconstruction began almost immediately and the Lady Chapel, which includes the well, was consecrated in 1186. There is evidence that, in the 12th century, the ruined nave was renovated enough for services while the great new church was being constructed. Parts of the walls of the aisle and crossing having been completed by 1189, progress then continued more slowly.

Pilgrim visits had fallen and in 1191 the alleged discovery of King Arthur and Queen Guinevere's tomb in the cemetery provided fresh impetus for visiting Glastonbury. A contemporaneous, though not an eyewitness, account was given by Giraldus Cambrensis in his De principis instructione ("Instruction of a Prince", c. 1193) and recollected in his Speculum Ecclesiae, c. 1216 according to which the abbot, Henry de Sully, commissioned a search, discovering at the depth of 16 feet (5 m) a massive hollowed oak trunk containing two skeletons. Above it, under the covering stone, according to Giraldus, was a lead cross with the unmistakably specific inscription Hic jacet sepultus inclitus rex Arturius in insula Avalonia ("Here lies interred the famous King Arthur on the Isle of Avalon").

According to Giraldus, the digging for the tomb was prompted by the intelligence obtained by Henry II from an "aged British (Welsh) bard" (Latin: historico cantore Britone audierat antiquo). On the other hand, Ralph of Coggeshall writing somewhat later, states more prosaically that they came upon the older tomb by chance while removing the earth to bury a certain monk who had expressed strong desire to be buried there. Both Giraldus and Ralph say that the spot lay in between two pyramids in the abbey. William of Malmesbury does not refer to Arthur's tomb but elaborates on the pyramids of varying height, upon which were statues with inscriptions "Her Sexi, and Bliserh ... Pencrest, Bantomp, Pinepegn, etc."

Historians today generally dismiss the authenticity of the find, attributing it to a publicity stunt performed to raise funds to repair the Abbey, which was mostly burned in 1184. William of Malmesbury's history of the English kings stated "Arthur's grave is nowhere seen, whence antiquity of fables still claims that he will return" and his work "On the Antiquity of the Glastonese Church"—larded as it is with known and suspected pious forgeries—nowhere mentions a connection between the abbey and either Arthur's grave or Avalon. The fact that the search for Arthur's body is connected to Henry II and Edward I, both kings who fought major Welsh wars, has had scholars suggest that propaganda may have played a part as well. Giraldus, a constant supporter of royal authority, in his account of the discovery clearly aims to destroy the idea of the possibility of King Arthur's messianic return: "Many tales are told and many legends have been invented about King Arthur and his mysterious ending. In their stupidity the British [i.e. Welsh, Cornish and Bretons] people maintain that he is still alive. Now that the truth is known, I have taken the trouble to add a few more details in this present chapter. The fairy-tales have been snuffed out, and the true and indubitable facts are made known, so that what really happened must be made crystal clear to all and separated from the myths which have accumulated on the subject."

==== Annexation to Bath and Wells ====
In 1197, Savaric FitzGeldewin, Bishop of Bath and Wells, traded the city of Bath to the king in return for the monastery of Glastonbury. Savaric secured the support of Pope Celestine III for the takeover the abbey as the seat of his bishopric, replacing Bath. The plan was that Savaric would be bishop of Bath as well as abbot of Glastonbury. In his support, Savaric obtained letters from various ecclesiastics, including the Archbishop of Canterbury, Hubert Walter, that claimed that this arrangement would settle longstanding disputes between the abbey and the bishops. The monks of Glastonbury objected to Savaric's plan, and sent an appeal to Rome, which was dismissed in 1196. But King Richard, no longer imprisoned in Germany, sided with the monks, and allowed them to elect an abbot, William Pica, in place of Savaric, who responded by excommunicating the new abbot. With the succession of John as king in place of his brother Richard in 1199, Savaric managed to force his way into the monastery and set up his episcopal see within the abbey. The monks appealed to Innocent III, the new pope.

At first, Innocent took the side of the monks, and lifted Pica's excommunication. While the newest appeal was taking place, Pica and a number of his supporters, who had travelled to Rome to appeal in person, died in Rome in 1200, and some of the monks alleged this was by poison administered on the orders of Savaric. Meanwhile, Innocent had changed his mind, and reinstalled Savaric as abbot, ordering some English clergy to judge the specifics of the case, and allot the revenues of the abbey between Savaric and the monks. Savaric then attempted to secure more control over other monasteries in his diocese, but died before he could set the plans in motion.

The bishops continued to use the title Bishop of Bath and Glastonbury until finally renouncing their claim to Glastonbury in 1219. Services in the reconsecrated Great Church had begun on Christmas Day, 1213, most likely before it was entirely completed. King Edward I and Queen Eleanor attended the magnificent service at the reburial of King Arthur's remains to the foot of the High Altar in 1278.

==== 14th and 15th centuries ====
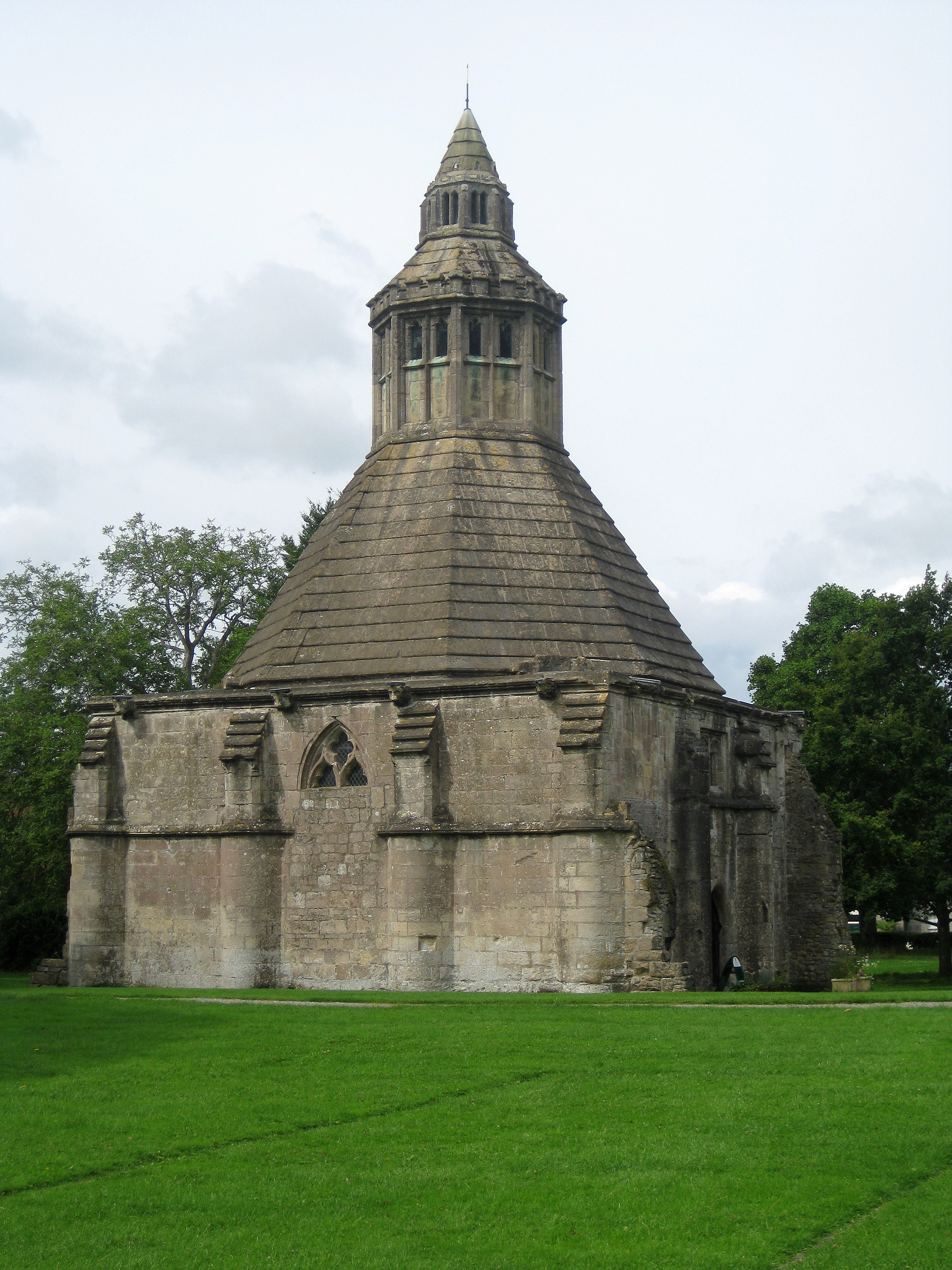
The Abbot's Kitchen

In the 14th century, only Westminster Abbey was more richly endowed and appointed than Glastonbury. The abbot of Glastonbury kept great estate, now attested to simply by the ruins of the Abbot's Kitchen, with four huge fireplaces at its corners. The kitchen was part of the magnificent abbot's house begun under Abbot John de Breynton (1334–42). It is one of the best preserved medieval kitchens in Europe, and the only substantial monastic building surviving at Glastonbury. Archaeological excavations have revealed a special apartment erected at the south end of the abbot's house for a visit from Henry VII, who visited the abbot in a royal progress, as he visited any other great territorial magnate. The conditions of life in England during the Wars of the Roses became so unsettled that a wall was built around the abbey's precincts.

The George Hotel and Pilgrims' Inn was built in the late 15th century to accommodate visitors to the abbey. It has been designated as a Grade I listed building. The abbey also held lands outside the town serving large parts of Somerset and including parts of neighbouring counties. Tithe barns were built to hold the crops due to the abbey including those at Doulting, Mells and Pilton.

=== Dissolution of the monasteries ===
At the start of the dissolution of the monasteries in 1536, there were over 850 monasteries, nunneries and friaries in England. By 1541, there were none. More than 15,000 monks and nuns had been dispersed and the buildings had been seized by the Crown to be sold off or leased to new lay occupants. Glastonbury Abbey was reviewed as having significant amounts of silver and gold as well as its attached lands. In September 1539, the abbey was visited by Richard Layton, Richard Pollard and Thomas Moyle, who arrived there without warning on the orders of Thomas Cromwell. The abbey was stripped of its valuables and Abbot Richard Whiting (Whyting), who had been a signatory to the Act of Supremacy that made Henry VIII the head of the church, resisted and was hanged, drawn and quartered as a traitor on Glastonbury Tor on 15 November 1539.

=== Decline ===
After the Dissolution, two of the abbey's manors in Wiltshire were sold by the Crown to John Thynne and thereafter descended in his family, who much later became Marquesses of Bath. The Thynnes have preserved many of the abbey's Wiltshire records at Longleat up to the present day. The ruins of the abbey itself was stripped of lead and dressed stones hauled away to be used in other buildings. The site was granted by Edward VI to Edward Seymour, 1st Duke of Somerset who established a colony of Protestant Dutch weavers on the site. When Seymour was attainted in 1551, the abbey site reverted to the crown, but the weavers remained until they were removed in the reign of Queen Mary. In 1559 Elizabeth I of England granted the site to Peter Carew, and it remained in private ownership until the beginning of the 20th century. Further stones were removed in the 17th century, so that by the beginning of the 18th century the abbey was described as a ruin. The only building to survive intact is the Abbot's Kitchen, which served as a Quaker meeting house. Early in the 19th century, gunpowder was used to dislodge further stones and the site became a quarry. The Ancient Monuments Protection Act 1882 stopped further damage to the site and led to the first historical and archaeological surveys.

=== Modern history ===
The ruins of Glastonbury Abbey were purchased by the Bath and Wells Diocesan Trust in 1908. The ruins are now the property of and managed by the Glastonbury Abbey trust. On acquiring the site the trust appointed Frederick Bligh Bond to direct an archaeological investigation. Bond discovered the Edgar Chapel, North Porch and St Dunstan's Chapel, however relations with his employers turned sour when he revealed in his 1919 book, The Gates of Remembrance, that he had made many of his interpretations in collaboration with a psychic medium. He was dismissed by Dean Armitage Robinson in 1921, because of his use of seances and psychic archaeology but is remembered as the man who "galvanised our cultural understanding of Glastonbury".

A pilgrimage to the ruins of Glastonbury Abbey was held by a few local churches in 1924. Pilgrimages continue today to be held; in the second half of June for the Anglicans and early in July for the Catholics and they attract visitors from all over Western Europe. Services are celebrated in the Anglican, Roman Catholic and Eastern Orthodox traditions. The abbey site is visited by over 100,000 a year.

=== Architecture ===
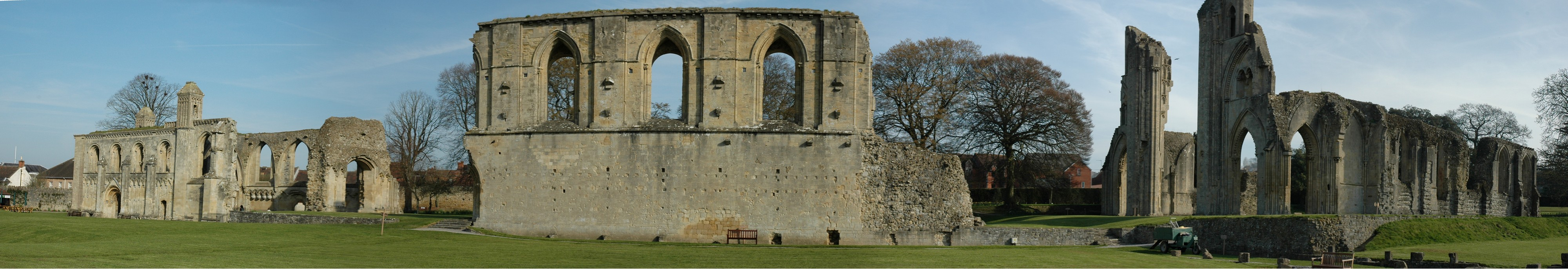
A panoramic view from the south of the ruins showing, from left to right, extant sections of the Lady Chapel, nave wall, crossing tower, and choir wall

The ruins of the great church, along with the Lady Chapel, are grade I listed buildings, and a scheduled monument. It is set in 36 acres (150,000 m^{2}) of parkland and open to the public. It is approached by the abbey gatehouse, which was built in the mid 14th century and completely restored in 1810. The 14th century abbey barn is also open to the public, outside the walls, as part of the Somerset Rural Life Museum.

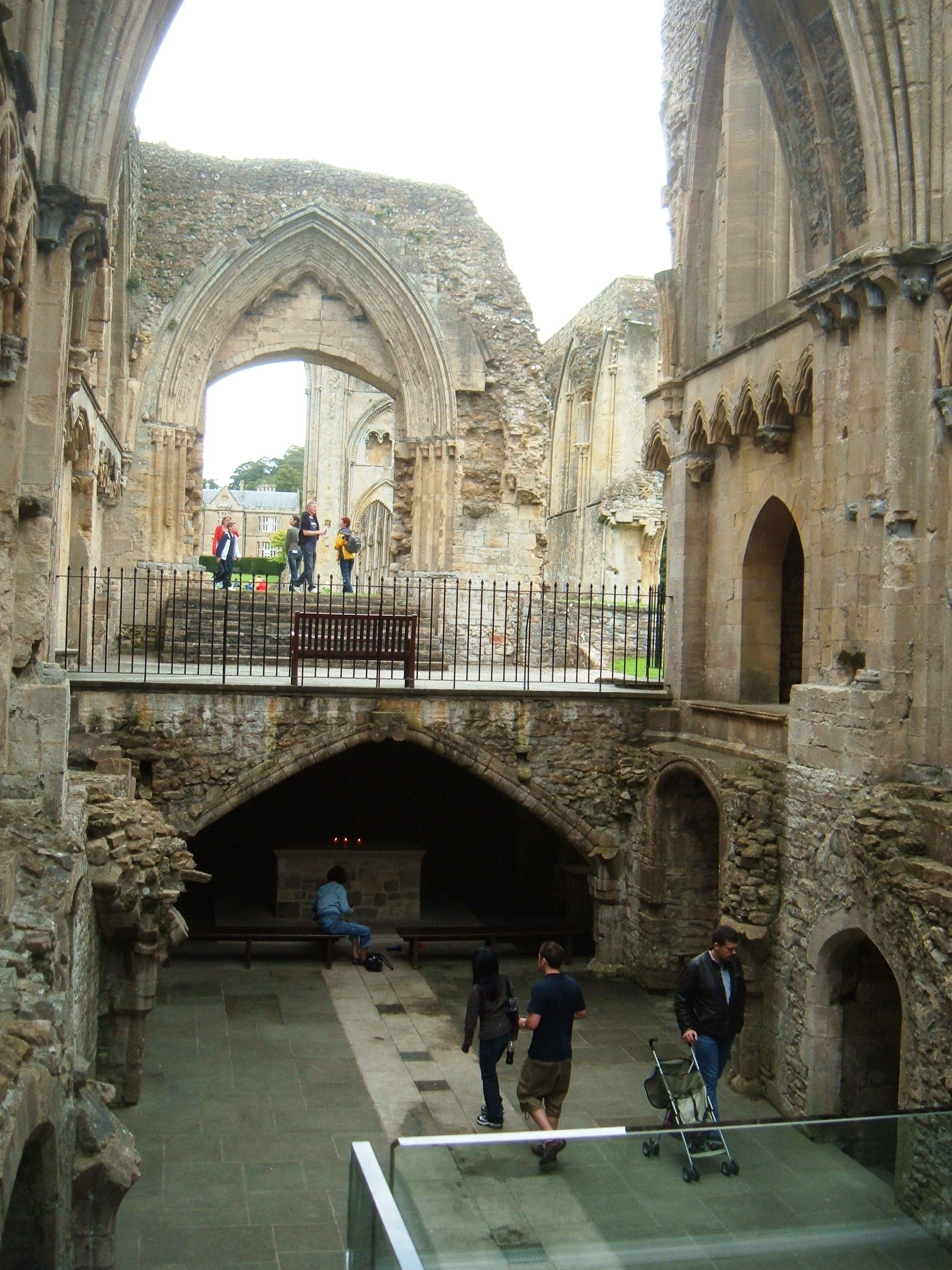
Lady Chapel interior

The great church was 220 feet (67 m) in length and 45 feet (14 m) wide. The choir was 155 feet (47 m) long and the transept was 160 feet (49 m) long. St Joseph's chapel was 110 feet (34 m) long and 24 feet (7.3 m) wide. The remaining portions are of the clerestory and triforium arcades, which were the supports of the central square tower. Other fragments of structures which remain include portions of the outer walls of the chancel aisles and the 14th century retroquire. There is also surviving stonework from the south nave aisle wall, west front and the Galilee along with its crypt linked to St Mary's Chapel. The Lady Chapel, from which the walls survive, was described in 1478 as being 34 yards (31 m) in length and 8 yards (7.3 m) wide.

The Abbot's Kitchen is described as "one of the best preserved medieval kitchens in Europe". The 14th century octagonal building is supported by curved buttresses on each side leading up to a cornice with grotesque gargoyles. Inside are four large arched fireplaces with smoke outlets above them, with another outlet in the centre of the pyramidal roof. The kitchen was attached to the 80 feet (24 m) high abbot's hall, although only one small section of its wall remains.

The analysis of the 20th-century archaeological investigations have recently been published along with the results of a new geophysical survey.

=== Library ===
The abbey library was described by John Leland, King Henry VIII's antiquary who visited it, as containing unique copies of ancient histories of England and unique early Christian documents. It seems to have been affected by the fire of 1184, but still housed a remarkable collection until 1539 when it was dispersed at the Dissolution of the Monasteries. Around 40 of the manuscripts from Glastonbury are known to have survived after the dissolution.

=== Abbey House ===
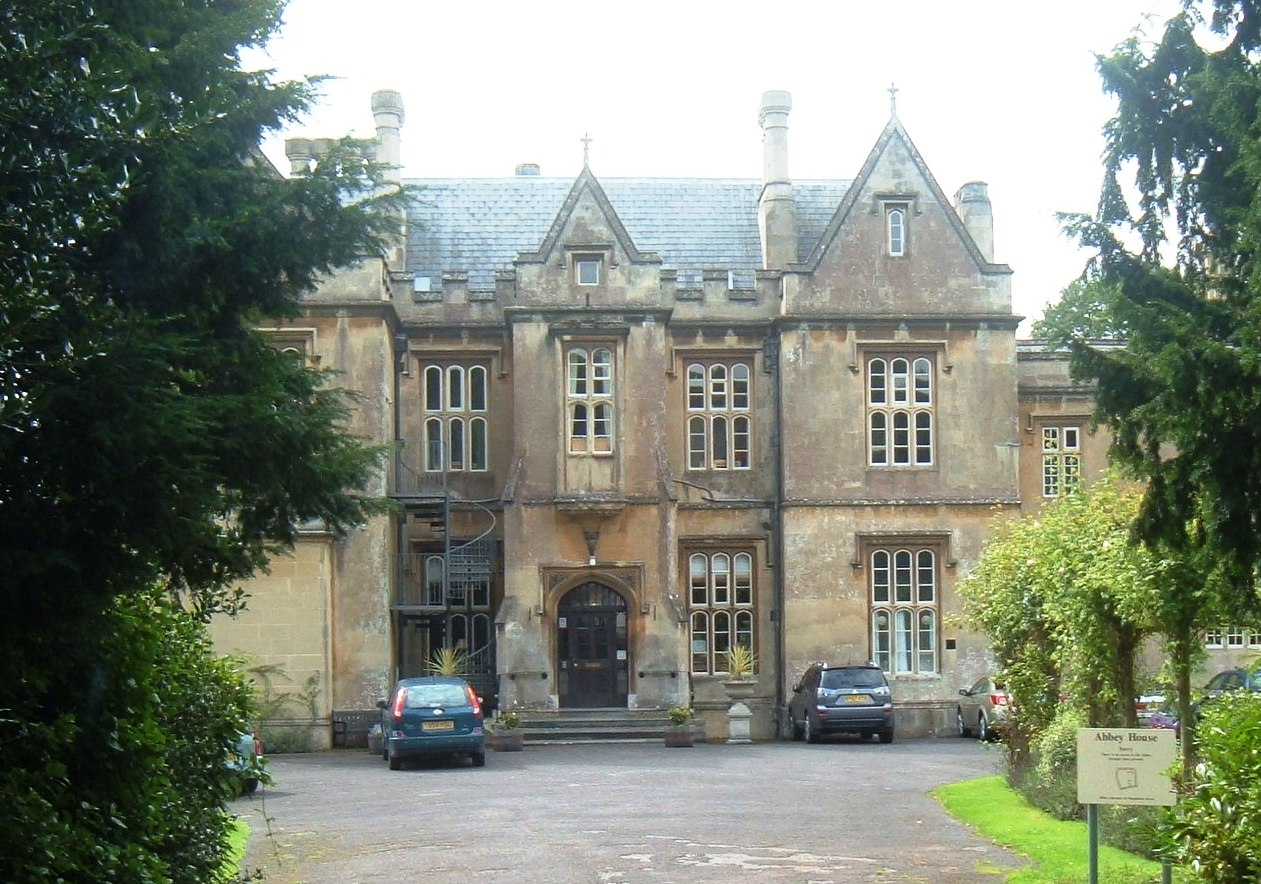
Abbey House

Within the abbey wall is Abbey House, which was used by the Diocese of Bath and Wells as a retreat house from 1931 until 2018. It is now occasionally open to the public for special events and provides additional administration space for the Abbey.

The Tudor Gothic house was built between 1829 and 1830 by John Buckler from the stones of the abbey ruins for John Fry Reeves. It was altered and extended between 1850 and 1860, with further alterations in 1957.

== Other burials ==
- Ælfhere, Ealdorman of Mercia
- Indract of Glastonbury and his sister Saint Drusa
- Edgar the Peaceful
- Edmund I
- Ealdgyth (wife of Edmund Ironside)
- Edmund II
- Humphrey Stafford, 1st Earl of Devon
- Richard Beere
- Eosterwine
- Hwaetberht

William of Malmesbury suggested that relics relating to others, including the following, were deposited at Glastonbury:

- St Oswald, King of Northumbria c 604, r. 630/40
- Balthild of Chelles, Queen consort of Burgundy c 626-680
- Aelfflaed, second wife of Edward the Elder, King of the Anglo Saxons (father of Edmund) early C10

== Glastonbury Thorn ==
A specimen of common hawthorn found at Glastonbury, first mentioned in an early 16th-century anonymous metrical Lyfe of Joseph of Arimathea, was unusual in that it flowered twice in a year, once as normal on "old wood" in spring, and once on "new wood" (the current season's matured new growth) in the winter. This tree has been widely propagated by grafting or cuttings, with the cultivar name 'Biflora' or 'Praecox'. The custom of sending a budded branch of the Glastonbury thorn to the Queen at Christmas was initiated by James Montague, Bishop of Bath and Wells during James I's reign, who sent a branch to Queen Anne, King James I's consort. Trees survive from earlier grafts to perpetuate the Glastonbury legend, among them two other Holy Thorns in the grounds of St John's Church in Glastonbury. The blossom sent to the Queen now comes from one of these.

== See also ==
- Abbot's Kitchen, Glastonbury – Medieval building in Glastonbury, England
- Abbot of Glastonbury – List of medieval abbots of Glastonbury Abbey in England
- Adam of Damerham – 13th-century English Benedictine monk and historian
- List of monastic houses in Somerset
- Late medieval domes – Domes in religious architecture in the Late Middle Ages

== Bibliography ==
- Abrams, Lesley; Carley, James P. (1991). The Archaeology and History of Glastonbury Abbey: Essays in Honour of the ninetieth birthday of C. A. Ralegh Radford. Boydell Press. ISBN 978-0-85115-284-4.
- Ashe, Geoffrey (1960). From Caesar to Arthur. Collins.
- Bond, Frederick Bligh (1920). An Architectural Handbook of Glastonbury Abbey with a Historical Chronicle of the Building. Kessinger. ISBN 978-1-4179-7776-5.
- Carley, James P. (1988). Glastonbury Abbey: The Holy House at the Head of the Moors Adventurous. Guild Publishing. ISBN 978-0-85115-460-2.
- Carley, James P.; Townsend, David (2009). Chronicle of Glastonbury Abbey An Edition, Translation and Study of John of Glastonbury's Cronica sive Antiquitates: An Edition, Translation and Study ... Sive Antiquatates Glastoniensis Ecclesie. Boydell Press. ISBN 978-0-85115-859-4.
- Carley, James P. (2001). Glastonbury Abbey and the Arthurian Tradition (preview). D. S. Brewer. ISBN 978-0-85991-572-4.
- Crake, A. D. (1915). The Last Abbot of Glastonbury. A R Mowbray.
- Dowling, John (1845). The History of Romanism: from the earliest corruptions of Christianity to the present time (4th ed.). New York: Edward Walker.
- Gasquet, Francis Aidan (1908). Last Abbot of Glastonbury and Other Essays. Kessinger Publishing Co. ISBN 978-0-7661-6289-1.
- Gilchrist, Roberta; Green, Cheryl (2015). Glastonbury Abbey: archaeological investigations 1904–79. London: Society of Antiquaries of London. ISBN 9780854313006.
- Harris, Kate (1992). Glastonbury Abbey Records at Longleat House: A Summary List. Somerset Record Society. ISBN 978-0-901732-29-3.
- Harris, Oliver D. (2018). "'Which I have beholden with most curiouse eyes': the lead cross from Glastonbury Abbey". Arthurian Literature. 34: 88–129. doi:10.1017/9781787442535.006. ISBN 978-1-84384-483-9. S2CID 200168947.
- Havinden, Michael (1981). The Somerset Landscape. The making of the English landscape. London: Hodder and Stoughton. ISBN 978-0-340-20116-9.
- Hill, Rosemary (2009). Stonehenge. Profile Books. ISBN 978-1-86197-880-6.
- Hollinrake, Charles; Hollinrake, Nancy (2007). "Glastonbury's Canal and Dunstan's Dyke". In Blair, John (ed.). Waterways and Canal Building in Medieval England. Oxford: Oxford University Press. ISBN 978-0-19-921715-1.
- Knowles, David (2004). The Monastic Order in England: A History of its Development from the Times of St Dunstan to the Fourth Lateran Council 940–1216. Cambridge University Press. ISBN 978-0-521-54808-3.
- Knowles, David; Brooke, C. N. L.; London, Vera C. M. (2005). The Heads of Religious Houses England and Wales, I 940–1216. Cambridge University Press. ISBN 978-0-511-02872-4.
- Lance, Ron W.; O'Kennon, Robert J.; Phipps, James B. (2003). Hawthorns and Medlars (Royal Horticultural Society Plant Collector Guide). Timber Press. ISBN 978-0-88192-591-3.
- Rahtz, Philip; Watts, Lorna (2003). Glastonbury: Myth and Archaeology. Stroud: History Press. ISBN 978-0-7524-2548-1.
- Rouse, Robert Allen; Rushton, Cory (2005). The Medieval Quest for Arthur. Stroud: History Press. ISBN 978-0-7524-3343-1.
- Searle, Muriel V. (2002). West Country History: Somerset. Bristol: Venton Publications. ISBN 978-1-84150-802-3.
- White, Richard (1997). King Arthur in Legend and History. London: Dent. ISBN 978-0460879156.
- Williams, Michael (1970). The Draining of the Somerset Levels. Cambridge: Cambridge University Press. ISBN 978-0-521-07486-5.
- Willis, Robert (1866). The Architectural History of Glastonbury Abbey. Cambridge: Deighton, Bell.
