= Abbot's Kitchen, Glastonbury =

Medieval building in Glastonbury, England

Coordinates: 51°08′45″N 2°43′00″W

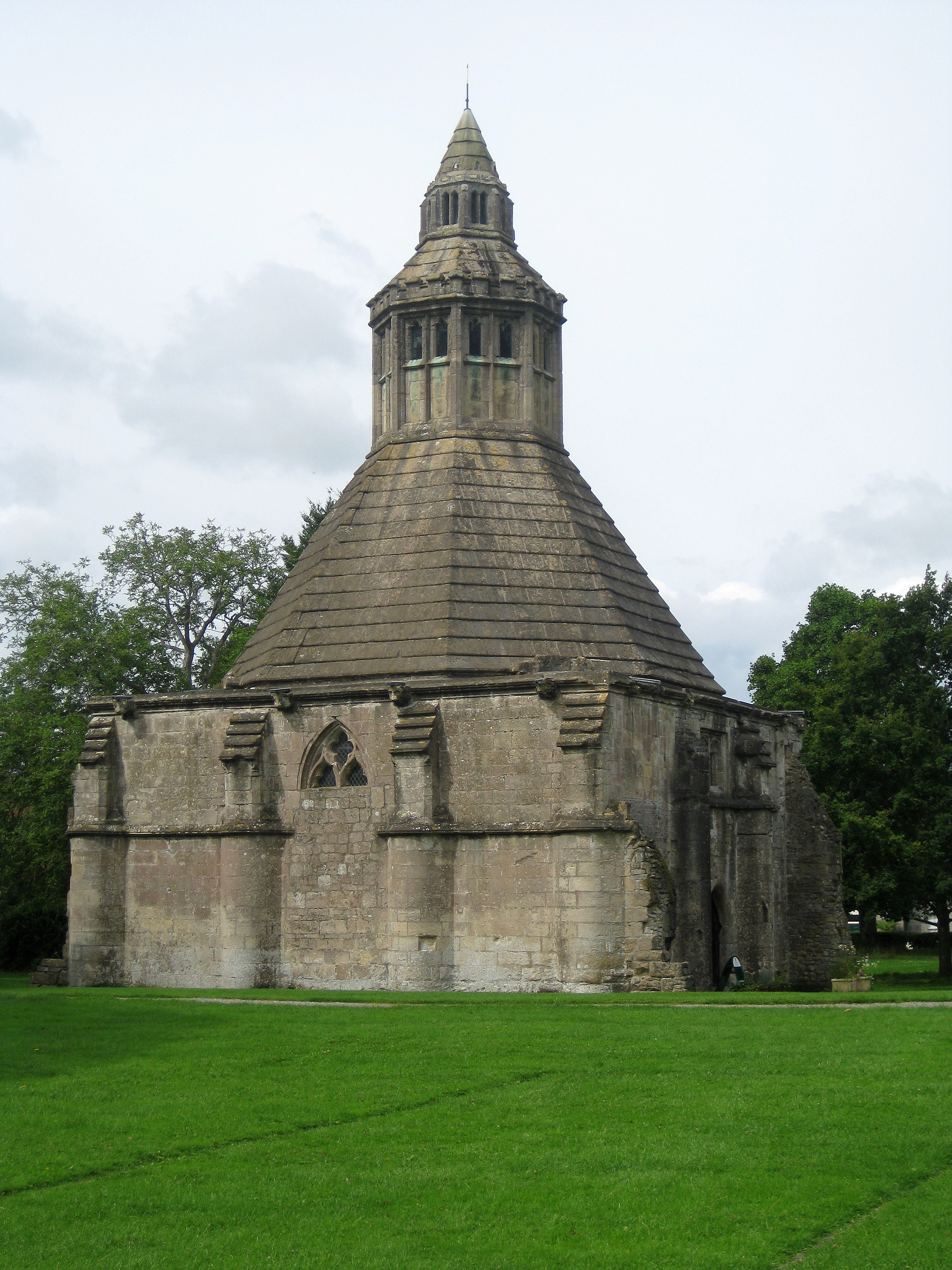
The Abbot's Kitchen, 2009

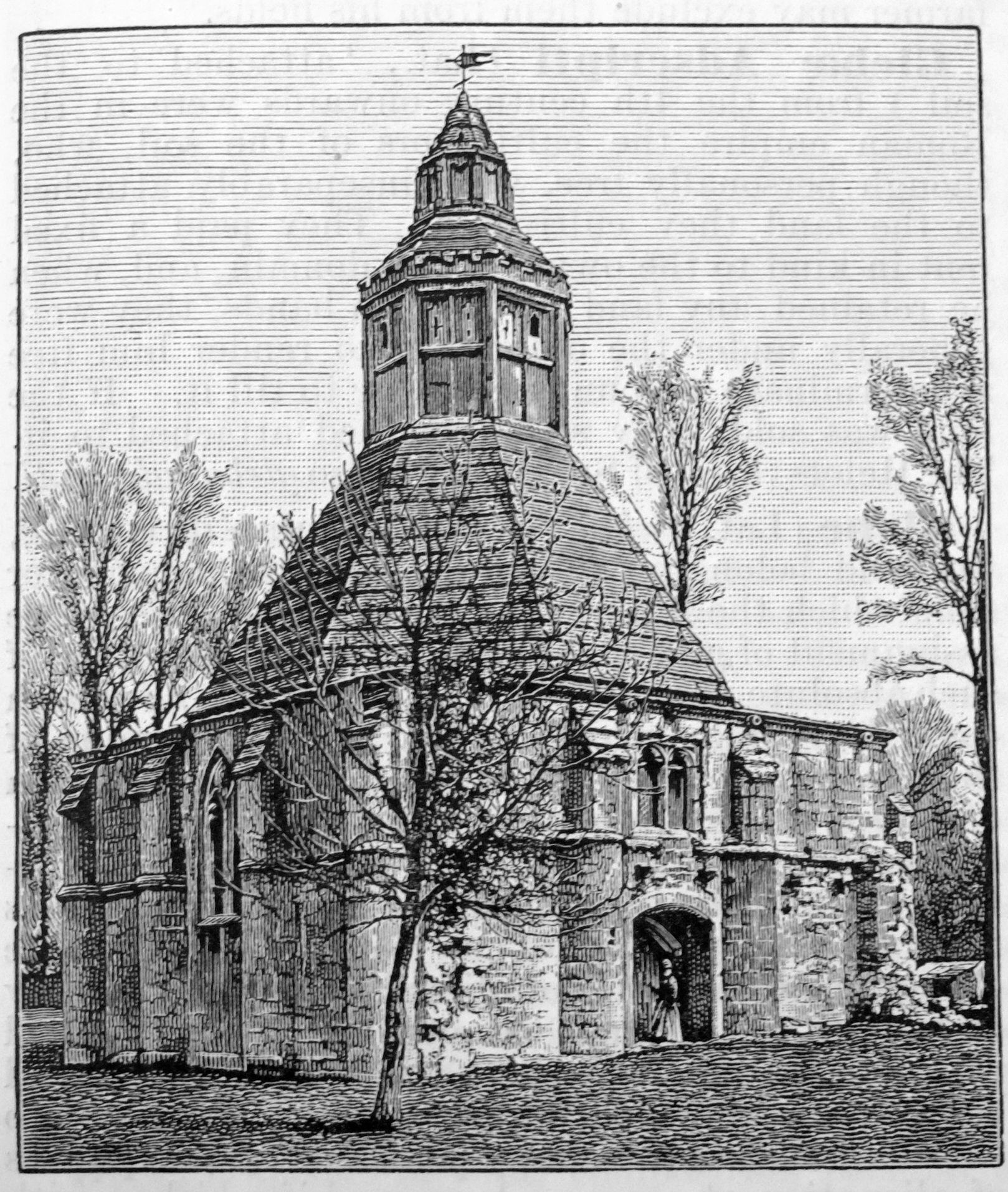
The Abbot's Kitchen, 1890

The Abbot's Kitchen is a mediaeval octagonal building that served as the kitchen at Glastonbury Abbey in Glastonbury, Somerset, England. It is a Grade I listed building. The abbot's kitchen has been described as "one of the best preserved medieval kitchens in Europe". The stone-built construction dates from the 14th century and is one of a very few surviving mediaeval kitchens in the world.

Historically, the Abbot of Glastonbury lived well, as demonstrated by the abbot's kitchen, with four large fireplaces at its corners. The kitchen was part of the opulent abbot's house, begun under Abbot John de Breynton (1334–1342). It is one of the best preserved medieval kitchens in Europe and the only substantial monastic building surviving at Glastonbury Abbey. The abbot's kitchen has been the only building at Glastonbury Abbey to survive intact. Later it was used as a Quaker meeting house.

The building is supported by curved buttresses on each side leading up to a cornice with grotesque gargoyles. Inside are four large arched fireplaces with smoke outlets above them, with another outlet in the centre of the pyramidal roof. The building is designed so that hot air from the cooking fires would have risen up to the top of the building and escaped, whilst cooler air came from openings lower down and sunk into the kitchen, cooling it.

The kitchen was attached to the 80 feet (24 m) high abbot's hall, although only one small section of its wall remains. The architect Augustus Pugin surveyed and recorded the building in the 1830s. The Abbot's Kitchen was again surveyed and conserved in 2013, reopening in 2014.

== See also ==
- Abbot's Kitchen, Oxford, based on the one at Glastonbury
- List of octagonal buildings and structures
