= Dverberg Church =

- Dverberg kirke
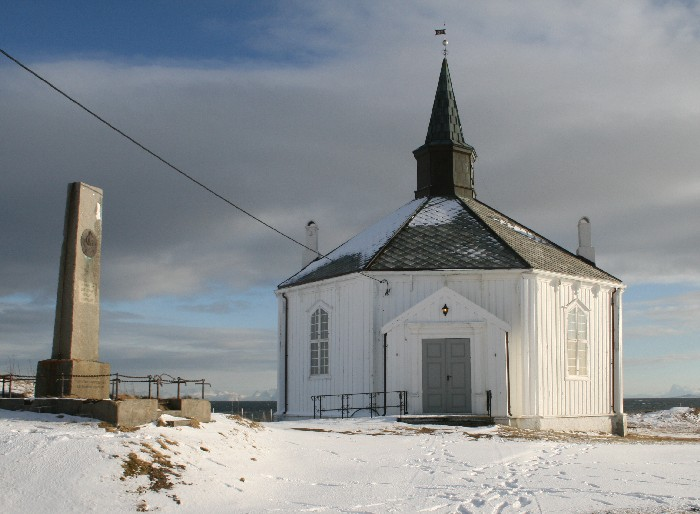
- View of the church
- Dverberg Church
- 69.1139°N 15.9817°E
- Location: Andøy Municipality, Nordland
- Country: Norway
- Denomination: Church of Norway
- Churchmanship: Evangelical Lutheran

History
- Status: Parish church
- Founded: 1500s
- Consecrated: 17 Oct 1843

Architecture
- Functional status: Active
- Architect: Christian Heinrich Grosch
- Architectural type: Octagonal
- Completed: 1843 (183 years ago)

Specifications
- Capacity: 230
- Materials: Wood

Administration
- Diocese: Sør-Hålogaland
- Deanery: Vesterålen prosti
- Parish: Andøy
- Norwegian Cultural Heritage Site
- Type: Church
- Status: Listed
- ID: 84040

Dverberg Church (Norwegian: Dverberg kirke) is a parish church of the Church of Norway in Andøy Municipality in Nordland county, Norway. It is located in the village of Dverberg on the island of Andøya. It is one of the churches for the Andøy parish which is part of the Vesterålen prosti (deanery) in the Diocese of Sør-Hålogaland. The white, wooden church was built in an octagonal style in 1843 using plans drawn up by the architect Christian Heinrich Grosch. The church seats about 230 people.

== History ==
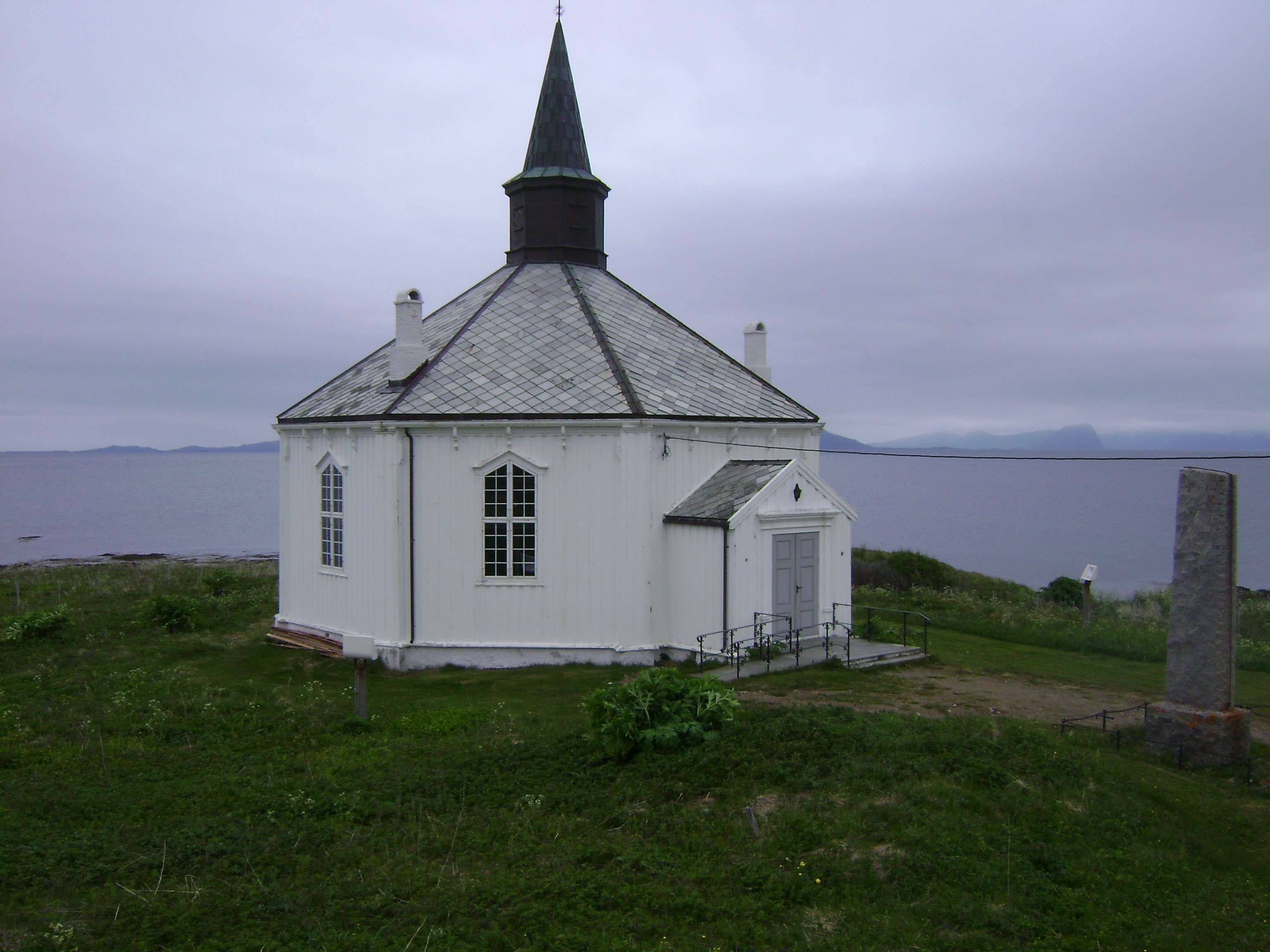
View of the church

The earliest existing historical records show that there was a Dverberg Church in 1589, but it was not new at that time. In 1658, the church in Dverberg underwent a major repair of the south and west walls. In 1734, the church was struck by lightning and severely damaged by the resulting fire. Between 1735 and 1750 a new church was built on the same site. This new building was a timber-framed cruciform building. The church was repaired in 1794 once again.

In 1814, this church served as an election church (Norwegian: valgkirke). Together with more than 300 other parish churches across Norway, it was a polling station for elections to the 1814 Norwegian Constituent Assembly which wrote the Constitution of Norway. This was Norway's first national elections. Each church parish was a constituency that elected people called "electors" who later met together in each county to elect the representatives for the assembly that was to meet at Eidsvoll Manor later that year.

In 1839, it was decided to build a new church building since it was no longer possible to repair the existing building. It was decided that the new church would not be located on the same location as the previous buildings. Instead, it would be located about 300 metres (980 ft) to the south on a small peninsula. This new church was an octagonal timber church that was completed in 1843. The new building was consecrate on 17 October 1843. In 1930, there was a major restoration. Augustinus Johannessøn Sellevold (1803-1893) who was a member of the Norwegian Parliament from Nordland and Arctic explorer Torstein Raaby were both buried in the church cemetery.

== See also ==
- List of churches in Sør-Hålogaland
- Octagonal churches in Norway
