= Bald notothen =

Scientific classification
- Kingdom: Animalia
- Phylum: Chordata
- Class: Actinopterygii
- Order: Perciformes
- Family: Nototheniidae
- Genus: Pagothenia
- Species: P. borchgrevinki

Binomial name
- Pagothenia borchgrevinki (Boulenger, 1902)

Synonyms
- Trematomus borchgrevinki Boulenger, 1902; Notothenia hodgsoni Boulenger, 1907

Species of fish

The bald notothen (Pagothenia borchgrevinki), also known as the bald rockcod, is a species of marine ray-finned fish belonging to the family Nototheniidae, the notothens or cod icefishes. It is native to the Southern Ocean.

== Taxonomy ==
The bald notothen was first formally described in 1907 as Trematomus borchgrevinki by the Belgian-born British ichthyologist George Albert Boulenger with the type localities given as at the surface at Duke of York Island and at Cape Adare. The specific name honours Carsten Egeberg Borchgrevink who commanded the British Southern Cross Antarctic Expedition (1898–1900), during which types were collected.

== Description ==
The bald notothen attains a maximum total length around 28 cm (11 in), it is yellow with dark spots and irregular crossbars. Its dorsal and caudal fins may occasionally also be spotted.

== Distribution, habitat and biology ==
The bald notothen is found in the Southern Ocean where it has been recorded from the Weddell Sea, the Ross Sea, the Davis Sea, in Vincennes Bay, and around the Budd Coast, the Antarctic Peninsula, South Orkneys, and South Shetland Islands. It can be found at depths from the surface to 550 m (1,800 ft), though it is much rarer below 30 m (98 ft). This species is cryopelagic and is often found along the under surfaces of ice foraging for prey such as sympagic copepods and krill. In turn, it is known to be preyed upon by the ploughfish (Gymnodraco acuticeps) and the Antarctic toothfish (Dissostichus mawsoni). Antifreeze proteins in its blood prevent it freezing in the subzero water temperatures of Antarctica. The bald notothen is adapted to life in the water column as the shape and flatness of the trunk may streamline the fish and reduce drag. The pelvic and anal fins do not have the adaptations for substrate contact borne by related benthic species. There are silvery reflective layers, called strata argentea below the skin which provide camouflage when the fish is seen against the background of platelet ice. The retina had numerous cones suggesting that the eye is able to function during the day and at night. Sexually mature individuals of this species spawn once a year. The larvae have a long pelagic phase.

== Fisheries ==
The bald notothen is of no interest to commercial fisheries.
