= Per Savio =

Norwegian polar explorer

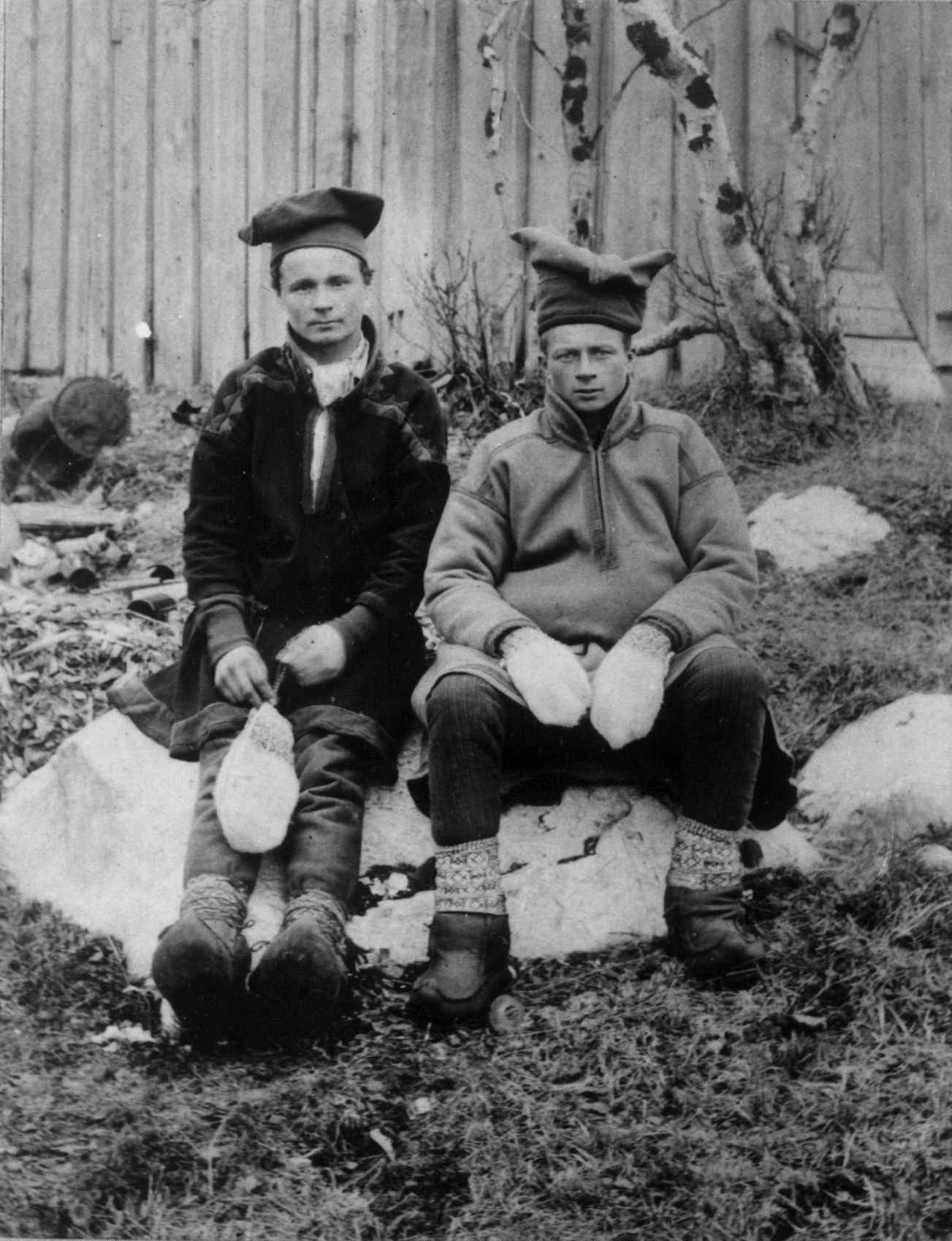
- Ole Must and Per Savio c. 1898
- Born: Per John Savio; 16 October 1879; Sør-Varanger, Norway
- Died: 10 October 1905 (aged 25); Varangerfjord, Norway
- Occupations: Polar explorer, dog sled driver
- Known for: Southern Cross expedition

Per John Savio (16 October 1879 – 10 October 1905) was a Norwegian polar explorer and dog sled driver. As a member of the Southern Cross expedition 1898–1900, Savio together with Ole Must were the first to overnight on the Antarctic continent. He was also part of the sled team who were the first persons to travel on the Ross Ice Shelf and reaching a new Farthest South record.

== Biography ==
Per John Johansen Savio was born in Sør-Varanger Municipality in Finnmark county, Norway. He was a member of a Sami family. He was 21 years old when he joined the "Southern Cross" vessel to Antarctica in 1898. He married Else Josefsdatter Strimp, daughter of the Sami merchant Josef Strimp in the village of Bugøynes. They had three children together, of whom only their son John Savio (1902–1938) reached adulthood and became a famous Sami artist.

== Southern Cross expedition ==
The Southern Cross expedition was the first British discovery voyage in the Heroic Age of Antarctic Exploration and a forerunner of the more famous expeditions of Robert Falcon Scott, Ernest Shackleton, and Roald Amundsen. It was the Norwegian-born, half-English explorer and schoolmaster Carsten Borchgrevink who had the idea for and led the expedition. Ten expedition members were to spend the night at Cape Adare on the Ross Sea, and Borchgrevink had selected the two Sami—Per Savio and Ole Must—as dog sledders. The plan was to use the dogs on sleigh rides across the continent.

The expedition arrived at Cape Adare, where Borchgrevink had been ashore during the expedition of 1894–1895, on 17 February 1899. The 75 dogs were sent ashore first with their Sami caretakers, and the two thus became the first to spend a night on the Antarctic continent.

At Cape Adare, an extensive scientific program was carried out, but the opportunities for further exploration of the hinterland were severely limited by the mountainous terrain with many glaciers surrounding the camp. They then explored the Ross Sea along the same route that James Clark Ross had followed 60 years earlier. After reaching the Great Ice Barrier, a group of three consisting of Borchgrevink, Savio and William Colbeck became the first to make a sleigh ride on the barrier surface. They reached 78° 50′S, the southernmost point until then reached by humans, earning Amundsen's approbation: "We must acknowledge that, by ascending the Barrier, Borchgrevink opened the way to the south, and threw aside the greatest obstacle to the expeditions that followed".

Borchgrevink later described Savio as "recognized for his loyal nature, boldness and intelligence."
