= Heroic Age of Antarctic Exploration =

Period of history from the 1890s to the 1920s

Left to right: Roald Amundsen, Helmer Hanssen, Sverre Hassel and Oscar Wisting after first reaching the South Pole on 16 December 1911.

The Heroic Age of Antarctic Exploration was an era in the exploration of the continent of Antarctica which began at the end of the 19th century, and ended after the First World War; the Shackleton–Rowett Expedition of 1921–1922 is often cited by historians as the dividing line between the "Heroic" and "Mechanical" ages.

During the Heroic Age, the Antarctic region became the focus of international efforts that resulted in intensive scientific and geographical exploration by 17 major Antarctic expeditions launched from ten countries. The common factor in these expeditions was the limited nature of the resources available to them before advances in transport and communication technologies revolutionized the work of exploration. Each of these expeditions therefore became a feat of endurance that tested, and sometimes exceeded, the physical and mental limits of its personnel. The "heroic" label, bestowed later, recognized the adversities which had to be overcome by these pioneers, some of whom did not survive the experience: a total of 22 expedition members died during this period.

Both the geographic and magnetic South Poles were reached for the first time during the Heroic Age. The achievement of being first to the geographical pole was the primary object in many expeditions, as well as the sole rationale for Roald Amundsen's venture, which became the first to reach it in 1911. Other expeditions aimed for different objectives in different areas of the continent. As a result of all this activity, much of the continent's coastline was discovered and mapped, and significant areas of its interior were explored. The expeditions also generated large quantities of scientific data across a wide range of disciplines, the examination and analysis of which would keep the world's scientific communities busy for decades.

== Origins ==
Terra Australis
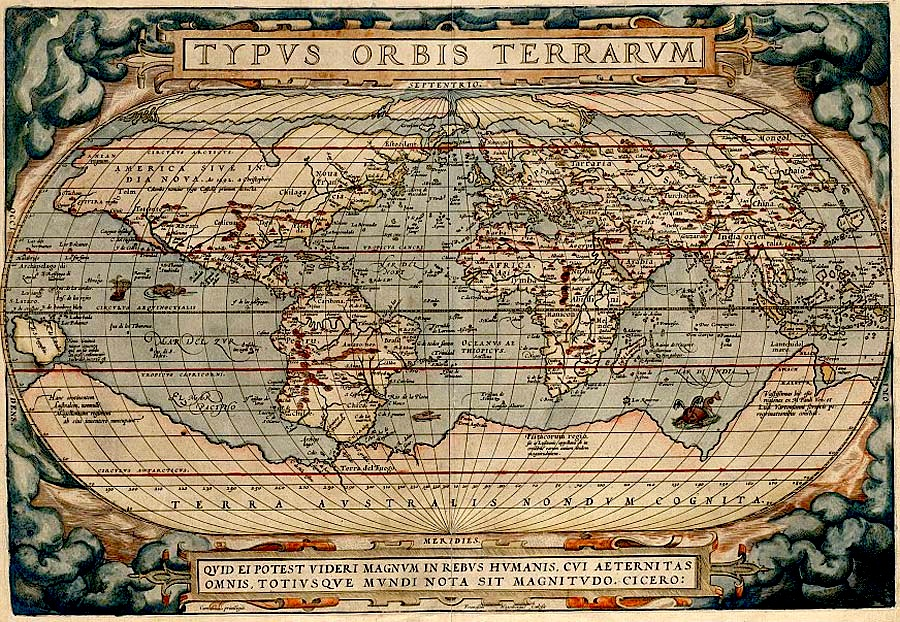
- "Terra Australis Nondum Cognita" is the large continent on the bottom of this 1570 map by Abraham Ortelius

In-universe information
- Type: Hypothetical continent

Exploration of the southernmost part of the globe had been an off-and-on area of interest for centuries prior to the Heroic Age, yet the sheer isolation of the region as well as its inhospitable climate and treacherous seas presented enormous practical difficulties for early maritime technology. About a century after the Age of Exploration, British explorer James Cook became one of the first explorers known to have traveled to the region. The discoveries of his second voyage (1772–1775) changed the world map forever. Prior to this expedition it was believed that a large continent known as Terra Australis occupied the majority of the Southern Hemisphere. Cook discovered that no such landmass existed, though massive ice floes prevented his reaching Antarctica proper. In the process his expedition became the first recorded voyage to cross the Antarctic Circle. He did hypothesize that, based upon the amount of ice, there must be a landmass from which the ice originated, but was convinced that if it existed this land was too far south to be either habitable or of any economic value. Subsequently, exploration of the southern regions of the world came to a halt.

Interest was renewed again between 1819 and 1843. As Europe settled after a period of war and unrest, explorers Fabian Gottlieb von Bellingshausen, John Biscoe, John Balleny, Charles Wilkes, Jules Dumont d'Urville, and James Clark Ross sought greater knowledge of the Antarctic regions. The primary goal of these explorers was to penetrate the vast barriers of sea ice that hid Antarctica proper, beginning with Bellingshausen and Mikhail Lazarev's circumnavigation of the region in 1819–1821, during which they became the first to sight and therefore officially discover mainland Antarctica, and culminating in Wilkes' discovery of Victoria Land and naming of the volcanoes now known as Mount Terror and Mount Erebus in 1840. Much early knowledge of the lands south of the Antarctic Circle was also derived from economic pursuits by sealers and whalers, including the probable first landing on mainland Antarctica by an American sealer in 1821, though whether this landing was truly the first is disputed by historians. These explorers, despite their impressive contributions to South Polar exploration, were nonetheless unable to penetrate the interior of the continent, and their discoveries instead formed a broken line of newly discovered lands along the coastline of Antarctica.

Antarctic Region, 1848
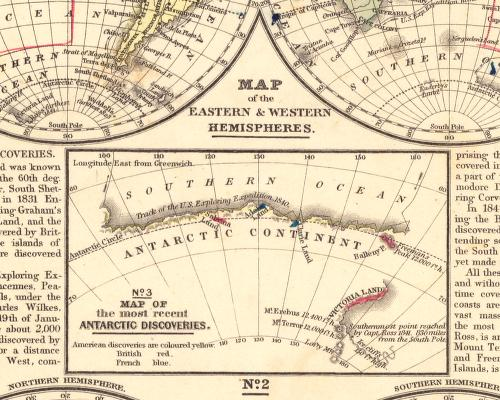
- The known Antarctic region after the 1819–1843 period of intensive exploration.

What followed this early period of exploration is what historian H. R. Mill called "the age of averted interest". Following James Clark Ross' expedition aboard the ships HMS Erebus and HMS Terror in January 1841, Ross suggested that there were no scientific discoveries worth exploration in the far south. It has been suggested that Ross' influence, as well as the widely publicized loss of the Franklin expedition in the Arctic in 1848, led to a period of disinterest, or at least an unwillingness to invest significant resources, in polar inquiry, particularly by the Royal Society. In the twenty years following Ross' return, there was a general lull internationally in Antarctic exploration.

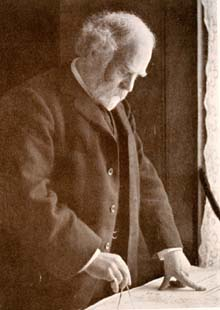
The oceanographer Sir John Murray

The initial impetus for the renewed exploration of the Antarctic that became known as the Heroic Age of Antarctic Exploration is somewhat contested, as it was a vague and multifarious international movement. George von Neumayer of Hamburg, also an Antarctic explorer, helped to renew Antarctic exploration from 1861 onward while he worked in an observatory in Melbourne. His particular interests were the importance of meteorology and how more information about the South Pole could lead to more accurate weather predictions. This helps explain German involvement in Antarctic research. Another important precursor to the Heroic Age of Antarctic exploration was the Dundee Antarctic Expedition of 1892–93 in which four Dundee whaling ships travelled south to the Antarctic in search of whales instead of their usual Arctic route. The expedition was accompanied by several naturalists (including Williams Speirs Bruce) and an artist, William Gordon Burn Murdoch. The publications (both scientific and popular) and exhibitions that resulted did much to reignite public interest in the Antarctic. The performance of the whaling ships was also crucial in the decision to build RRS Discovery in Dundee.

Another, particularly British, impetus more closely tied to the period is a lecture given by John Murray titled "The Renewal of Antarctic Exploration", given to the Royal Geographical Society in London, on 27 November 1893. Murray advocated that research into the Antarctic should be organised to "resolve the outstanding geographical questions still posed in the south". Shortly prior to this, in 1887, the Royal Geographical Society had instated an Antarctic Committee which successfully incited many whalers to explore the southern regions of the world and foregrounded the lecture given by Murray. In August 1895, the Sixth International Geographical Congress in London passed a general resolution calling on scientific societies throughout the world to promote the cause of Antarctic exploration "in whatever ways seem to them most effective". Such work, the resolution argued, would "bring additions to almost every branch of science". The Congress was addressed by the Norwegian Carsten Borchgrevink, who had just returned from a whaling expedition during which he had become one of the first people to set foot on the Antarctic mainland. During his address, Borchgrevink outlined plans for a full-scale pioneering Antarctic expedition, to be based at Cape Adare.

However, the inauguration of the Heroic Age is now generally considered to be an expedition launched by the Société Royale Belge de Géographie in 1897; Carsten Borchgrevink followed a year later with a privately sponsored expedition. The designation "Heroic Age" only came much later; the term is not used in any of the early expedition accounts or memoirs, nor in biographies of polar figures involved in the Heroic Age which appeared in the 1920s and 1930s. It is not clear when the term was first coined or adopted generally. It was used in March 1956 by the British explorer Duncan Carse, writing in The Times. Describing the first crossing of South Georgia by Ernest Shackleton's Imperial Trans-Antarctic Expedition in 1916, Carse wrote of "three men from the heroic age of Antarctic exploration, with 50 feet of rope between them, and a carpenter's adze".

== Expeditions, 1897–1922 ==
Notes

1. The summaries in the table do not include the scientific work carried out by these expeditions, each of which brought back findings and specimens across a wide range of disciplines.
2. The table does not include the numerous whaling voyages that took place during this period, or sub-Antarctic expeditions such as that of Carl Chun in 1898–1899, which did not penetrate the Antarctic Circle. Also excluded is the Cope Expedition of 1920–1922, which collapsed through lack of funding, though two men were landed from a Norwegian whaler and spent a year on the Antarctic peninsula. Three expeditions scheduled to start in 1914 were cancelled due to the outbreak of the First World War: an Austrian Antarctic Expedition to be led by Felix König; an Anglo-Swedish expedition under Otto Nordenskjöld and Johan Gunnar Andersson, and a British expedition under Joseph Foster Stackhouse.
3. † Denotes that leader died during expedition.

Dates	Country	Expedition name(s)	Ship(s)	Leader		Expedition summary	Refs
1897–1899	Belgium	Belgian Antarctic Expedition	Belgica	A bearded man of about 30 years in fur hat and winter coat.	Adrien de Gerlache	This was the first expedition to overwinter south of the Antarctic Circle, after the ship was icebound in the Bellingshausen Sea. It collected the first annual cycle of Antarctic observations. It also reached 71°30'S, and discovered the Gerlache Strait. First Mate Roald Amundsen would later lead the first arrival at the South Pole, in 1911.	
1898–1900	UK	British Antarctic Expedition 1898 (Southern Cross Expedition)	Southern Cross	A man with moustache in a winter coat with a hat covering his ears.	Carsten Borchgrevink	The first expedition to overwinter on the Antarctic mainland (Cape Adare), Borchgrevink's expedition was the first to make use of dogs and sledges. It made the first ascent of the Great Ice Barrier, and set a Farthest South record at 78°30'S. It also calculated the location of the South Magnetic Pole.	
1901–1904	UK	National Antarctic Expedition 1901 (Discovery Expedition)	Discovery (main vessel); Morning (relief ship); Terra Nova (relief ship)	A man in ceremonial military uniform.	Robert Falcon Scott	It made the first ascent of the Western Mountains in Victoria Land, and discovered the polar plateau. Its southern journey set a new Farthest South record at 82°17'S. Many other geographical features were discovered, mapped, and named. This was the first of several expeditions based in McMurdo Sound.	
1901–1903	(German Empire) Germany	First German Antarctic Expedition (Gauss Expedition)	Gauss	A man with moustache in a smart dress.	Erich von Drygalski	The first expedition to investigate eastern Antarctica, it discovered the coast of Kaiser Wilhelm II Land, and Mount Gauss. The expedition's ship became trapped in ice, which prevented more extensive exploration.	
1901–1903	Sweden	Swedish Antarctic Expedition	Antarctic (main vessel); ARA Uruguay (support ship)	A middle-aged bearded man in a smart dress.	Otto Nordenskjöld	This expedition worked in the east coastal area of Graham Land. It was marooned on Snow Hill Island and Paulet Island in the Weddell Sea after the sinking of its expedition ship, and was later rescued by the Argentinian naval vessel ARA Uruguay.	
1902–1904	UK	Scottish National Antarctic Expedition	Scotia	A middle-aged bearded man wearing a tie, waistcoat and jacket.	William Speirs Bruce	The permanent Orcadas weather station in South Orkney Islands was established. The Weddell Sea was penetrated to 74°01'S, and the coastline of Coats Land was discovered, defining the sea's eastern limits.	
1903–1905	France	Third French Antarctic Expedition	Français	An older bearded man with a hat wearing a tie and coat. He is keeping a pile of papers or documents under his arm.	Jean-Baptiste Charcot	Originally intended as a relief expedition for the stranded Nordenskjöld party, the main work of this expedition was the mapping and charting of islands and the western coasts of Graham Land, on the Antarctic Peninsula. A section of the coast was explored, and named Loubet Land after the President of France.	
1907–1909	UK	British Antarctic Expedition 1907 (Nimrod Expedition)	Nimrod		Ernest Shackleton	The first expedition led by Shackleton. Based in McMurdo Sound, it pioneered the Beardmore Glacier route toward the South Pole, and the (limited) use of motorised transport. Its southern march reached 88°23'S, a new Farthest South record, just 97 geographical miles from the Pole. The Northern Party reached the location of the South Magnetic Pole.	
1908–1910	France	Fourth French Antarctic Expedition	Pourquoi-Pas? IV	An older bearded man with a hat wearing a tie and coat. He is keeping a pile of papers or documents under his arm.	Jean-Baptiste Charcot	This continued the work of the earlier French expedition with a general exploration of the Bellingshausen Sea, and the discovery of islands and other features, including Marguerite Bay, Charcot Island, Renaud Island, Mikkelsen Bay, and Rothschild Island.	
1910–1912	Japan	Japanese Antarctic Expedition	Kainan Maru	An Asian man in military uniform with a hat.	Nobu Shirase	The first non-European Antarctic expedition carried out a coastal exploration of King Edward VII Land, and investigated the eastern sector of the Great Ice Barrier, reaching 80°5'S.	
1910–1912	Norway	Amundsen's South Pole expedition	Fram	A bearded man wearing a bow tie and coat.	Roald Amundsen	Amundsen set up camp on the Great Ice Barrier, at the Bay of Whales. He discovered a new route to the polar plateau via the Axel Heiberg Glacier. Using this route, a party of five led by Amundsen became the first to successfully reach the geographic South Pole on 14 December 1911.	
1910–1913	UK	British Antarctic Expedition 1910 (Terra Nova Expedition)	Terra Nova	Man in winter coat wearing a balaclava or ski mask style headgear.	Robert Falcon Scott†	Scott's last expedition, based like his first in McMurdo Sound. Scott and four companions reached the geographic South Pole via the Beardmore route on 17 January 1912, 33 days after Amundsen. All five died on the return journey from the Pole through a combination of starvation and cold.	
1911–1913	(German Empire) Germany	Second German Antarctic Expedition	Deutschland	Middle-aged man wearing a tie, waistcoat and jacket.	Wilhelm Filchner	The main objective was to establish the nature of the geographical relationship between the Weddell and Ross seas. The expedition achieved the southernmost penetration of the Weddell Sea to date, reaching 77°45'S, and discovered the Luitpold Coast, Filchner-Ronne Ice Shelf, and Vahsel Bay. It failed to establish a shore base from which to conduct its explorations, and after a long drift in the Weddell Sea pack it returned to South Georgia.	
1911–1914	Australia and New Zealand	Australasian Antarctic Expedition	Aurora	Man wearing a tie, waistcoat and jacket.	Douglas Mawson	The expedition concentrated on the stretch of Antarctic coastline between Cape Adare and Mount Gauss, carrying out mapping and survey work on coastal and inland territories. Discoveries included Commonwealth Bay, Ninnis Glacier, Mertz Glacier, and Queen Mary Land.	
1914–1917	UK	Imperial Trans-Antarctic Expedition	Endurance	Bearded middle-aged man with a cowboy hat.	Ernest Shackleton	Shackleton's expedition attempted a transcontinental crossing between the Weddell and Ross seas via the South Pole, but failed to land the Weddell Sea shore party after Endurance was trapped and crushed in pack ice. The expedition then rescued itself after a series of exploits, including a prolonged drift on ice floes, a lifeboat escape to Elephant Island, an 800-mile open-boat journey to South Georgia Island, and the first crossing of South Georgia.	
1914–1917	UK	Ross Sea party In support of Imperial Trans-Antarctic Expedition	Aurora	A man in formal dress. Crop from a group picture.	Aeneas Mackintosh†	Its objective was to lay depots across the Great Ice Barrier, to supply the party crossing from the Weddell Sea. All the required depots were laid, but in the process three men, including the leader Mackintosh, died.	
1921–22	UK	Shackleton–Rowett Expedition	Quest	Man wearing a thick jumper and over it suspenders.	Ernest Shackleton†	Vaguely defined objectives included coastal mapping, a possible continental circumnavigation, the investigation of sub-Antarctic islands, and oceanographic work. After Shackleton's death on 5 January 1922, Quest completed a shortened programme before returning home.	

== Expedition deaths during the Heroic Age ==
Twenty-two men died on Antarctic expeditions during the Heroic Age. Of these, four died of illnesses unrelated to their Antarctic experiences, and two died from accidents in New Zealand, and one in France. The remaining 15 perished during service on or near the Antarctic continent.

Expedition	Name	Country	Date of death	Place of death	Cause	Refs
Belgian Antarctic Expedition	Carl August Wiencke	Norway	22 January 1898	South Shetland Islands	Washed overboard and drowned	
Belgian Antarctic Expedition	Émile Danco	Belgium	5 June 1898	Bellingshausen Sea	Heart disease	
Southern Cross Expedition	Nicolai Hansen	Norway	14 October 1899	Cape Adare, Antarctica	Intestinal disorder	
Discovery Expedition	Charles Bonnor	UK	2 December 1901	Lyttelton Harbour, New Zealand	Fall from ship's mast	
Discovery Expedition	George Vince	UK	11 March 1902	Ross Island, Antarctica	Slip over ice precipice	
First German Antarctic Expedition	Josef Enzensperger	Germany	2 February 1903	Kerguelen Island	Beriberi	
Swedish Antarctic Expedition	Ole Kristian Wennersgaard	Sweden	7 June 1903	Paulet Island	Heart failure	
Scottish National Antarctic Expedition	Allan Ramsey	UK	6 August 1903	South Orkney Islands	Heart disease	
Third French Antarctic Expedition	F. Maignan	France	15 August 1903	Le Havre, France	Struck by broken rope	4]8
Terra Nova Expedition	Edgar Evans	UK	17 February 1912	Beardmore Glacier, Antarctica	Head injury, starvation, and cold	
Terra Nova Expedition	Lawrence Oates	UK	17 March 1912	Great Ice Barrier, Antarctica	Starvation and cold	
Terra Nova Expedition	Robert Falcon Scott	UK	29 March 1912	Great Ice Barrier, Antarctica	Starvation and cold	
Terra Nova Expedition	Edward Wilson	UK	29 March 1912	Great Ice Barrier, Antarctica	Starvation and cold	
Terra Nova Expedition	Henry Bowers	UK	29 March 1912	Great Ice Barrier, Antarctica	Starvation and cold	
Terra Nova Expedition	Robert Brissenden	UK	17 August 1912	Admiralty Bay, New Zealand	Drowning	
Second German Antarctic Expedition	Walter Slossarczyk	Germany	26 November 1911	Mount Duse, South Georgia	Suicide or accident	
Second German Antarctic Expedition	Richard Vahsel	Germany	8 August 1912	Weddell Sea	Syphilis	
Australasian Antarctic Expedition	Belgrave Ninnis	UK	14 December 1912	King George V Land, Antarctica	Fall into crevasse	
Australasian Antarctic Expedition	Xavier Mertz	Switzerland	7 January 1913	King George V Land, Antarctica	Cold and malnutrition (Hypervitaminosis A)	
Imperial Trans-Antarctic Expedition (Ross Sea party)	Arnold Spencer-Smith	UK	9 March 1916	Ross Ice Shelf, Antarctica	Cold and scurvy	
Imperial Trans-Antarctic Expedition (Ross Sea party)	Aeneas Mackintosh	UK	8 May 1916	McMurdo Sound, Antarctica	Fall through sea ice	
Imperial Trans-Antarctic Expedition (Ross Sea party)	Victor Hayward	UK	8 May 1916	McMurdo Sound, Antarctica	Fall through sea ice	
Shackleton–Rowett Expedition	Ernest Shackleton	UK	5 January 1922	South Georgia	Heart disease	

Another five men died shortly after returning from the Antarctic (this does not include the significant number who died on active service in the First World War):

- Engebret Knudsen, a member of the Belgian Antarctic Expedition, 1897–1899, developed signs of mental illness and never fully recovered, died in 1900.
- Herluf Kløvstad, the expeditionary surgeon on the Southern Cross Expedition, 1898–1900, died of unrecorded causes during 1900.
- Jorgen Petersen, first mate on the Southern Cross, died in 1900 while returning on the ship from Australia.
- Bertram Armytage, a member of the Nimrod Expedition, 1907–1909, died of self-inflicted gunshot wounds, 12 March 1910.
- Hjalmar Johansen, a member of Amundsen's 1910–1912 expedition, died of self-inflicted gunshot wounds, 9 January 1913.

== End of the Heroic Age ==
Scholars debate exactly when the Heroic Age of Antarctic Exploration came to an end. Shackleton's Endurance expedition is sometimes referred to as the last Antarctic expedition of the Heroic Age. Other chroniclers extend the era to the date of Shackleton's death, 5 January 1922, treating the Shackleton–Rowett, or Quest expedition, during which Shackleton died, as the final chapter of the Age. According to Margery and James Fisher, Shackleton's biographers: "If it were possible to draw a distinct dividing line between what has been called the Heroic Age of Antarctic Exploration and the Mechanical Age, the Shackleton–Rowett expedition might make as good a point as any at which to draw such a line". A journalist inspecting the ship before she sailed reported "Gadgets! Gadgets! Gadgets everywhere!" These included wireless, an electrically heated crow's nest and an "odograph" that could trace and record the ship's route and speed.

The heroic era of Antarctic exploration was 'heroic' because it was anachronistic before it began, its goal was as abstract as a pole, its central figures were romantic, manly and flawed, its drama was moral (for it mattered not only what was done but how it was done), and its ideal was national honour. It was an early testing-ground for the racial virtues of new nations such as Norway and Australia, and it was the site of Europe's last gasp before it tore itself apart in the Great War.

— Tom Griffiths, Slicing the Silence: Voyaging to Antarctica p. 111

== See also ==
- List of Antarctic exploration ships from the Heroic Age, 1897–1922
- Arctic exploration
- Farthest South
- History of Antarctica
- List of Antarctic expeditions
- List of polar explorers

== Sources ==
=== Books ===
- Alexander, Caroline (1998). The Endurance: Shackleiton's Legendary Antarctic Expedition. London: Bloomsbury Publishing. ISBN 07-4754-123-X.
- Amundsen, Roald (1976). The South Pole, Vol II. London: C Hurst & Co. ISBN 09-0398-347-8.
- Barczewski, Stephanie (2007). Antarctic Destinies. London: Hambledon Continuum. ISBN 978-1-84-725192-3.
- Berton, Pierre (1988). Tha Arctic Grail. New York: Viking Penguin. ISBN 06-7082-491-7.
- Borchgrevink, Carstens (1901). First on the Antarctic Continent. George Newnes Ltd. ISBN 978-0-90-583841-0. Archived from the original on 30 June 2023.
- Crane, David (2005). Scott of the Antarctic: A Life of Courage, and Tragedy in the Extreme South. London: Harper Collins. ISBN 978-0-00-715068-7.
- Elzinga, Aang (1993). Changing Trends in Antarctic Research. Dordrecth: Springer. ISBN 978-0-58-528849-9.
- Fiennes, Ranulph (2003). Captain Scott. London: Hodder & Stoughton. ISBN 03-4082-697-5.
- Fisher, Margery and James (1957). Shackleton. London: James Barrie Books.
- Griffiths, Tom (2007). Slicing the Silence:Voyaging to Antarctica. United States: Harvard University Press. ISBN 978-06-7402-633-9.
- McElrea, Richard; Harrowfield, David (2004). Polar Castaways: The Ross Sea Party of Sir Ernest Shackleton, 1914–1917. Montreal: McGill-Queen's University Press. ISBN 978-0-77-357245-4.
- Headland, Robert K. (1989). Studies in Polar Research: Chronological List of Antarctic Explorations and Related Historical Events. Cambridge: Cambridge University Press. ISBN 978-0-52-130903-5.
- Huntford, Roland (1985). The Last Place on Earth. London: Pan Books. ISBN 03-4911-395-5.
- Huntford, Roland (1985). Shackleton. London: Hodder & Stoughton. ISBN 03-4025-007-0.
- Huxley, Leonard, ed. (1913). Scott's Last Expedition, Vol. II. London: Smith, Elder & Co. ISBN 06-6579-784-2.
- Ivanov, Lyubomir; Ivanova, Nusha. In: The World of Antarctica. Archived 1 November 2022 at the Wayback Machine Generis Publishing, 2022. pp. 84–90. ISBN 979-8-88676-403-1
- Jacka, Fred; Jacka, Eleanor, eds. (1988). Mawson's Antarctic Diaries. London, Sidney and Wellington: Unwin Hyman. ISBN 0-043-20209-8.
- Jones, Max (2003). The Last Great Quest. Oxford: Oxford University Press. ISBN 01-9280-483-9.
- Machat, J. (1908). "The Antarctic Question – Voyages To The South Pole Since 1898". Annual Report of the Board of Regents of the Smithsonian Institution: 451–481.
- Mill, Hugh Robert (1905). Siege of the South Pole. London: Alston Rivers. ASIN B008HLMMO6.
- Mills, Leif (1999). Frank Wild. Whitby, Yorks: Caedmon of Whitby. ISBN 09-0535-548-2.
- Preston, Diana (1997). A First Rate Tragedy. London: Constable & Co. ISBN 00-9479-530-4.
- Riffenburgh, Beau (2006). Encyclopedia of the Antarctic. Routledge. ISBN 978-0-41-597024-2.
- Riffenburgh, Beau (2005). Nimrod. London: Bloomsbury Publishing. ISBN 07-4757-253-4.
- Scott, Robert Falcon (1913). Scott's Last Expedition, Vol I. London: Smith, Elder & Co. ISBN 06-6579-784-2.
- Shackleton, Ernest (1984). South. London: Century Publishing. ISBN 07-1260-111-2.
- Simpson-Hausley, Paul (1992). Antarctica: Exploration, Perception and Metaphor. London: Routledge. ISBN 978-0-20-303602-0.
- Smith, Michael (2014). Shackleton: By Endurance we Conquer. London: Oneworld. ISBN 978-1780-74707-1.
- Speak, Peter (2003). William Speirs Bruce. Edinburgh: NMS Publishing. ISBN 19-0166-371-X.
- Tyler-Lewis, Kelly (2007). The Lost Men. London: Bloomsbury Publishing. ISBN 978-0-74-757972-4.

=== Journal articles ===
- American Association for the Advancement of Science (1887). "The Exploration of the Antarctic Regions". Science. 9 (223).
- Fogg, G.E. (2000). "The Royal Society and the Antarctic". Notes and Records of the Royal Society London. 54 (1): 85–98. doi:10.1098/rsnr.2000.0098.
- Kaye, I. (1969). "Captain James Cook and the Royal Society". Notes and Records of the Royal Society of London. 24 (1): 7–18. doi:10.1098/rsnr.1969.0003.
- Murray, John (1894). "The Renewal of Antarctic Exploration". The Geographical Journal. 3 (1): 1–27. doi:10.2307/1773599. JSTOR 1773599.

=== Web sources ===
- "Antarctic Explorers – Adrien de Gerlache". South-pole.com. 2008. Archived from the original on 5 March 2012.
- "Antarctic History – The Heroic Age of Antarctic Exploration". Cool Antarctica. 2 December 2008. Archived from the original on 4 May 2012.
- "Carsten Borchgrevink (1864–1934)". South-pole.com. Archived from the original on 17 April 2019.
- "British Antarctic Expedition 1910–13". Oxford Dictionary of National Biography. May 2008. Archived from the original on 15 July 2012.
- "Carl Chun Collection". Archive Hub.
- "Erich von Drygalski 1865–1949". South-pole.com. 2008. Archived from the original on 14 April 2012.
- "Explorer and leader: Captain Scott". National Maritime Museum. Archived from the original on 2 December 2008.
- "Wilhem Filchner, 1877–1957". South-pole.com. 2008. Archived from the original on 6 August 2011.
- "The Forgotten Expedition". Antarctic Heritage Trust. 29 November 2008. Archived from the original on 20 November 2009.
- "German National Antarctic Expedition 1901–03". Cool Antarctica. 2 December 2008. Archived from the original on 28 May 2012.
- Goodlad, James A. (2003). "Scotland and the Antarctic, Section 2: Antarctic Exploration". Royal Scottish Geographical Society. Archived from the original on 5 August 2012.
- Harrowfield, David. "The Southern Cross Expedition". University of Canterbury, New Zealand. Archived from the original on 6 April 2017.
- "John Lachlan Cope's Expedition to Graham Land 1920–22". Scott Polar Research Institute. Archived from the original on 6 July 2012.
- "Douglas Mawson". Cool Antarctica. 2 December 2008. Archived from the original on 17 May 2012.
- Diary of Stan Taylor, Seaman on the Aurora 1912–1913 journey Archived 10 August 2013 at the Wayback Machine
- "Mountaineering and Polar Collection – Antarctica". National Library of Scotland. 2007. Archived from the original on 23 June 2009.
- "Norway's Forgotten Explorer". Antarctic Heritage Trust. 29 November 2008. Archived from the original on 20 November 2009.
- "Nobu Shirase, 1861–1946". South-pole.com. 2008. Archived from the original on 27 October 2019.
- "Otto Nordenskiöld 1869–1928". South-pole.com. 2008. Archived from the original on 25 October 2015.
- Ryne, Linn. "Roald Amundsen". Norwegian Embassy (UK). Archived from the original on 22 April 2008.
- "The Voyage of the Challenger". Stony Brook University, N.Y. Archived from the original on 14 May 2012.
- Working-Class 'Hero' after two decades of polar exploration. Archived 30 December 2019 at the Wayback Machine Portland Magazine. November 2012.
