= Carsten Borchgrevink =

Norwegian polar explorer (1864–1934)

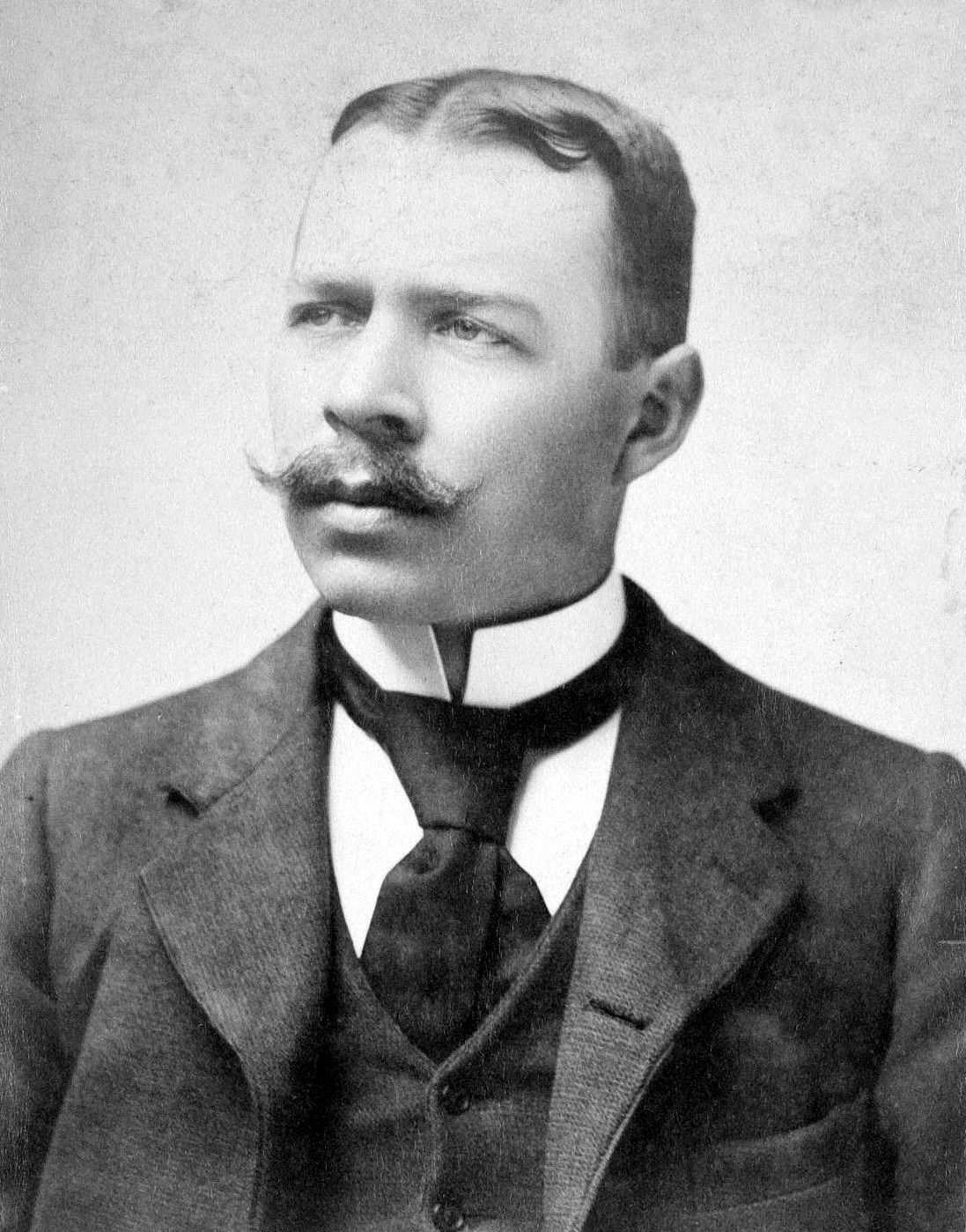
- Born: Carsten Egeberg Borchgrevink; 1 December 1864; Christiania, Norway
- Died: 21 April 1934 (aged 69); Oslo, Norway
- Education: Royal Forestry School
- Occupations: Polar explorer; surveyor
- Known for: Southern Cross expedition
- Awards: Knight of the Royal Norwegian Order of St. Olav (1901); Knight of the Danish Order of the Dannebrog (1906); Knight Commander of the Order of Franz Joseph (1911); Royal Geographical Society's Patron's Medal (1930)

Carsten Egeberg Borchgrevink (1 December 1864 – 21 April 1934) was a Norwegian polar explorer and a pioneer of Antarctic travel. He inspired Sir Robert Falcon Scott, Sir Ernest Shackleton, Roald Amundsen, and others associated with the Heroic Age of Antarctic Exploration.

Borchgrevink was born and raised in Christiania (now Oslo) as the son of a Norwegian lawyer and an English-born immigrant mother. He began his exploring career in 1894 by joining a Norwegian whaling expedition, during which he became one of the first people to set foot on the Antarctic mainland. This achievement helped him to obtain backing for his Southern Cross expedition, which became the first to overwinter on the Antarctic mainland, and the first to visit the Great Ice Barrier since the expedition of Sir James Clark Ross nearly sixty years earlier.

The expedition's successes were received with only moderate interest by the public – and by the British geographical establishment, whose attention was by then focused on Scott's upcoming Discovery expedition. Some of Borchgrevink's colleagues were critical of his leadership, and his own accounts of the expedition were regarded as journalistic and unreliable.

From 1898 to 1900, Borchgrevink led the British-financed Southern Cross expedition. He was one of three scientists in 1902 to report on the aftermath of the Mount Pelée eruption on Martinique. Thereafter he returned to Kristiania, leading a life mainly away from public attention. His pioneering work was subsequently recognised and honoured by several countries, and in 1912 he received a tribute from Roald Amundsen, leader of the first expedition to reach the South Pole.

In 1930, the Royal Geographical Society acknowledged Borchgrevink's contribution to polar exploration and awarded him its Patron's Medal. The Society acknowledged in its citation that justice had not previously been done to the work of the Southern Cross expedition.

== Early life ==
Carsten Borchgrevink was born in Christiania on 1 December 1864, the son of a Norwegian lawyer, Henrik Christian Borchgrevink, and an English-born mother Annie, née Ridley. The Borchgrevink family has distant Dutch roots and immigrated to Denmark in the 16th century and Norway in the late 17th century. The family lived in the Uranienborg neighbourhood, where Roald Amundsen, an occasional childhood playmate, also grew up. Borchgrevink was educated at Gjertsen College, Oslo, and later (1885–1888) at the Royal Saxon Academy of Forestry at Tharandt, Saxony, in Germany.

According to the historian Roland Huntford, Borchgrevink had a restless nature, with a passion for adventure which took him, after his forestry training, to Australia. For four years he worked with government surveying teams in Queensland and New South Wales before settling in the small town of Bowenfels, where he became a teacher in languages and natural sciences at Cooerwull Academy. His initial interest in polar exploration developed from reading press reports about the work of local scientists on the first Australian Antarctic Exploration Committee. This organisation, founded in 1886, was investigating the possibility of establishing permanent scientific research stations in the Antarctic regions. These plans were not realised; it was a revival of interest in commercial whaling in the early 1890s that gave Borchgrevink the opportunity, in 1894, to sign up for a Norwegian expedition to Antarctica.

== Whaling voyage ==
The expedition that Borchgrevink joined was organised by Henryk Bull, a Norwegian businessman and entrepreneur who, like Borchgrevink, had settled in Australia in the late 1880s. Bull planned to make a sealing and whaling voyage into Antarctic waters; after failing to interest Melbourne's learned societies in a cost-sharing venture of a commercial–scientific nature, he returned to Norway to organise his expedition there. He met Svend Foyn, the 84-year-old "father of modern whaling" and inventor of the harpoon gun. With Foyn's help he acquired the whaler Kap Nor ("North Cape"), which he renamed Antarctic. A Mr Sanne was appointed captain initially but was quickly replaced by Leonard Kristensen. The ship sailed left Norway in September 1893. When Borchgrevink learned that Antarctic was due to visit Melbourne in September 1894, he hurried there hoping to find a vacancy. He was fortunate; William Speirs Bruce, later an Antarctic expedition leader in his own right, had intended to join Bull's expedition as a natural scientist but could not reach the ship before it left Norway. This created an opening for Borchgrevink, who met Bull in Melbourne and persuaded him to take him on as a deck-hand and part-time scientist.

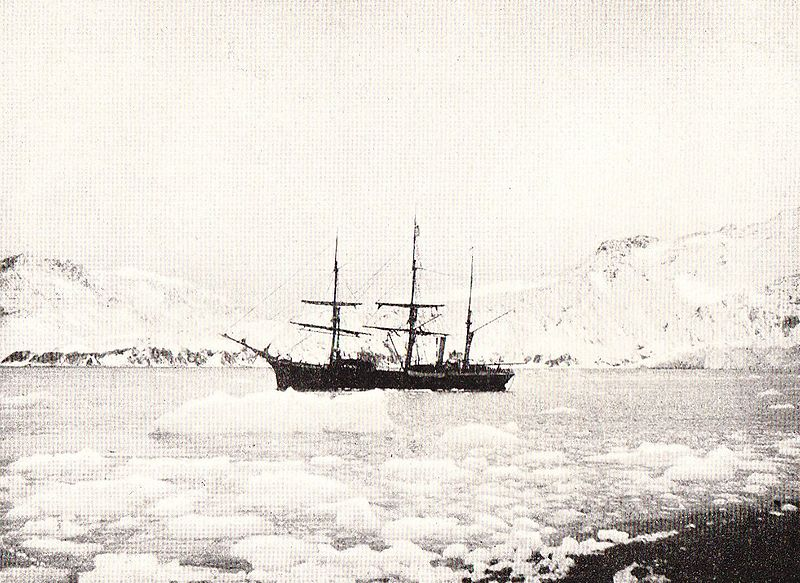
Henryk Bull's ship Antarctic in the pack ice

During the following months, Antarctic's sealing activities around the subantarctic islands were successful, but whales proved difficult to find. Bull and Kristensen decided to take the ship further south, to areas where the presence of whales had been reported by earlier expeditions. The ship penetrated a belt of pack ice and sailed into the Ross Sea, but whales were still elusive. On 17 January 1895, a landing was made at Possession Island, where Sir James Clark Ross had planted the British flag in 1841. Bull and Borchgrevink left a message in a canister to prove their presence there. On the island Borchgrevink found a lichen, the first plant life discovered south of the Antarctic Circle.

On 24 January, the ship reached the vicinity of Cape Adare, at the northern extremity of the Victoria Land coastline of the Antarctic mainland. Ross's 1841 expedition been unable to land here, but as Antarctic neared the cape, conditions were calm enough for a boat to be lowered. A party including Bull, Kristensen, Borchgrevink and others then headed for a shingled foreshore below the cape. Exactly who went ashore first was disputed, between Kristensen, Borchgrevink, and a 17-year-old New Zealand seaman, Alexander von Tunzelmann, who said that he had "leapt out to hold the boat steady". The party claimed this was the first landing on the Antarctic mainland, although they may have been preceded by the Anglo-American sealing captain John Davis, on the Antarctic Peninsula on 7 February 1821, or by other whaling expeditions.

While ashore at Cape Adare, Borchgrevink collected further specimens of rocks and lichens, the latter of which were of great interest to the scientific community, which had doubted the ability of vegetation to survive so far south. He also made a careful study of the foreshore, assessing its potential as a site where a future expedition might land and establish winter quarters. When Antarctic reached Melbourne, Bull and Borchgrevink left the ship. Each hoped to raise funds for a further Antarctic expedition, but their efforts were unsuccessful. An animosity developed between them, possibly because of their differing accounts of the voyage on the Antarctic; each emphasised his own role without fully acknowledging that of the other.

== Making plans ==
=== International Geographical Congress 1895 ===
To promote his developing ideas for an expedition that would overwinter on the Antarctic continent at Cape Adare, Borchgrevink hurried to London, where the Royal Geographical Society was hosting the Sixth International Geographical Congress. On 1 August 1895 he addressed the conference, giving an account of the Cape Adare foreshore as a place where a scientific expedition might establish itself for the Antarctic winter. He described the site as "a safe situation for houses, tents and provisions", and said there were indications that in this place "the unbound forces of the Antarctic Circle do not display the full severity of their powers". He also suggested that the interior of the continent might be accessible from the foreshore by an easy route – a "gentle slope". He ended his speech by declaring his willingness to lead an expedition there himself.

Hugh Robert Mill, the Royal Geographical Society's librarian, who was present at the Congress, reported reactions to the speech: "His blunt manner and abrupt speech stirred the academic discussions with a fresh breeze of realism. Nobody liked Borchgrevink very much at that time, but he had a dynamic quality and a set purpose to get out again to the unknown South that struck some of us as boding well for exploration". The Congress did not, however, endorse Borchgrevink's ideas. Instead, it passed a general resolution in support of Antarctic exploration, to the effect that "the various scientific societies throughout the world should urge, in whatever way seems to them most effective, that this work be undertaken before the close of the century".

=== Seeking support ===
Sir Clements Markham, the Royal Geographical Society president who opposed Borchgrevink's Antarctic plans

For the next two years Borchgrevink travelled in Europe and in Australia, seeking support and backing for his expedition ideas without success. One of those with whom he sought to join forces was William Speirs Bruce, who was planning his own Antarctic expedition. Their joint plans foundered when Borchgrevink, who had severed relations with Henryk Bull, learned that Bruce was in discussions with him; "I regret therefore that we cannot collaborate," wrote Borchgrevink to Bruce.

Under the influence of its president, Sir Clements Markham, the RGS envisaged its own Antarctic expedition not only as a scientific endeavour, but as an attempt to relive the former glories of Royal Naval polar exploration. This vision eventually developed into the National Antarctic Expedition with the Discovery, under Robert Falcon Scott, and it was this that attracted the interest of the learned societies rather than Borchgrevink's more modest proposals. Markham was fiercely opposed to private ventures that might divert financial support from his project, and Borchgrevink found himself starved of practical help: "It was up a steep hill," he wrote, "that I had to roll my Antarctic boulder."

=== Sir George Newnes ===
During his search for backers, Borchgrevink met Sir George Newnes, a leading British magazine publisher and cinema pioneer whose portfolio included the Westminster Gazette, Tit-Bits, Country Life and the Strand Magazine. It was not unusual for publishers to support exploration – Newnes's great rival Alfred Harmsworth (later Lord Northcliffe) had recently financed Frederick Jackson's expedition to Franz Josef Land, and had pledged financial backing to the National Antarctic Expedition. Newnes was sufficiently impressed by Borchgrevink to offer the full costs of his proposed expedition – around £40,000 (at least £3 million in 2008 values). This generosity infuriated Sir Clements Markham and the geographical establishment, who saw Borchgrevink as a penniless Norwegian nobody who had secured British money which they believed ought to have been theirs. Markham maintained an attitude of hostility and contempt towards Borchgrevink, and chastised Mill for attending the launch of his expedition.

Newnes stipulated that the expedition should sail under a British flag, and should be styled the "British Antarctic Expedition". In the end, of the total party of 29, only two were British, with one Australian and the rest Norwegian. Despite this, Borchgrevink took steps to emphasise the expedition's British character, flying the personal flag of the Duke of York and taking 500 bamboo poles with miniature Union Jacks for, as he put it, "purpose of survey and extension of the British Empire".

== Southern Cross Expedition ==
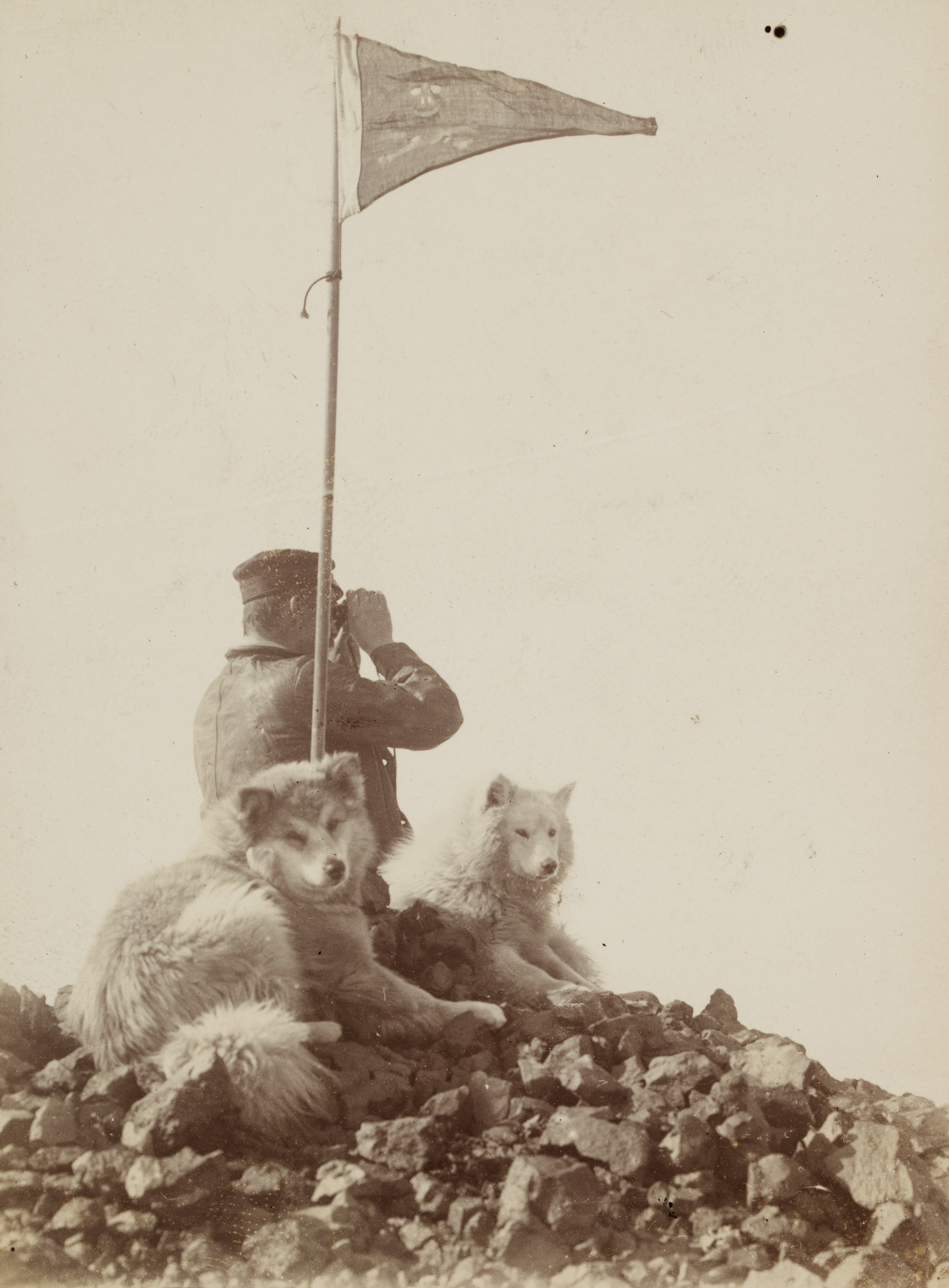
Expedition member with binoculars, Antarctica, 1899

=== Winter in Antarctica ===
With funding assured, Borchgrevink purchased the whaling ship Pollux, renamed her Southern Cross, and had her fitted out for Antarctic service. Southern Cross sailed from London on 22 August 1898, and after a three-week pause in Hobart, Tasmania, reached Cape Adare on 17 February 1899. Here, on the site which Borchgrevink had described to the Congress, the expedition set up the first shore base on the Antarctic continent, in the midst of a penguin colony. It was named "Camp Ridley" in honour of Borchgrevink's mother.

In 1901, Borchgrevink published the book First on the Antarctic Continent. He wrote in a chapter dedicated to Adélie penguins: "We all watched the life of the penguins with the utmost interest, and I believe and hope that some of us learnt something from their habits and characteristics." On 2 March, the ship departed for New Zealand to winter there, leaving a shore party of ten men with their provisions, equipment and seventy dogs. These were the first dogs brought to the Antarctic; likewise, the expedition pioneered the use of the Primus stove, invented in Sweden six years earlier.

Louis Bernacchi, the party's Australian physicist, was later to write: "In many respects, Borchgrevink was not a good leader". Borchgrevink was evidently no autocrat but, Bernacchi said, without the framework of an accepted hierarchy a state of "democratic anarchy" prevailed, with "dirt, disorder and inactivity the order of the day". Furthermore, as winter developed, Borchgrevink's hopes that Cape Adare would escape the worst Antarctic weather proved false; he had chosen a site which was particularly exposed to the freezing winds blown northwards from the inland ice. As time progressed, tempers wore thin; the party became irritable and boredom set in.

On January 23rd, the anniversary of my first landing on the Antarctic continent in 1894, I found that the season in regard to climate and ice conditions was not as favorable as in that year [...] It was insufferable inside now, as the smell of the guano deposits was very strong. The wet loose snow which settles in drifts during the recent long gale melted rapidly, and the vapour there-from made the air muggy inside the huts. Besides, our humour always fell with the barometer, and did not always rise as quickly, especially now that, while waiting for the vessel, the time hung heavily on our hands, although there were so many matters to be considered and talked over.

There were accidents: a candle left burning caused extensive fire damage, and on another occasion several members of the party were almost asphyxiated by fumes from the stove. Borchgrevink attempted to establish a routine, and scientific work was carried on throughout, but as he wrote himself, referring to the general lack of fellowship: "The silence roars in one's ears". Further lowering the group's spirits, their Norwegian zoologist, Nicolai Hanson, fell ill, failed to respond to treatment, and died on 14 October 1899.

When the southern winter ended and sledging activity became possible, Borchgrevink's assumptions about an easy route to the interior were shattered; the glaciated mountain ranges adjoining Cape Adare precluded any travel inland, restricting exploration to the immediate area around the cape. Borchgrevink's basic expedition plan – to overwinter on the Antarctic continent and carry out scientific observations there – had been achieved. When Southern Cross returned at the end of January 1900, Borchgrevink decided to abandon the camp, although there were sufficient fuel and provisions left to last another year.

Instead of returning home directly, Southern Cross sailed south until it reached the Great Ice Barrier, discovered by Sir James Clark Ross during his 1839–1843 voyage and later renamed the Ross Ice Shelf in his honour. No one had visited the Barrier since, and Ross had been unable to land. Borchgrevink discovered an inlet in the Barrier edge; this was later named the "Bay of Whales" by Shackleton. Here, on 16 February 1900, Borchgrevink, William Colbeck and the Sami dog-handler, Per Savio, made the first landing on the Barrier and, with dogs and sledges, travelled 10 miles (16 km) south to set a new Farthest South record at 78° 50′. Southern Cross visited other Ross Sea islands before turning for home, reaching New Zealand on 1 April 1900. Borchgrevink then took a steamer to England, arriving early in June.

=== Return and reception ===
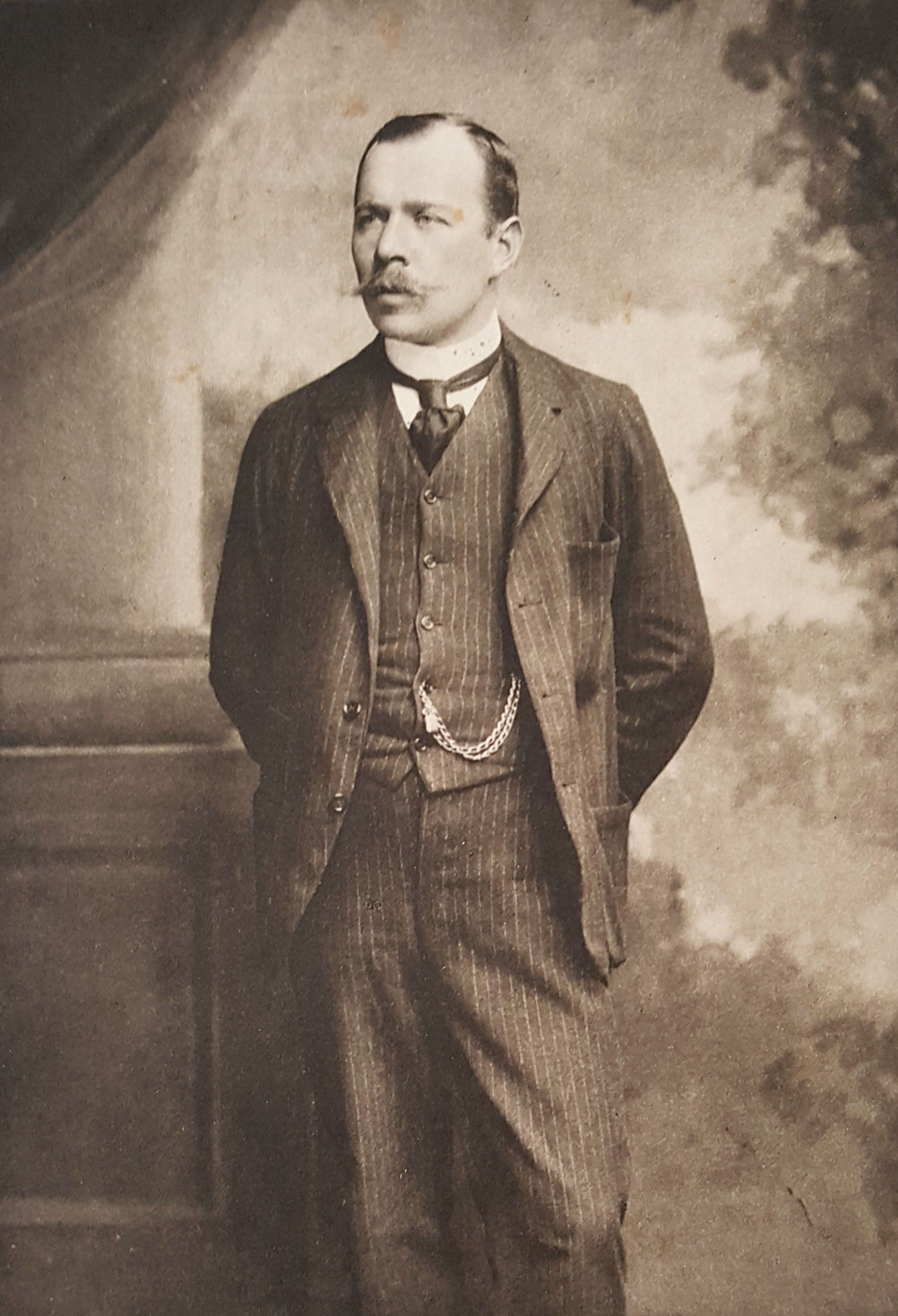
Borchgrevink around 1901

The reception afforded to the expedition on its return to England was lukewarm. Public interest and attention was fixed on the forthcoming national expedition of which Robert Falcon Scott had just been appointed commander, rather than on a venture which was considered British only in name.

In spite of the Southern Cross expedition's achievements, there was still resentment in geographical circles – harboured especially by Sir Clements Markham – about Borchgrevink's acceptance of Newnes's gift. Also, Bruce complained that Borchgrevink had appropriated plans that he had developed but been forced to abandon. Borchgrevink's credibility was not helped by the boastful tone sounded in various articles which were published in Newnes's magazines, nor by the journalistic style of his rapidly written expedition account, First on the Antarctic Continent, the English edition of which appeared in 1901.

In hailing his expedition as a great success, Borchgrevink spoke of "another Klondyke", an abundance of fish, seals and birds, and of "quartz, in which metals are to be seen". In his book, he listed the expedition's main achievements: proof that an expedition could live on Victoria Land over winter; a year's continuous magnetic and meteorological observations; an estimate of the current position of the south magnetic pole; discoveries of new species of insects and shallow-water fauna; coastal mapping and the discovery of new islands; the first landing on Ross Island and, finally, scaling the Great Ice Barrier and sledging to "the furthest south ever reached by man".

Other commentators have observed that the choice of the winter site at Cape Adare had ruled out any serious geographical exploration of the Antarctic interior. The scientific results of the expedition were less than had been anticipated, due in part to the loss of some of Nicolai Hanson's natural history notes; Borchgrevink may have been responsible for this loss; He was later involved in a dispute with Hanson's former employers, Natural History Museum, London, over these missing notes and other specimens collected by Hanson.

Following his return Borchgrevink was honoured by the American Geographical Society, and was made a Knight of the Royal Norwegian Order of St. Olav by King Oscar II. He received honours from Denmark and Austria, but in England his work was for many years largely disregarded, despite Mill's acknowledgement of "a dashing piece of pioneer work, useful in training men for later service". The historian David Crane suggests that if Borchgrevink had been a British naval officer, England would have taken his achievements more seriously.

== Post-expedition life ==
=== Mount Pelée disaster ===
In 1902, Borchgrevink was one of three geographers invited by the National Geographic Society (NGS) to report on the after-effects of the catastrophic eruptions of Mount Pelée, on the French-Caribbean island of Martinique. These eruptions, in May 1902, had destroyed the town of Saint-Pierre, with enormous loss of life. Borchgrevink visited the island in June, when the main volcanic activity had subsided, and found the mountain "perfectly quiet", and the islanders recovered from their panic. He did not think that Saint-Pierre would ever be inhabited again. He reported a narrow escape when, at the foot of the mountain, a jet of steam came out of the ground over which he and his party had just passed: "If it had struck any one of us we would have been scalded to death." He later presented his report to the NGS in Washington, although it is unclear if he did that. His account of the Mt Pelee eruption published in Frank Leslie's Monthly drew sharp criticism in the Science journal from expert Edmund Otis Hovey.

=== Retirement ===
On his return from Washington, Borchgrevink retired into private life. On 7 September 1896, he had married an English woman, Constance Prior Standen, with whom he settled in Slemdal, in Oslo, where two sons and two daughters were born. Borchgrevink devoted himself mainly to sporting and literary activities, producing a book entitled The Game of Norway. On two occasions he apparently considered returning to the Antarctic; in August 1902 he stated his intention to lead a new Antarctic expedition for the NGS, but nothing came of this, and a later venture, announced in Berlin in 1909, was likewise unfulfilled.

Although he remained out of the limelight, Borchgrevink retained his interest in Antarctic matters, visiting Scott shortly before the Terra Nova sailed on Scott's last expedition in June 1910. When news of Scott's death reached the outside world, Borchgrevink paid tribute: "He was the first in the field with a finely organised expedition and the first who did systematic work on the great south polar continent." In a letter of condolence to John Scott Keltie, the Royal Geographical Society's secretary, Borchgrevink said of Scott: "He was a man!"

In Norway differing assessments of Borchgrevink were made by the country's polar elite: Roald Amundsen was a long-time friend and supporter, whereas Fridtjof Nansen, according to Scott, spoke of him as a "tremendous fraud". When Amundsen returned from his South Pole conquest in 1912, he paid full tribute to Borchgrevink's pioneering work: "We must acknowledge that in ascending the Barrier, Borchgrevink opened the way to the south and threw aside the greatest obstacle to the expeditions that followed."

During his later years Borchgrevink lived quietly. In 1929 the Parliament of Norway awarded him a pension of three thousand Norwegian kroner. In 1930 came belated recognition from London – the Royal Geographical Society awarded him its Patron's Medal, proclaiming that the magnitude of the difficulties overcome by Borchgrevink had initially been underestimated: "It was only after the work of Scott's Northern Party ... that we were able to realise the improbability that any explorer could do more in the Cape Adare district than Mr Borchgrevink had accomplished. It appeared, then, that justice had not been done at the time to the pioneer work of the Southern Cross expedition, which had been carried out under the British flag and at the expense of a British benefactor."

== Death and commemoration ==
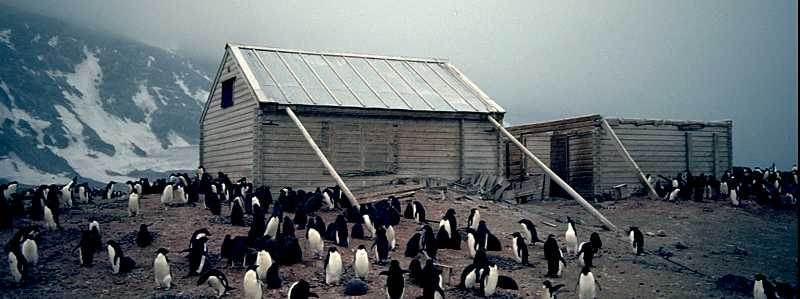
A 1992 photograph of the Southern Cross expedition huts at Cape Adare. The accommodation hut is on the left.

Carsten Borchgrevink died in Oslo on 21 April 1934. Despite what one biographer describes as his obsessive desire to be first, and his limited formal scientific training, he has been acknowledged as a pioneer in Antarctic work and as a forerunner of later, more elaborate expeditions. Several geographical features in Antarctica commemorate his name, including the Borchgrevink Coast of Victoria Land, between Cape Adare and Cape Washington, the Borchgrevink Glacier in Victoria Land, and the Borchgrevinkisen glacier in Queen Maud Land. His name is also carried by the small Antarctic fish Pagothenia borchgrevinki and by the extinct arthropod Borchgrevinkium taimyrensis. His expedition's accommodation hut remains at Cape Adare, under the care of The New Zealand Antarctic Heritage Trust which acts as guardian to this hut and to those of Scott and Shackleton elsewhere on the continent. The Borchgrevink hut was designated by the Trust as Antarctic Specially Protected Area (ASPA) No. 159 in 2002. In June 2005 the Trust adopted a management plan for its future maintenance and accessibility.

== Sources ==
- Amundsen, Roald (1976). The South Pole: Vol. I. London: C. Hurst & Co. ISBN 0-903983-47-8.
- "An Antarctic Timeline". South-pole.com.
- "An Explorer's Experiences" (PDF). The New York Times. 4 June 1902. PDF format
- "Australian Antarctic Division". Australian Government: Department of the Environment. Archived from the original on 31 May 2012.
- Borchgrevink, Carsten (1901). First on the Antarctic Continent. George Newnes Ltd. ISBN 978-0-905838-41-0.
- Borchgrevink, Carsten (July 1902). "History's Greatest Disaster". Frank Leslie's Popular Monthly. 54 (3, Martinique Supplement): 3–16.
- Burton, Robert (2006). Norwegian (Tonsberg) Whaling Expedition 1893–95 in Encyclopedia of the Antarctic, ed. Beau Riffenburgh. Routledge. ISBN 0-415-97024-5.
- "Carsten Borchgrevink (1864–1934)". South-pole.com.
- Coleman, E.C. (2007). The Royal Navy and Polar Exploration, Vol II from Franklin to Scott. Stroud, Gloucestershire: Tempus Publishing. ISBN 978-0-7524-4207-5.
- Crane, David (2005). Scott of the Antarctic. London: HarperCollins. ISBN 0-00-715068-7.
- Fellows, Rev. Samuel (Introduction) (1906). "Complete Story of the San Francisco Horror, by the Survivors and Rescuers". New York: Herbert D Russell. Archived from the original on 24 July 2008.
- Fiennes, Ranulph (2003). Captain Scott. London: Hodder & Stoughton. ISBN 0-340-82697-5.
- "First Landing on the Antarctic Mainland". Antarctic Heritage Trust. Archived from the original on 28 August 2008.
- "Forgotten Expedition, The". Antarctic Heritage Trust. Archived from the original on 20 November 2009.
- Harrowfield, David. "The Southern Cross Expedition". University of Canterbury. Archived from the original on 13 May 2010.
- Huntford, Roland (1983). The Last Place on Earth. London: Pan Books. ISBN 0-330-28816-4.
- Huntford, Roland (1985). Shackleton. London: Hodder & Stoughton. ISBN 0-340-25007-0.
- Huxley, Elspeth (1977). Scott of the Antarctic. London: Weidenfeld and Nicolson. ISBN 0-297-77433-6.
- Jenks, John. "Review of Jackson, Kate: George Newnes and the New Journalism in Britain, 1880–1910 (Ashgate Publishing, Aldershot, 2001)". JHistory.
- Jones, Max (2003). The Last Great Quest. Oxford: Oxford University Press. ISBN 0-19-280483-9.
- "Measuringworth". The Institute for the Measurement of Worth.
- McConville, Andrew (April 2007). "Henrik Bull, the Antarctic Exploration Committee and the first confirmed landing on the Antarctic continent". Polar Record. 43 (2). Cambridge University Press: 143–152. Bibcode:2007PoRec..43..143M. doi:10.1017/S0032247407006109. S2CID 129255252.
- McConville, Andrew (2022). In Search of the Last Continent: Australia and Early Antarctic Exploration. Melbourne: Australian Scholarly Publishing. ISBN 9781922669940.
- Mill, Hugh Robert (1905). The Siege of the South Pole. London: Alston Rivers.
- Mills, William James (2003). Exploring Polar Frontiers. Santa Barbara: ABC-CLIO. ISBN 978-1-57607-422-0.
- "Mt Pelée Eruption (1902)". San Diego State University. Archived from the original on 12 May 2019.
- "Norway's Forgotten Explorer". Antarctic Heritage Trust. Archived from the original on 20 November 2009.
- Preston, Diana (1997). A First Rate Tragedy. London: Constable & Co. ISBN 0-09-479530-4.
- Rubin, Jeff (2008). Antarctica. London: Lonely Planet. ISBN 978-1-74059-094-5.
- "Southern Cross Expedition Members". Antarctic Heritage Trust. Archived from the original on 24 June 2012.
- Speak, Peter (2003). William Speirs Bruce: Polar Explorer and Scottish Nationalist. Edinburgh: National Museums of Scotland. ISBN 1-901663-71-X.
- "Structural Effects of Pyroclastic Flow". University of Virginia. Archived from the original on 19 June 2010.
- Swan, R.A. Borchgrevink, Carsten Egeberg (1864–1934). Australian Dictionary of Biography.
- "Untitled news report". The New York Times. 12 February 1913.
