= Nicolai Hanson =

Norwegian zoologist and Antarctic explorer (1870–1899)

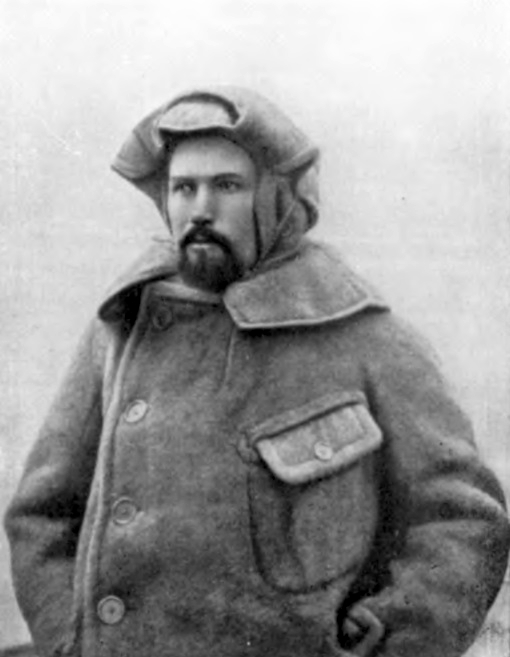
Nicolai Hanson

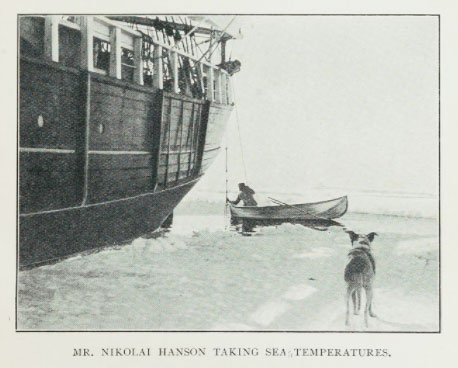
Nicolai Hanson taking sea surface temperature measurements, near the SS Southern Cross, around 1899, near Antarctica

Nicolai Hanson (24 August 1870 – 14 October 1899) was a Norwegian zoologist and Antarctic explorer. Nicolai Hanson was a member of the Southern Cross Expedition led by Carsten Borchgrevink to Antarctica and he became the first person to be buried in Antarctica.

== Biography ==
Nicolai Hanson was born in Kristiansund in Møre og Romsdal county, Norway. Nicolai Hanson was a graduate of the University of Christiana (now University of Oslo) where he studied zoology under Professor Robert Collett.

Hanson was a member of the 1899 Southern Cross Expedition to Antarctica which was the first scientific foray to spend considerable time in the Antarctic and to study the region's unique marine life. Hanson had been seriously ill during the voyage from England. After having arrived at the expedition's winter camp at Cape Adare, he was healthy enough to carry out parts of the planned scientific activities. Hanson died on 14 October 1899, apparently of an intestinal disorder, and became the first person to be buried on the Antarctic continent.

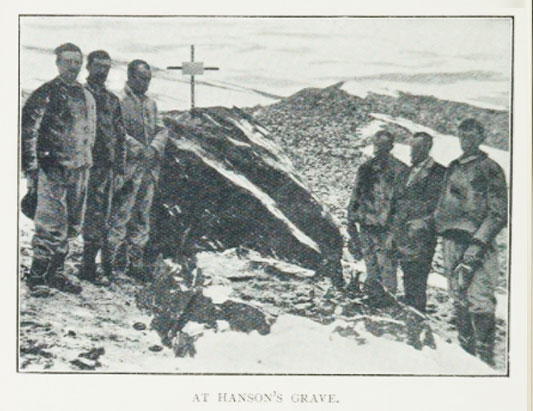
Crew of the Southern Cross Expedition at Nicolai Hanson's grave.

At his request, Hanson was buried in the mountain section above Cape Adare, where a grave was excavated from the mountain. The grave is marked with white quartz stones and a wooden cross and plaque that is attached to a large stone. It is listed on the Antarctic Treaty's list of historic sites and monuments in Antarctica. More recent visitors to Antarctica have reconstructed the Norwegians' desolate and snow-damaged hut that represented the first permanent construction in the southern continent. This empty base camp also stands as a memorial to Nicolai Hanson.

Hanson had married shortly before he traveled to Antarctica. He left a wife and a baby daughter, Johanne Hanson Vogt (1898–1999) who was born after he left on the expedition. The Antarctic Nototheniidae fish Trematomus nicolai is named after Nicolai Hanson. Mount Hanson, a small peak south of Cape Adare, was also named in his honor.

== See also ==
- Hansen Nunatak
