= Duke of York Island (Antarctica) =

Island of Antarctica

Coordinates: 71°38′S 170°04′E

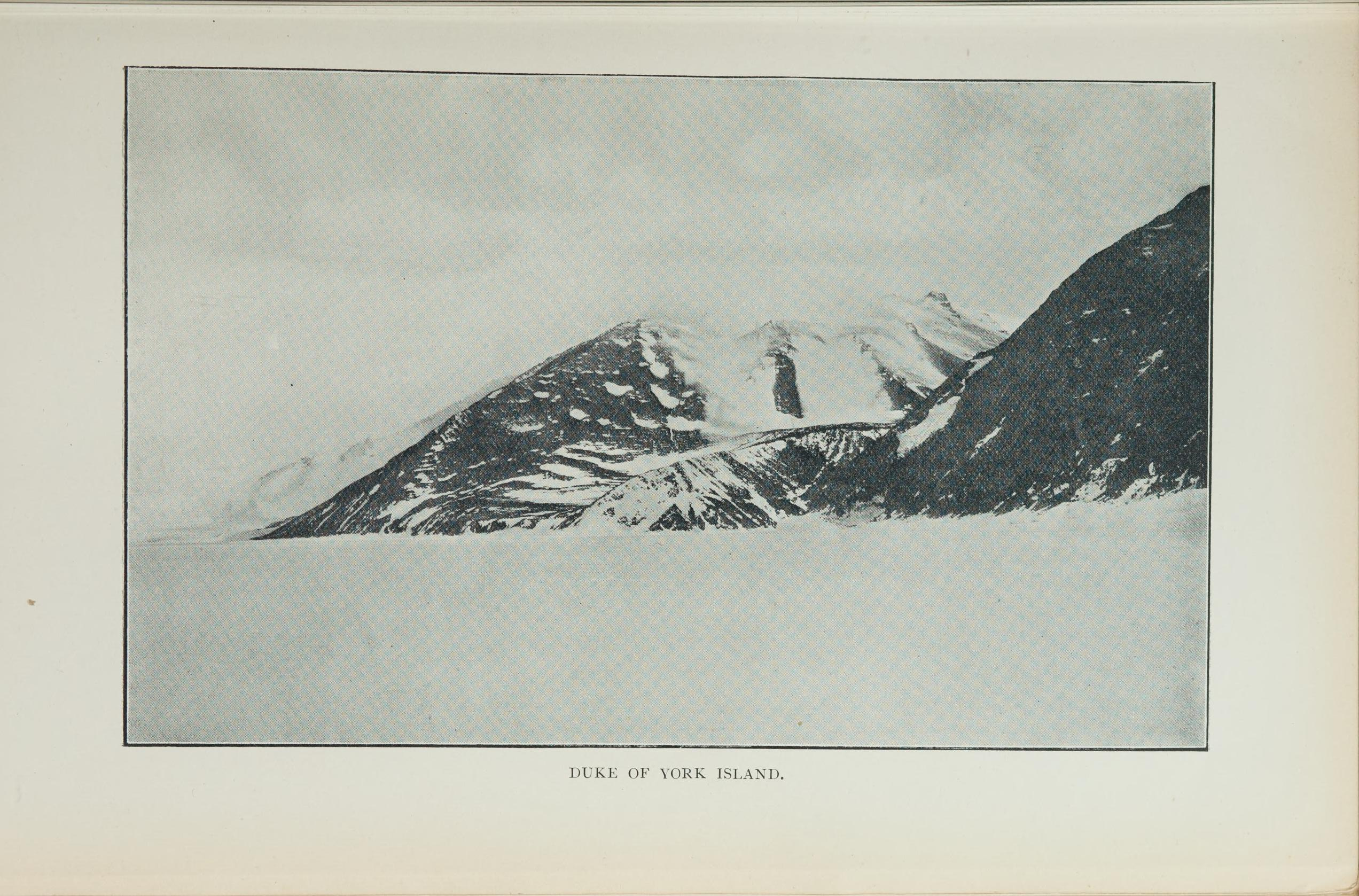

- Map showing Duke of York Island in Antarctica
- Etymology: Named by Carsten Borchgrevink for George V

Geography
- Location: Robertson Bay, Pennell Coast, Victoria Land, Antarctica
- Length: 2.5 mi (4 km)

Duke of York Island is a mountainous ice-free island, 2.5 miles (4 km) long, lying in the southern part of Robertson Bay, Antarctica, along the northern coast of Victoria Land. It was first charted in 1899 by the British Antarctic Expedition, under Carsten Borchgrevink, who named it for the then Duke of York, later George V. This island lies situated within the borders known as the Pennell Coast, a portion of Antarctica lying between Cape Williams and Cape Adare.

== Important Bird Area ==
A 680 ha site comprising the whole island has been designated an Important Bird Area (IBA) by BirdLife International because it supports a breeding colony of Adélie penguins, with an estimate of some 16,000 breeding pairs based on 2011 satellite imagery. Snow petrels are also reported to breed on the island.

== See also ==
- List of Antarctic and subantarctic islands
