= Antarctic whales =

Antarctic whales are any whales which are known to reside near Antarctica for at least part of the year. This includes:

- Arnoux's beaked whale
- Blue whale
- Dwarf sperm whale
- Fin whale
- Gray's beaked whale
- Humpback whale
- Minke whale
- Antarctic minke whale
- Pygmy right whale
- Pygmy sperm whale
- Sei whale
- Southern bottlenose whale
- Southern right whale
- Sperm whale
- Strap-toothed whale
