= Southern Cross Expedition =

1898–1900 research expedition to Antarctica

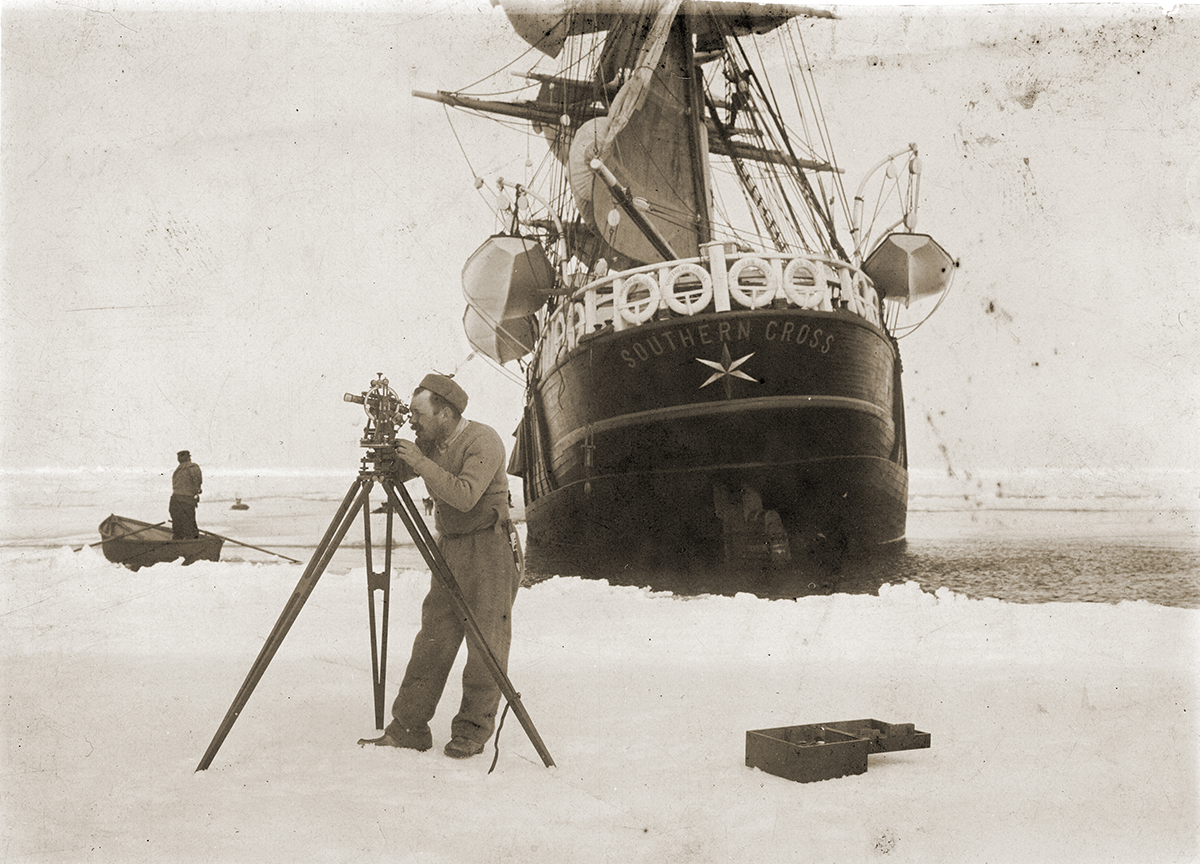
Expedition commander Carsten Borchgrevink taking a theodolite reading in front of the Southern Cross, 1899

The Southern Cross Expedition, otherwise known as the British Antarctic Expedition, 1898–1900, was the first British venture of the Heroic Age of Antarctic Exploration, and the forerunner of the more celebrated journeys of Robert Falcon Scott and Ernest Shackleton. The brainchild of the Norwegian explorer Carsten Borchgrevink, it was the first expedition to over-winter on the Antarctic mainland, the first to visit the Great Ice Barrier—later known as the Ross Ice Shelf—since Sir James Clark Ross's groundbreaking expedition of 1839 to 1843, and the first to effect a landing on the Barrier's surface. It also pioneered the use of dogs and sledges in Antarctic travel.

The expedition was privately financed by the British magazine publisher Sir George Newnes. Borchgrevink's party sailed in the Southern Cross, and spent the southern winter of 1899 at Cape Adare, the northwest extremity of the Ross Sea coastline. Here they carried out an extensive programme of scientific observations, although opportunities for inland exploration were restricted by the mountainous and glaciated terrain surrounding the base. In January 1900, the party left Cape Adare in Southern Cross to explore the Ross Sea, following the route taken by Ross 60 years earlier. They reached the Great Ice Barrier, where a team of three made the first sledge journey on the Barrier surface, during which a new Farthest South record latitude was established at 78° 50′S.

On its return to Britain the expedition was coolly received by London's geographical establishment exemplified by the Royal Geographical Society, which resented the pre-emption of the pioneering Antarctic role they envisaged for the Discovery Expedition. There were also questions about Borchgrevink's leadership qualities, and criticism of the limited extent of scientific results. Thus, despite the number of significant "firsts", Borchgrevink was never accorded the heroic status of Scott or Shackleton, and his expedition was soon forgotten in the dramas which surrounded these and other Heroic Age explorers. However, Roald Amundsen, conqueror of the South Pole in 1911, acknowledged that Borchgrevink's expedition had removed the greatest obstacles to Antarctic travel, and had opened the way for all the expeditions that followed.

== Background ==
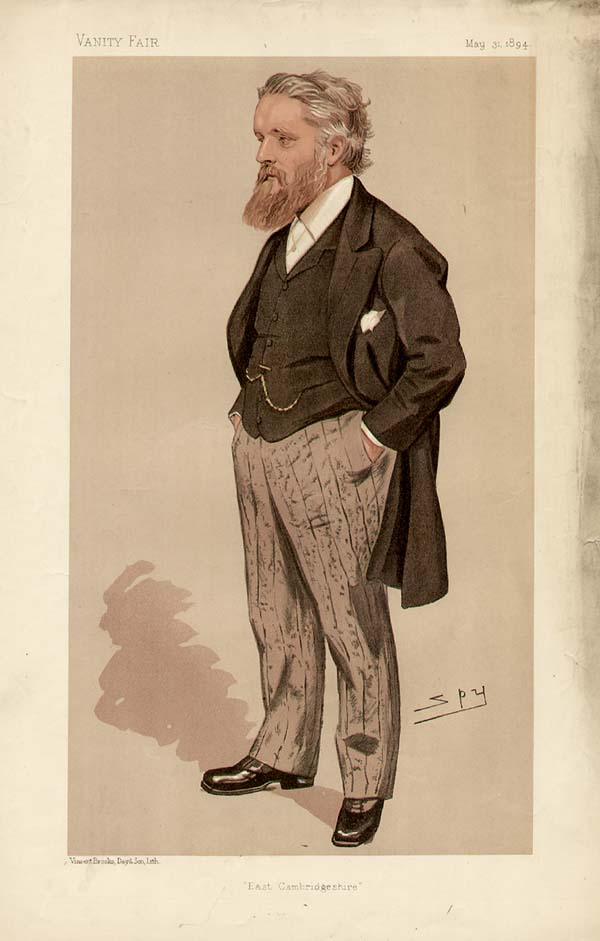
A cartoon depiction of Sir George Newnes

Born in Oslo in 1864 to a Norwegian father and an English mother, Carsten Borchgrevink emigrated to Australia in 1888, where he worked as a land surveyor in the interior before accepting a provincial schoolteaching appointment in New South Wales. Having a taste for adventure, in 1894 he joined a commercial whaling expedition, led by Henryk Bull, which penetrated Antarctic waters and reached Cape Adare, the western portal to the Ross Sea. A party including Bull and Borchgrevink briefly landed there, and claimed to be the first men to set foot on the Antarctic continent—although the English-born American sealer John Davis believed he had landed on the Antarctic Peninsula in 1821. Bull's party also visited Possession Island in the Ross Sea, leaving a message in a tin box as proof of their journey. Borchgrevink was convinced that the Cape Adare location, with its huge penguin rookery providing a ready supply of fresh food and blubber, could serve as a base at which a future expedition could overwinter and subsequently explore the Antarctic interior.

After his return from Cape Adare, Borchgrevink spent much of the following years in Britain and Australia, seeking financial backing for an Antarctic expedition. Despite a well-received address to the 1895 Sixth International Geographical Congress in London, in which he professed his willingness to lead such a venture, he was initially unsuccessful. The Royal Geographical Society (RGS) was preparing its own plans for a large-scale National Antarctic Expedition (which eventually became the Discovery Expedition 1901–04) and was in search of funds; Borchgrevink was regarded by RGS president Sir Clements Markham as a foreign interloper and a rival for funding. Borchgrevink persuaded the publisher Sir George Newnes (whose business rival Alfred Harmsworth was backing the RGS venture) to meet the full cost of his expedition, some £40,000. This gift infuriated Markham and the RGS, since Newnes's donation, had it come their way would, he said have been enough "to get the National Expedition on its legs".

Newnes stipulated that Borchgrevink's expedition should sail under the British flag, and be styled the "British Antarctic Expedition". Borchgrevink readily agreed to these conditions, even though only two of the entire expedition party were British. This annoyed Markham all the more, and he subsequently rebuked the RGS librarian Hugh Robert Mill for attending the Southern Cross Expedition launch. Mill had toasted the success of the expedition, calling it "a reproach to human enterprise" that there were parts of the earth that man had never attempted to reach. He hoped that this reproach would be lifted through "the munificence of Sir George Newnes and the courage of Mr Borchgrevink".

== Organisation ==
=== Expedition objectives ===
Borchgrevink's original expedition objectives included the development of commercial opportunities, as well as scientific and geographical discovery. However, his plans to exploit the extensive guano deposits that he had observed during his 1894–95 voyage were not pursued. Research would be carried out across a range of disciplines, and Borchgrevink hoped that the scientific results would be complemented by spectacular geographical discoveries and journeys, even perhaps an attempt on the geographical South Pole itself; he was unaware at this stage that the site of the base at Cape Adare would not allow access to the hinterland of Antarctica.

=== Ship ===
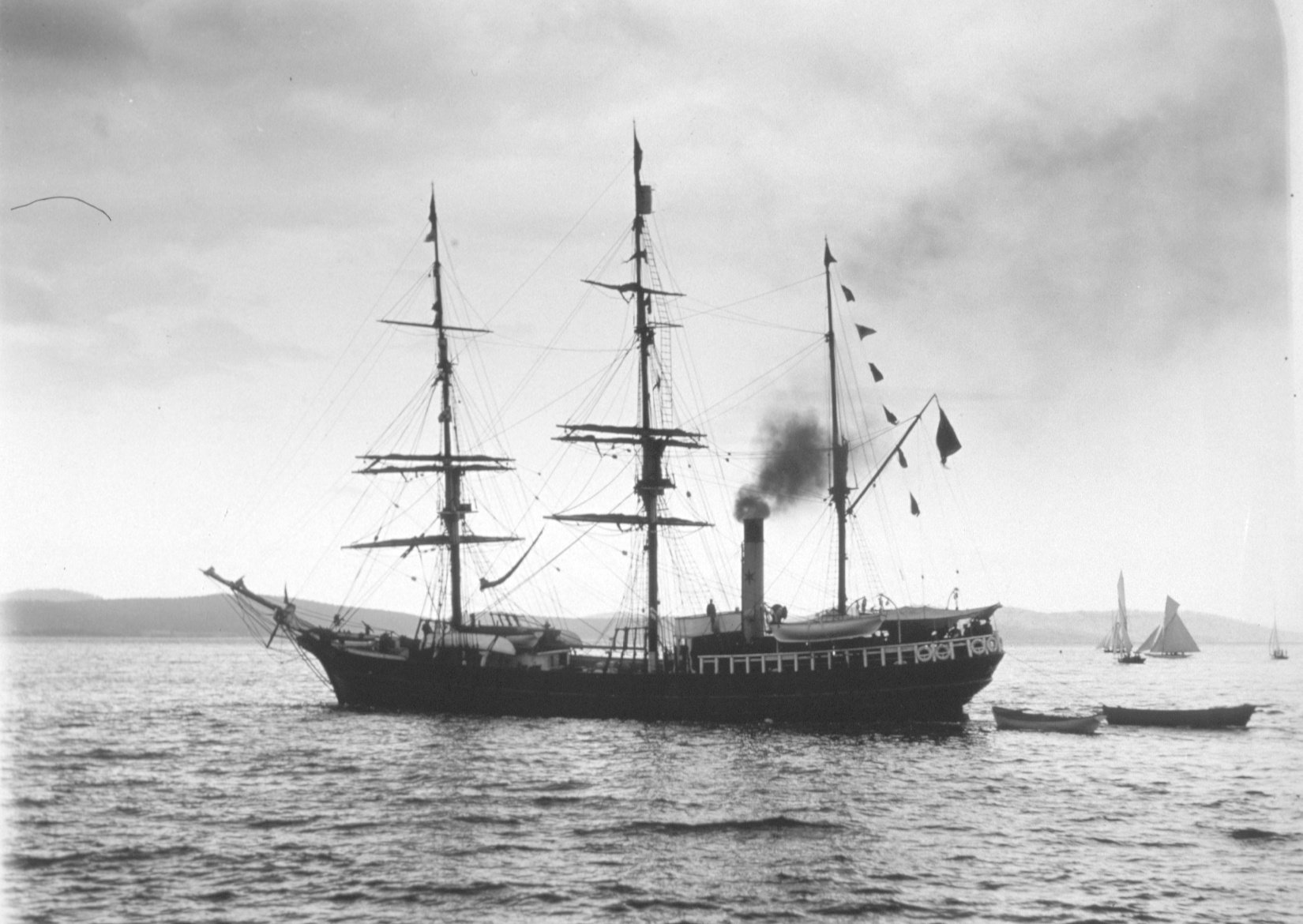
SS Southern Cross

For his expedition's ship, Borchgrevink purchased in 1897 a steam whaler, Pollux, that had been built in 1886 in Arendal on the south east coast of Norway, to the design of renowned shipbuilder Colin Archer. Archer had designed and built Fridtjof Nansen's ship, Fram, which in 1896 had returned unscathed from its long drift in the northern polar ocean during Nansen's Fram expedition. Pollux, which Borchgrevink renamed Southern Cross, was barque-rigged, 520 gross register tons, and 146 feet (45 m) overall length.

The ship was taken to Archer's yard in Larvik to be fitted out with engines designed to Borchgrevink's specification. Although Markham continued to question the ship's seaworthiness, she was able to fulfil all that was required of her in Antarctic waters. Like several of the historic polar ships her post-expedition life was relatively short. She was sold to the Newfoundland Sealing Company, and in April 1914, was lost with her entire complement of 173, in the 1914 Newfoundland sealing disaster.

=== Personnel ===
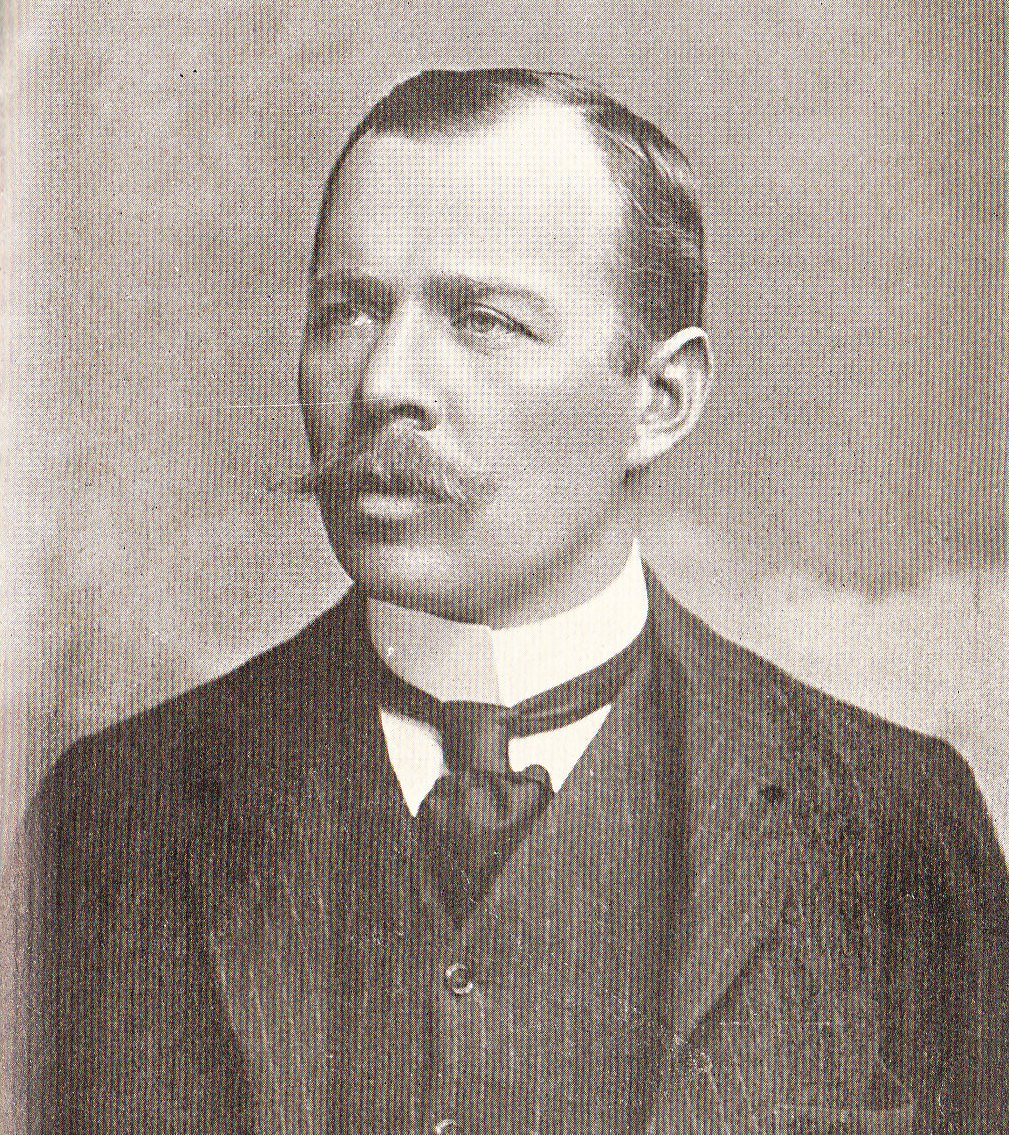
Carsten Borchgrevink, expedition leader

The ten-man shore party who were to winter at Cape Adare consisted of Borchgrevink, five scientists, a medical officer, a cook who also served as a general assistant, and two dog drivers. Five—including Borchgrevink—were Norwegian, two were English, one Australian and the two dog experts from northern Norway, sometimes described in expedition accounts as Lapps or "Finns".

Among the scientists was the Tasmanian Louis Bernacchi, who had studied magnetism and meteorology at the Melbourne Observatory. He had been appointed to the Belgian Antarctic Expedition of 1897–1899, but had been unable to take up his post when the expedition's ship, the Belgica, had failed to call at Melbourne on its way south. Bernacchi then travelled to London and secured a place on Borchgrevink's scientific staff.

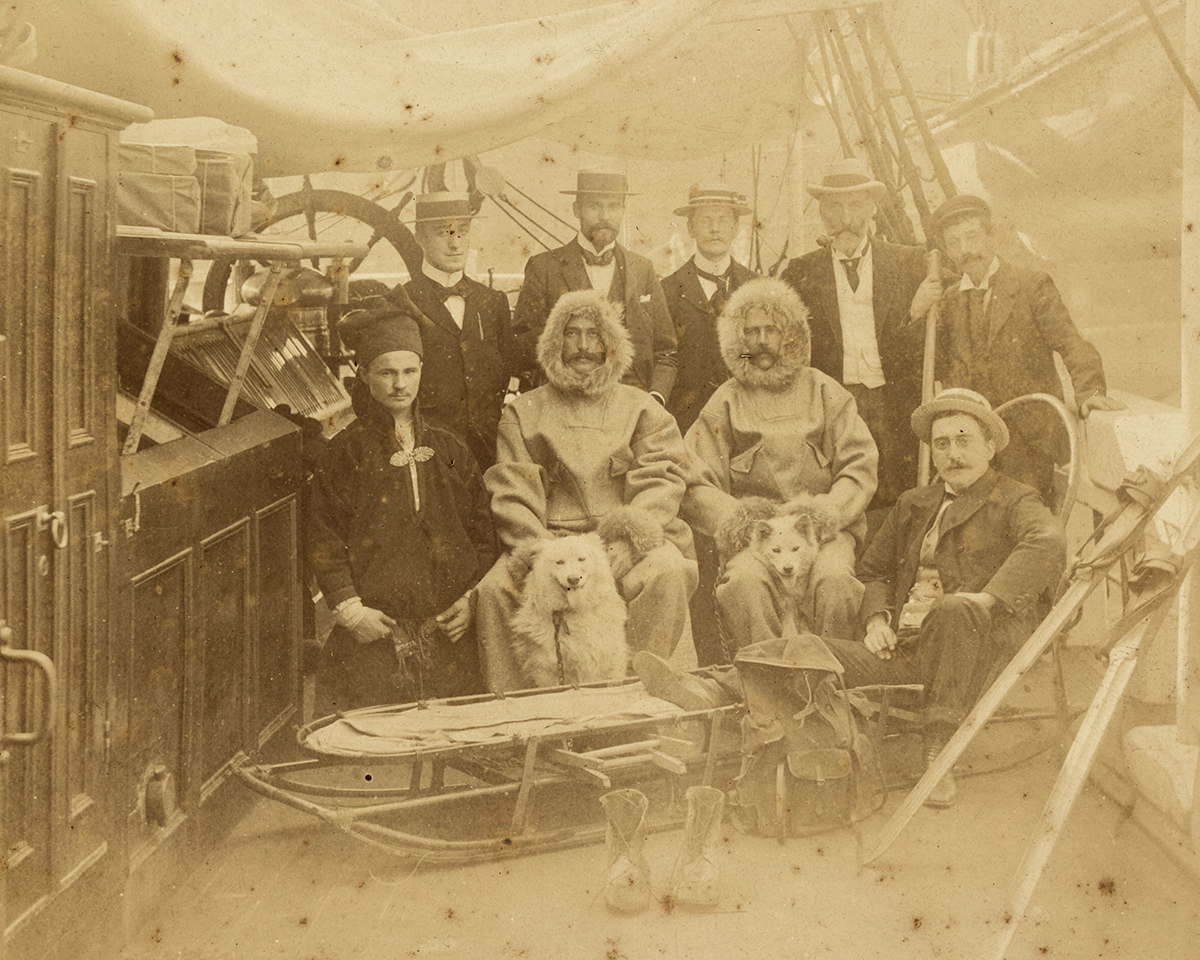
Nine men (Ole Must in traditional Lap dress) and two dogs on deck, Southern Cross, British Antarctic (Southern Cross) Expedition, 1898

His later chronicle of the expedition was critical of aspects of Borchgrevink's leadership, but defended the expedition's scientific achievements. In 1901, Bernacchi would return to Antarctica as a physicist on Scott's Discovery expedition. Another of Borchgrevink's men who later served Scott's expedition, as commander of the relief ship Morning, was William Colbeck, who held a lieutenant's commission in the Royal Naval Reserve. In preparation for the Southern Cross Expedition, Colbeck had taken a course in magnetism at Kew Observatory.

Borchgrevink's assistant zoologist was Hugh Blackwell Evans, a vicar's son from Bristol, who had spent three years on a cattle ranch in Canada and had also been on a sealing voyage to the Kerguelen Islands. The chief zoologist was Nicolai Hanson, a graduate from the Royal Frederick University. Also in the shore party was Herluf Kløvstad, the expedition's medical officer, whose previous appointment had been to a lunatic asylum in Bergen. The others were Anton Fougner, scientific assistant and general handyman; Kolbein Ellifsen, cook and general assistant; and the two Sami dog-handlers, Per Savio and Ole Must, who, at 21 and 20 years of age respectively, were the youngest of the party.

The ship's company, under Captain Bernard Jensen, consisted of 19 Norwegian officers and seamen and one Swedish steward. Jensen was an experienced ice navigator in Arctic and Antarctic waters, and had been with Borchgrevink on Bull's Antarctic voyage in 1894–1895.

== Voyage ==
=== Cape Adare ===
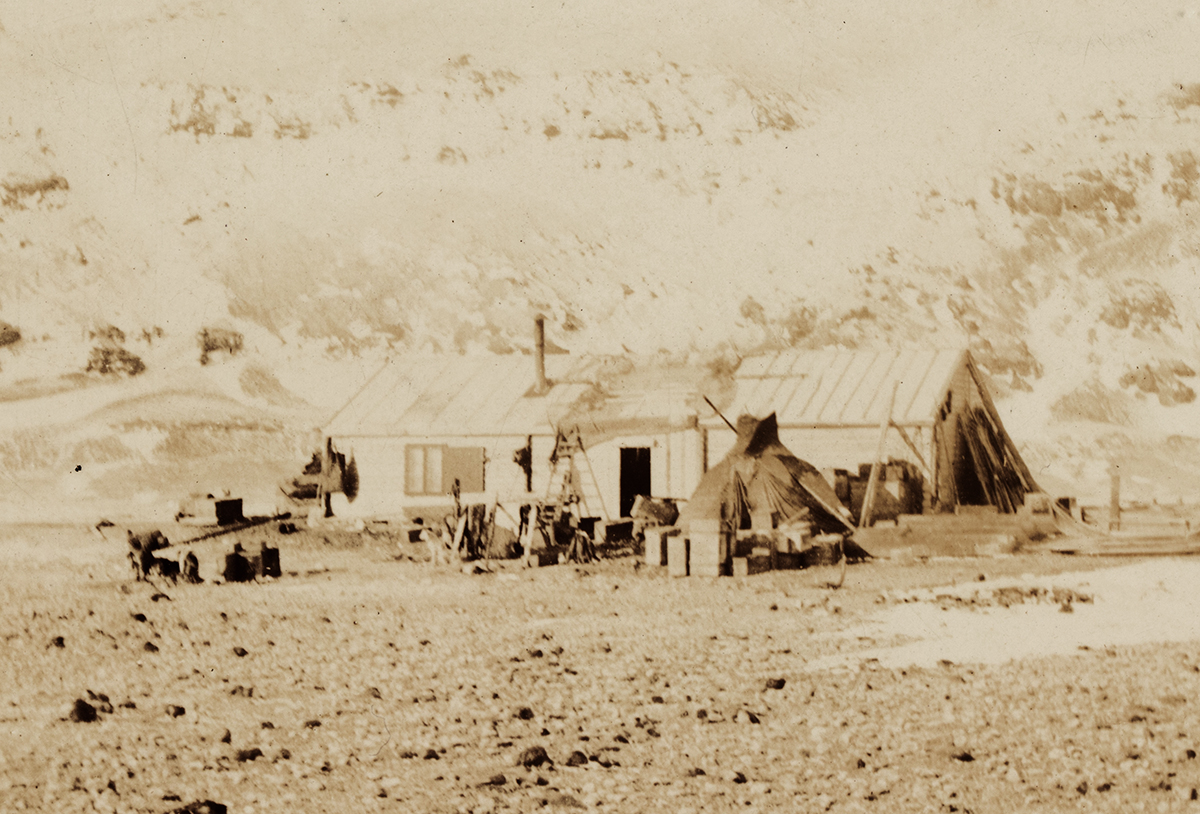
Camp and Hut (summer), Antarctica, British Antarctic (Southern Cross) Expedition, 1899

Southern Cross left London on 23 August 1898, after inspection by the Duke of York (the future King George V), who presented a Union Flag. The ship was carrying 31 men and 90 Siberian sledge dogs, the first to be taken on an Antarctic expedition. After final provisioning in Hobart, Tasmania, Southern Cross sailed for the Antarctic on 19 December. She crossed the Antarctic Circle on 23 January 1899, and after a three-week delay in pack ice sighted Cape Adare on 16 February, before anchoring close to the shore on the following day.

Cape Adare, discovered by Antarctic explorer James Clark Ross during his 1839–43 expedition, lies at the end of a long promontory, below which is the large triangular shingle foreshore where Bull and Borchgrevink had made their brief landing in 1895. This foreshore held one of the largest Adelie penguin rookeries on the entire continent and had ample room, as Borchgrevink had remarked in 1895, "for houses, tents and provisions". The abundance of penguins would provide both a winter larder and a fuel source.

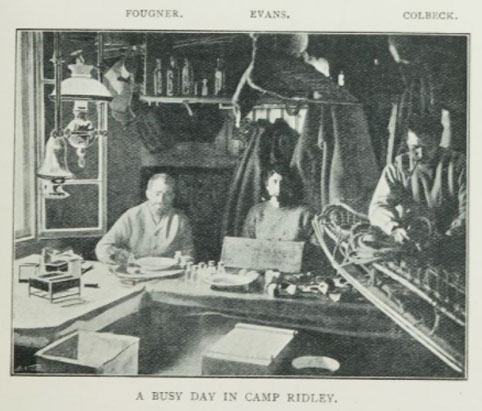
Scene from a hut at Camp Ridley, with Fougner, Evans, and Colbeck.

Unloading began on 17 February. First ashore were the dogs, with their two Sami handlers, Savio and Must, who remained with them and thus became the first men to spend a night on the Antarctic continent. During the next twelve days the rest of the equipment and supplies were landed, and two prefabricated huts were erected, one as living quarters and the other for storage. These were the first buildings erected on the continent. A third structure was contrived from spare materials, to serve as a magnetic observation hut. As accommodation for ten men the "living hut" was small and cramped, and seemingly precarious—Bernacchi later described it as "fifteen feet square, lashed down by cables to the rocky shore". The dogs were housed in kennels fashioned from packing cases. By 2 March the base, christened "Camp Ridley" after Borchgrevink's English mother's maiden name, was fully established, and the Duke of York's flag raised. That day, Southern Cross departed to winter in Australia.

The living hut contained a small ante-room used as a photographic darkroom, and another for taxidermy. Daylight was admitted to the hut via a double-glazed, shuttered window, and through a small square pane high on the northern wall. Bunks were fitted around the outer walls, and a table and stove dominated the centre. During the few remaining weeks of Antarctic summer, members of the party practised travel with dogs and sledges on the sea ice in nearby Robertson Bay, surveyed the coastline, collected specimens of birds and fish, and slaughtered seals and penguins for food and fuel. Outside activities were largely curtailed in mid-May, with the onset of winter.

=== Antarctic winter ===
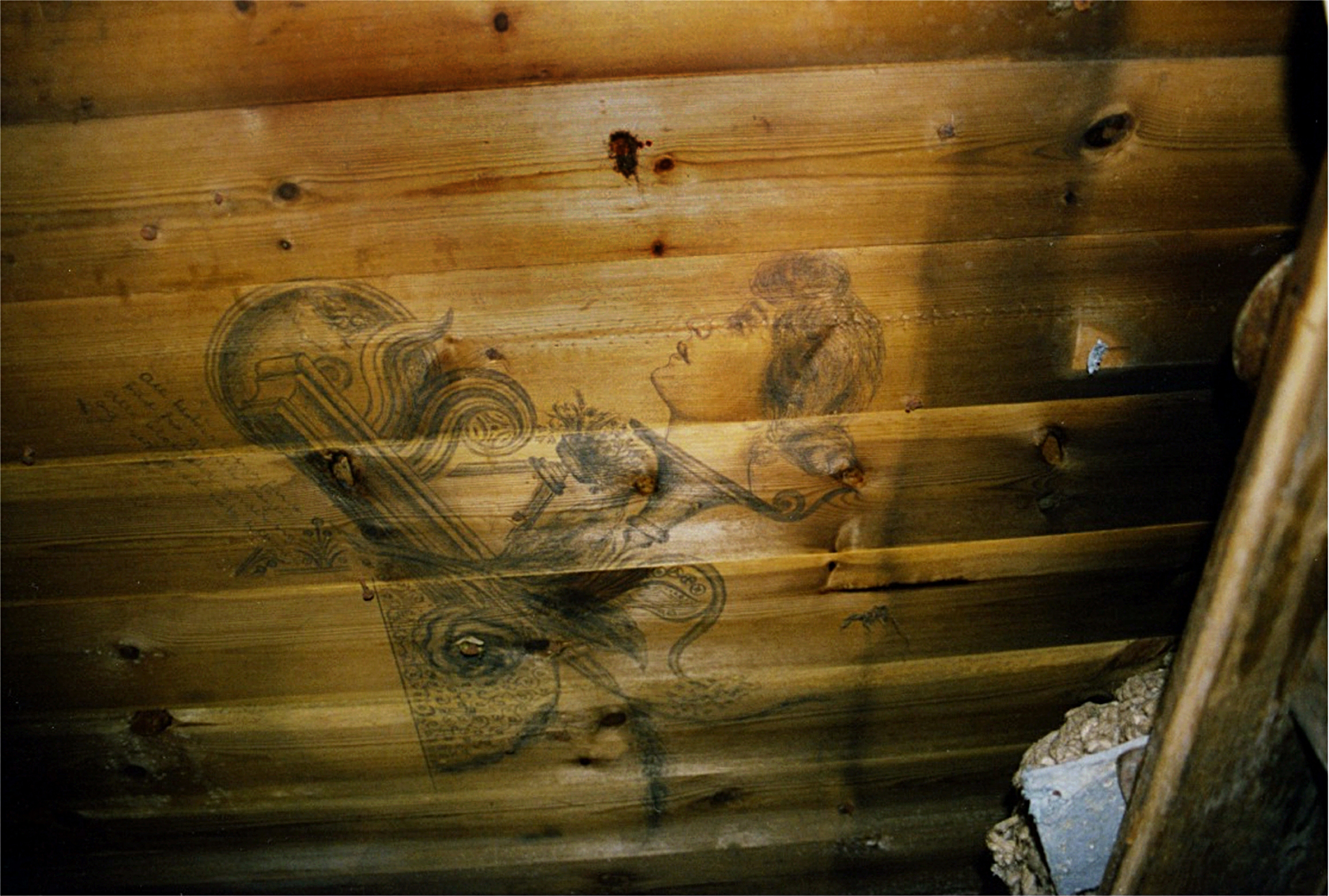
Drawing by Kolbein Ellefsen, on the wall of the Cape Adare hut above his bed, as he passed the time during the Antarctic winter

Winter proved to be a difficult time; Bernacchi wrote of rising boredom and irritation: "Officers and men, ten of us in all, found tempers wearing thin". During this period of confinement, Borchgrevink's weaknesses as a commander were exposed; he was, according to Bernacchi, "in many respects ... not a good leader". The polar historian Ranulph Fiennes later described the conditions as "democratic anarchy", with dirt, disorder and inactivity the order of the day.

Borchgrevink's lack of scientific training, and his inability to make simple observations, were additional matters of concern. Nevertheless, the programme of scientific observations was maintained throughout the winter. Exercise was taken outside the hut when the weather permitted, and as a further diversion Savio improvised a sauna in the snowdrifts. Concerts were held, including lantern slides, songs and readings. During this time there were two near-fatal incidents; in the first, a candle left burning beside a bunk set fire to the hut and caused extensive damage. In the second, three of the party were nearly asphyxiated by coal fire fumes as they slept.

The party was well-supplied with a variety of basic foodstuffs—butter, tea and coffee, herrings, sardines, cheeses, soup, tinned tripe, plum pudding, dry potatoes and vegetables. There were nevertheless complaints about the lack of luxuries, Colbeck noting that "all the tinned fruits supplied for the land party were either eaten on the passage or left on board for the [ship's] crew". There was also a shortage of tobacco; in spite of an intended provision of half a ton (500 kg), only a quantity of chewing tobacco was landed.

The zoologist, Nicolai Hanson, had fallen ill during the winter. On 14 October 1899 he died, apparently of an intestinal disorder, and became the first person to be buried on the Antarctic continent. The grave was dynamited from the frozen ground at the summit of the Cape. Bernacchi wrote: "There amidst profound silence and peace, there is nothing to disturb that eternal sleep except the flight of seabirds". Hanson left a wife, and a baby daughter born after he left for the Antarctic.

As winter gave way to spring, the party prepared for more ambitious inland journeys using the dogs and sledges. Their base camp was cut off from the continent's interior by high mountain ranges, and journeys along the coastline were frustrated by unsafe sea ice. These factors severely restricted their exploration, which was largely confined to the vicinity of Robertson Bay. Here, a small island was discovered, which was named Duke of York Island, after the expedition's patron. A few years later this find was dismissed by members of Scott's Discovery Expedition, who claimed that the island "did not exist", but its position has since been confirmed at 71°38′S, 170°04′E.

=== Ross Sea exploration ===
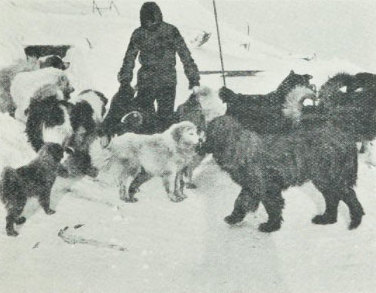
The expedition was the first to use dogs in the Antarctic.

On 28 January 1900 Southern Cross returned. Borchgrevink and his party quickly vacated the camp, and on 2 February he took the ship south into the Ross Sea. Evidence of a hasty and disorderly departure from Cape Adare was noted two years later by members of the Discovery Expedition, when Edward Wilson wrote; "... heaps of refuse all around, and a mountain of provision boxes, dead birds, seals, dogs, sledging gear ... and heaven knows what else".

Southern Cross first called at Possession Island, where the tin box left by Borchgrevink and Bull in 1895 was recovered. They then proceeded southwards, following the Victoria Land coast and discovering further islands, one of which Borchgrevink named after Sir Clements Markham, whose hostility towards the expedition was evidently unchanged by this honour. Southern Cross then sailed on to Ross Island, observed the volcano Mount Erebus, and attempted a landing at Cape Crozier, at the foot of Mount Terror. Here, Borchgrevink and Captain Jensen were almost drowned by a large wave caused by a calving or breakaway of ice from the adjacent Great Ice Barrier. Following the path of James Clark Ross sixty years previously, they proceeded eastwards along the Barrier edge, to find the inlet where, in 1843, Ross had reached his farthest south. Observations indicated that the Barrier edge had moved some 30 statute miles (50 km) south since Ross's time, which meant that the ship were already south of Ross's record. Borchgrevink was determined to make a landing on the Barrier itself, and in the vicinity of Ross's inlet he found a spot where the ice sloped sufficiently to suggest that a landing was possible. On 16 February he, Colbeck and Savio landed with dogs and a sledge, ascended to the Barrier surface, and then journeyed a few miles south to a point which they calculated as 78°50′S, a new Farthest South record. They were the first persons to travel on the Barrier surface, earning Amundsen's approbation: "We must acknowledge that, by ascending the Barrier, Borchgrevink opened the way to the south, and threw aside the greatest obstacle to the expeditions that followed". Close to the same spot ten years later, Amundsen would establish his base camp "Framheim", prior to his successful South Pole journey.

On its passage northward, Southern Cross halted at Franklin Island, off the Victoria Land coast, and made a series of magnetic calculations. These indicated that the location of the South Magnetic Pole was, as expected, within Victoria Land, but further north and further west than had previously been assumed. The party then sailed for home, crossing the Antarctic Circle on 28 February. On 1 April, news of their safe return was sent by telegram from Bluff, New Zealand. The dogs were left on Native Island, New Zealand. Due to quarantine requirements, many of the dogs were killed but a few remained. 9 of the remaining dogs were bought by Ernest Shackleton.

== Aftermath ==
Southern Cross returned to England in June 1900, to a cool welcome; public attention was distracted by the preparations for the upcoming Discovery Expedition, due to sail the following year. Borchgrevink meanwhile pronounced his voyage a great success, stating: "The Antarctic regions might be another Klondyke"—in terms of the prospects for fishing, sealing, and mineral extraction. He had proved that it was possible for a resident expedition to survive an Antarctic winter, and had made a series of geographical discoveries. These included new islands in Robertson's Bay and the Ross Sea, and the first landings on Franklin Island, Coulman Island, Ross Island and the Great Ice Barrier. The survey of the Victoria Land coast had revealed the "important geographical discovery ... of the Southern Cross Fjord, as well as the excellent camping place at the foot of Mount Melbourne". The most significant exploration achievement, Borchgrevink thought, was the scaling of the Great Ice Barrier and the journey to "the furthest south ever reached by man".

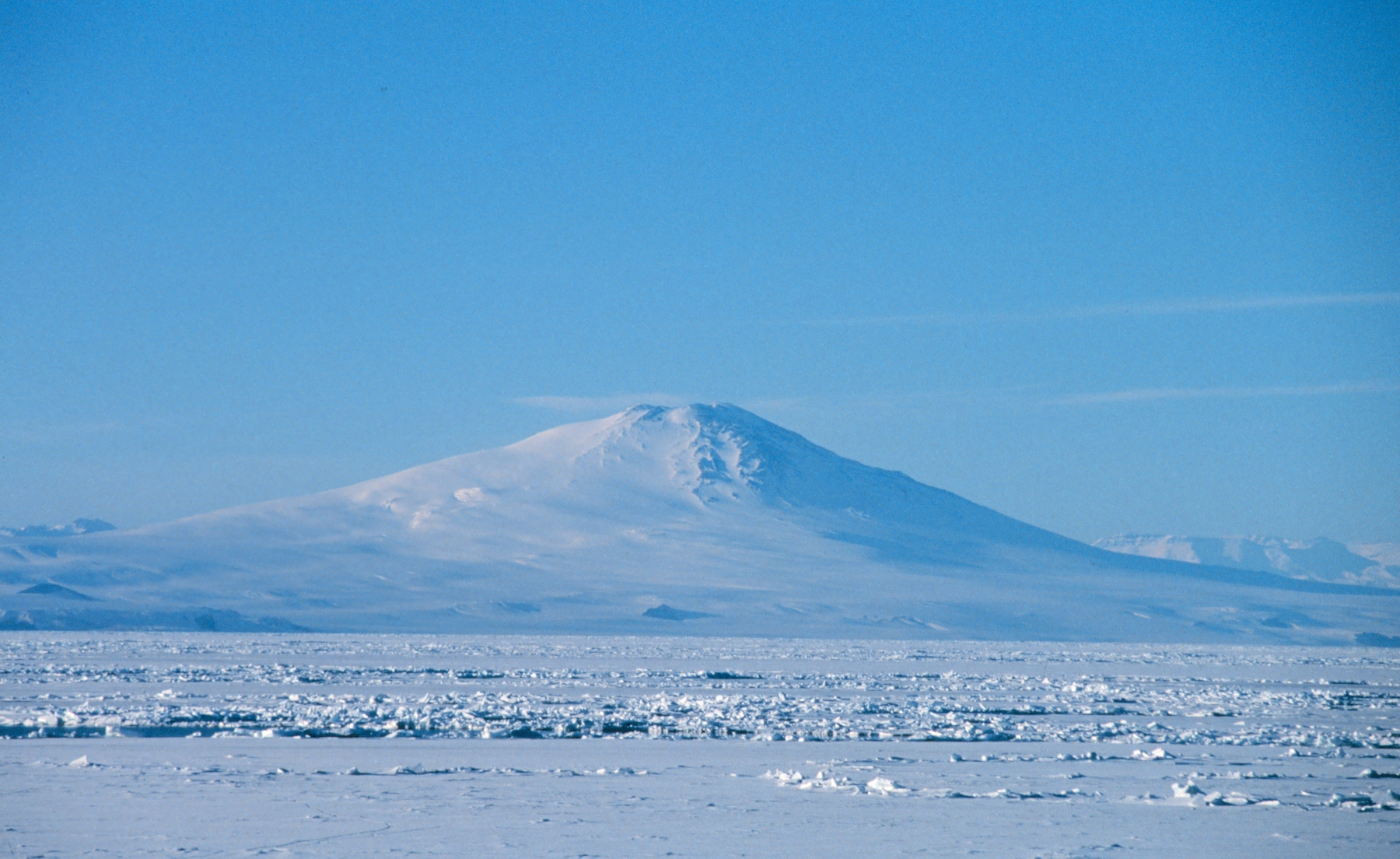
Mount Melbourne, on Victoria Land, at the foot of which Borchgrevink discovered "an excellent camping place"

Borchgrevink's account of the expedition, First on the Antarctic Continent, was published the following year; the English edition, much of which may have been embroidered by Newnes's staff, was criticised for its "journalistic" style and for its bragging tone. The author, whom commentators recognised was "not known for either his modesty or his tact", embarked on a lecture tour of England and Scotland, but the reception was generally poor.

Despite the unexplained disappearance of many of Hanson's notes, Hugh Robert Mill described the expedition as "interesting as a dashing piece of scientific work". The meteorological and magnetic conditions of Victoria Land had been recorded for a full year; the location of the South Magnetic Pole had been calculated (though not visited); samples of the continent's natural fauna and flora, and of its geology, had been collected. Borchgrevink also claimed the discovery of new insect and shallow-water fauna species, proving "bi-polarity" (existence of species in proximity to the North and South poles).

The geographical establishments in Britain and abroad were slow to give formal recognition to the expedition. The Royal Geographical Society gave Borchgrevink a fellowship, and other medals and honours eventually followed from Norway, Denmark and the United States, but the expedition's achievements were not widely recognised. Markham persisted in describing Borchgrevink as cunning and unprincipled; Amundsen's warm tribute was a lone approving voice. According to Scott's biographer David Crane, if Borchgrevink had been a British naval officer his expedition would have been treated differently, but "a Norwegian seaman/schoolmaster was never going to be taken seriously". A belated recognition came in 1930, long after Markham's death, when the Royal Geographical Society presented Borchgrevink with its Patron's Medal. It admitted that "justice had not been done at the time to the pioneer work of the Southern Cross expedition", and that the magnitude of the difficulties it had overcome had previously been underestimated. After the expedition, Borchgrevink lived quietly, largely out of the public eye. He died in Oslo on 21 April 1934.

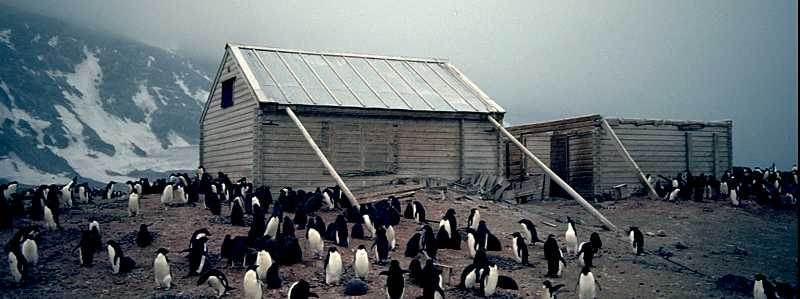
Borchgrevink's hut (HSM 22), still stands today at its original location as the first and oldest known housing on Antarctica, Cape Adare.
