= Adare (disambiguation) =

Adare is a village in County Limerick, Ireland.

Adare may also refer to:

- Adare GAA, GAA club based in Adare
- Adare Manor, manor house in Adare
- Adare Productions, Irish entertainment company
- Elizabeth Adare (born 1949), English actress, television presenter and child psychologist
- Mansion in South Australia built for Daniel Cudmore (businessman)

== Geography ==
- Adare Peninsula, peninsula in Antarctica
- Cape Adare, cape in Antarctica
- Adare Saddle, mountain pass in Antarctica
- Adare Seamounts, seamount in the Southern Ocean
- Adare Trough, oceanic basin in Antarctica
- Adare, Queensland, a locality in the Lockyer Valley Region, Queensland, Australia
