= Foyn Island =

Island of Antarctica

Coordinates: 71°56′S 171°4′E

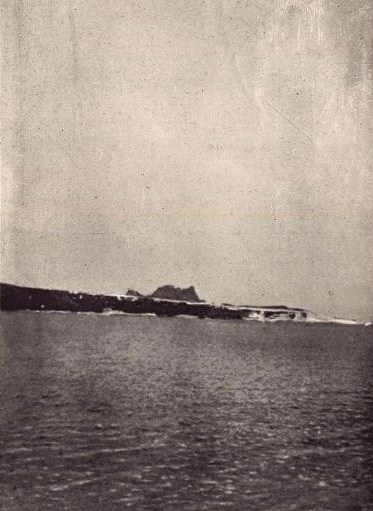
Photography of Foyn Island in 1895, taken by Henrik Bull

Foyn Island, also known as Svend Foyn Island, is the second largest island in the Possession Islands, East Antarctica, lying 6 kilometres (4 mi) south-west of Possession Island. An Adélie penguin rookery covers much of the island, which is often included in the itinerary of Antarctic cruises.

== History ==
The island was explored by a Norwegian whaling expedition of 1894–95, led by Henrik Johan Bull in the Antarctic, captained by Leonard Kristensen, and was named for Svend Foyn, primary sponsor of the expedition.

=== Historic site ===
A message post comprising a pole with an attached box was erected on the island on 16 January 1895 by the Norwegian expedition. It was examined and found intact by the British Antarctic Expedition of 1898–1900, and later sighted from the beach by the USS Edisto in 1956 and USCGS Glacier in 1965. The site has been designated a Historic Site or Monument (HSM 65), following a proposal by New Zealand, Norway and the United Kingdom to the Antarctic Treaty Consultative Meeting.

== Important Bird Area ==
A 224 ha site comprising the whole island has been designated an Important Bird Area (IBA) by BirdLife International because it supports a breeding colony of about 30,000 Adélie penguins. A substantial breeding colony of south polar skuas was reported from the island in the 1980s.

== See also ==
- List of Antarctic and Subantarctic islands
- St. Marie Peak
