= Alexander von Tunzelmann =

New Zealand explorer

Alexander Francis Henry von Tunzelmann
- Born: 15 June 1877; Nelson, New Zealand
- Died: 19 September 1957 (aged 80); Invercargill, New Zealand
- Occupation: Crew member of whaling ship
- Children: 5
- Relatives: Nicholas von Tunzelmann; Adrienne von Tunzelmann; Alex von Tunzelmann

Alexander Francis Henry von Tunzelmann (15 June 1877 – 19 September 1957) was a New Zealand crew member of the Norwegian whaling ship Antarctic was part of the first group known with certainty to have set foot on the mainland of Antarctica—at Cape Adare on 24 January 1895. It is possible that the Anglo-American sealer John Davis achieved this feat 74 years earlier, on 7 February 1821, but his journal entry is open to interpretation.

== Family background ==
Alexander's ancestors were the von Tunzelmann family who moved from Prussia to Livonia (present-day Estonia) where they were members of the Baltic German Ritterschaft or nobility. Two brothers and a sister from the family settled in New Zealand.

He was born in Nelson and died in Invercargill. He had five children.

== Circumstances of the landing ==
The voyage of the whaling ship Antarctic, captained by Leonard Kristensen and financed by Henrik Johan Bull, put a boat ashore on 24 January 1895 in the vicinity of Cape Adare, at the northern extremity of the Victoria Land. The boat held six men, including Kristensen, Bull, Carsten Borchgrevink, and the 17-year-old von Tunzelmann. All of them set foot on land within moments of each other, so credit is sometimes given, or claimed for each.

== Recognition ==
In 1984, the place von Tunzelmann landed was officially named Von Tunzelmann Point by the New Zealand Antarctic Place Names Committee.

== See also ==
- Carsten Borchgrevink
- Henryk Bull
- John Davis (sealer)
- Victoria Land
