= Svend Foyn =

Norwegian whaler (1809–1894)

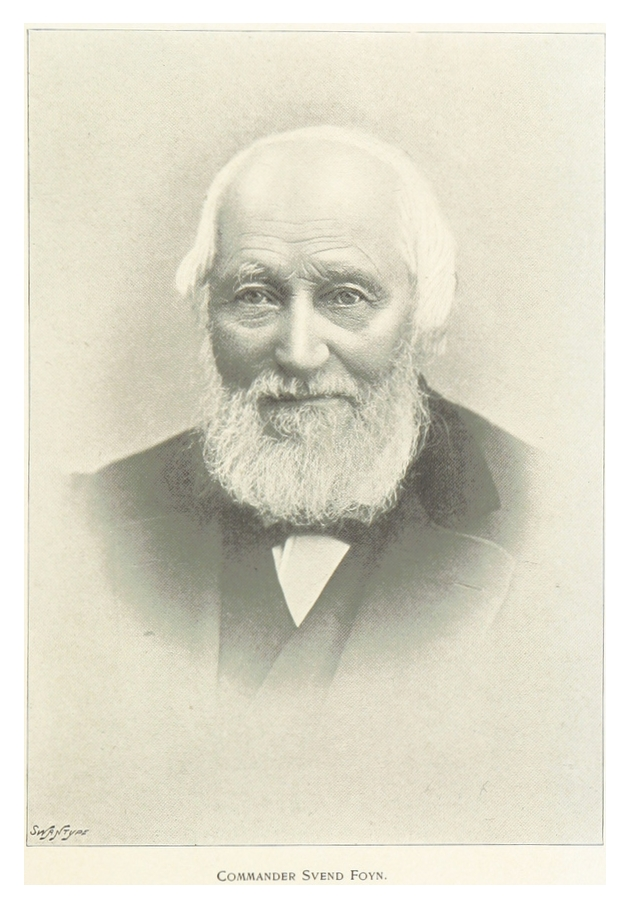
- Born: July 9, 1809; Tønsberg, Norway
- Died: November 30, 1894 (aged 85); Nøtterø, Norway
- Occupations: Whaling; shipping magnate; philanthropist
- Known for: Pioneering modern whaling, invention of the explosive harpoon cannon
- Awards: Order of St. Olav (Grand Cross)

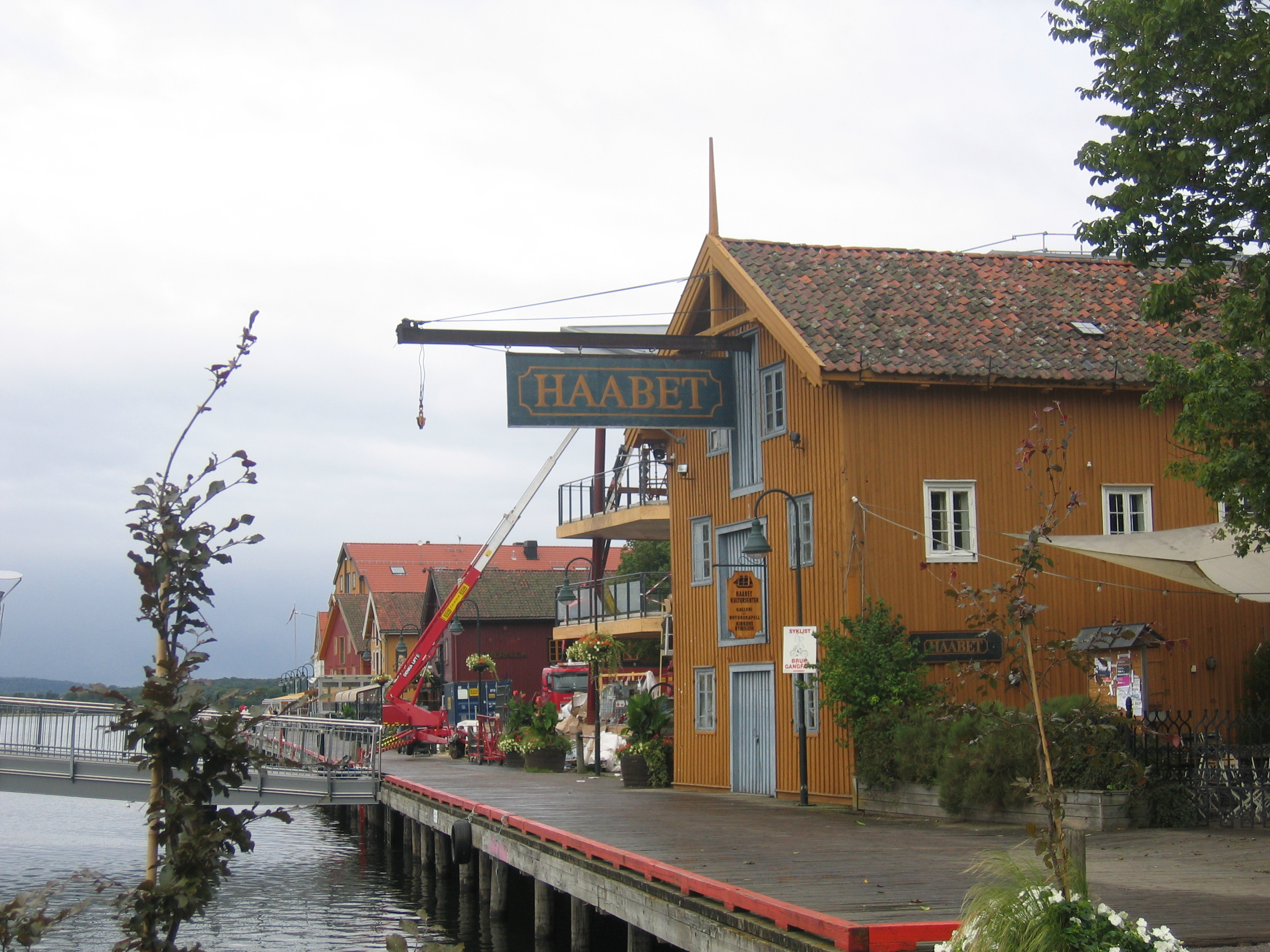
Foynegården in Tønsberg, Norway

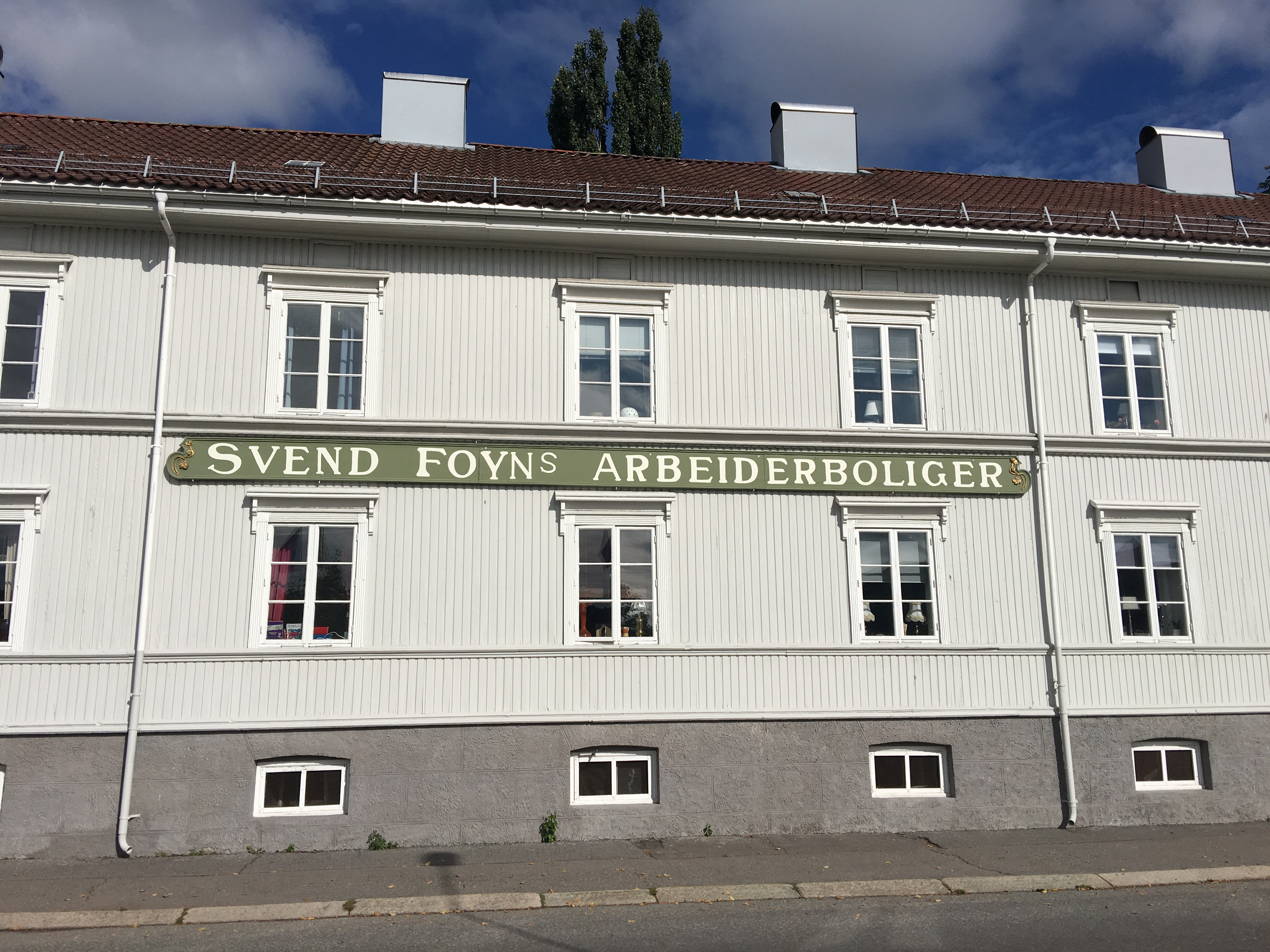
Svend Foyns Arbeiderboliger at Tønsberg in Vestfold

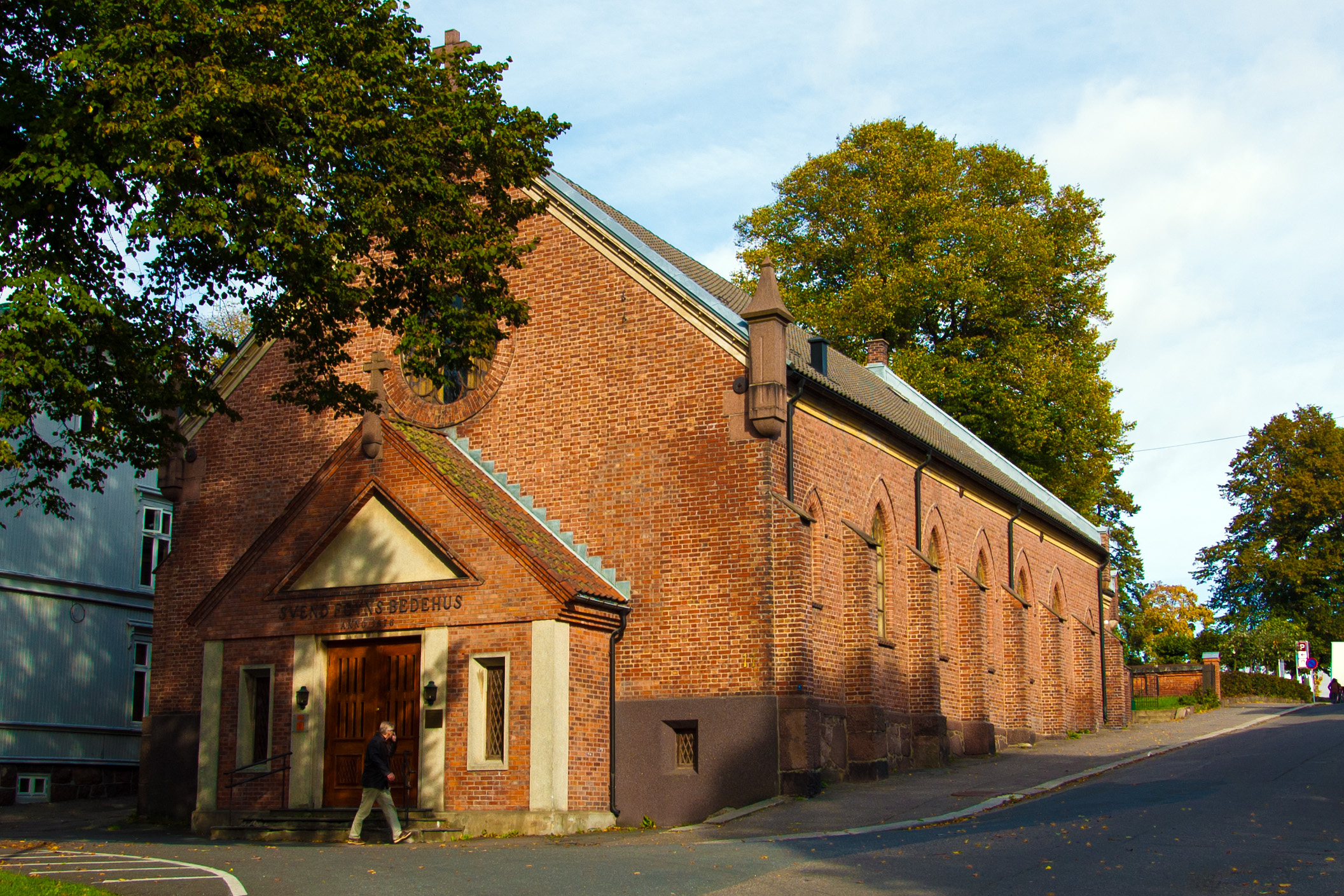
Svend Foyn Chapel in Tonsberg

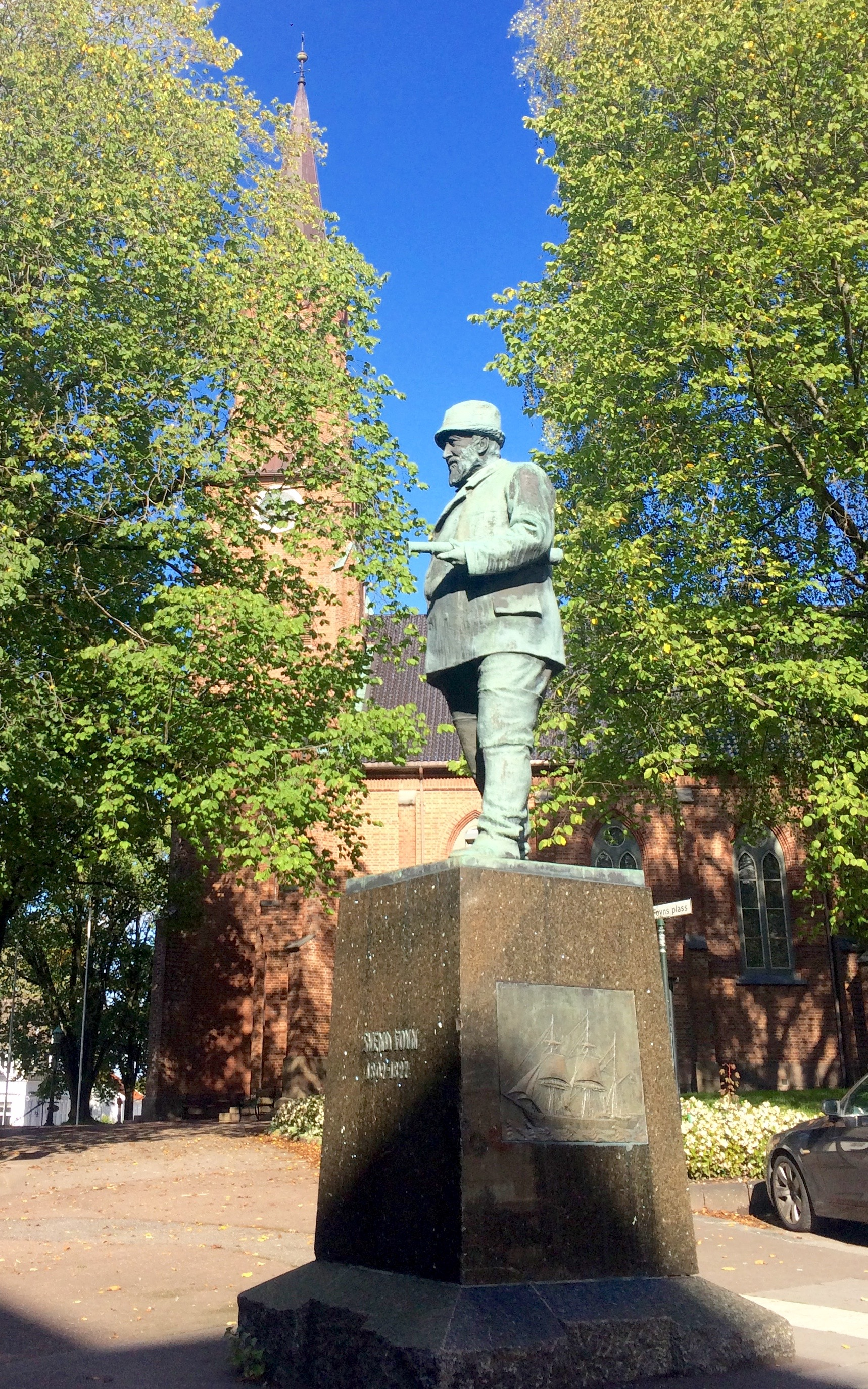
Statue of Svend Foyn by Tonsberg Cathedral

Svend Foyn (July 9, 1809 – November 30, 1894) was a Norwegian whaling, shipping magnate and philanthropist. He pioneered revolutionary methods for hunting and processing whales. Svend Foyn introduced the modern harpoon cannon and brought whaling into a modern age. He is also recognized as a pioneer who introduced sealing to Vestfold County.

== Background ==
Svend Foyn was born in the neighborhood of Foynegården at Tønsberg in Vestfold county, Norway. He was the son of shipmaster Laurentius Foyn (1772–1813) and Benthe Marie Ager (1781–1842). Foyn was fatherless at four years of age and his mother came to characterize his upbringing. By age 11, Foyn sent to sea on the family ships. He took navigational exams in Kristiansand at age 19 and from 1833 he was a master sailor.

== Career ==
His ship initially transported lumber from Sweden and Norway to European ports and returned with manufactured goods. Started in 1846, Foyn was on the expedition for seals and walrus. By the 1860s, he had a fleet of whaling ships. In 1863, he built the world's first steam-powered catcher. Within four years he experimented with whaling on the coast of Finnmark county.

Foyn was the first to hit the whale with grenade harpoon. Svend Foyn patented his grenade harpoon gun in 1870. He modified existing designs and utilized ideas developed by Erik Eriksen. It consisted of a cannon that fired a barbed explosive head harpoon. Aimed and fired, the harpoon barb would hook into the whale. A moment later an explosive charge in the head of the harpoon would inflict a mortal wound. Then the whale was retrieved by a winch. Once alongside the whaling vessel, the whale was pumped full of air to keep it afloat, as the whale was moved to the location of processing.

The whole process of whaling was changed drastically when Svend Foyn invented the exploding harpoon. By doing so, he removed much of the danger from whaling although it remained a very dangerous undertaking. His invention increased the efficiency by which whales could be captured and made it possible to hunt the larger and faster rorquals, the largest group of baleen whales.

Svend Foyn introduced mechanized, steam-powered catcher boats equipped with bow-chaser deck cannons and heavy-caliber harpoons that exploded on impact. Foyn constructed his 86-ton, seven-knot Spes et Fides, the first steam-powered whale catcher. The ship was equipped with seven whale guns separately mounted on the forecastle, each firing a harpoon and grenade. The vessel was 94 feet (29 m) long, with a 20-horsepower (15-kW) engine. It could reach a speed of 7 knots (13 km/h).

With this development, he launched Norway into a new and profitable industry. After years of perfecting a cannon that could fire a grenade and harpoon simultaneously, Foyn finally managed to catch 30 whales in 1868. These increased efficiency and volume, enabling the harvest not only of all of the species that had been hunted for, but also the largest species which had eluded all previous hunting technologies. The whaling industry was in decline when Foyn first began his development of the bow-mounted harpoon cannon. Foyn's eventual successful development of the cannon, in combination with fast and sleek steam-powered catcher vessels, ushered in a modern whaling industry that was to become dominated first by the Norwegians, then the British and finally the Russians and Japanese.

The Antarctic Expedition of 1894–95 was funded by Svend Foyn and led by Henrik Johan Bull. The two-year expedition was a whaling expedition that sailed to the Ross Sea aboard the ship Antarctic. The crew included Carsten Borchgrevink, who later led the Southern Cross Expedition to Antarctica.

== Philanthropy ==
By processing the whale's raw materials in its own facilities, Foyn steadily increase his profit and accumulated a considerable fortune. He donated funds for several purposes including worker housing in Tonsberg (Svend Foyns Arbeiderboliger). He gave funds to benefit his employees and later bequeathed his fortune to a mission fund. Foyn restored and protected workers' homes.

In 1865 there were 73 flats and 303 residents. There was a library, prayer room and the country's first kindergarten. Svend Foyn was not only a man before his time in the modern whaling industry, but also as regards social conditions. Svend and Lena Foyn's Memorial, a home for elderly ladies was founded by Lena Foyn in 1896. Svend Foyn Chapel (Svend Foyns bedehus) was consecrated November 5, 1876. There was seating for 500 people and at the time it was among Norway's largest and most beautiful chapels.

== Personal life ==
Svend Foyn wed Elise Amalie Tvede in 1839 in a marriage which ended in an amicable separation in 1842. His former wife, later known as Elise Wærenskjold, immigrated to Texas in 1847. Foyn maintained a long distance friendship with his ex-wife throughout the remainder of their lives. In 1849, Foyn married Magdalene Margrethe "Lena" Bull, (1824–1905), daughter of the master and shipowner Henrik Johan Bull (1793–1826) and Andrea Mathea Bull (1796–1844).

Foyn was entered as a Knight in the Royal Norwegian Order of St. Olav in 1853, was promoted to Commander in 1870 and received the Grand Cross in 1893. Foyn died in 1894 in Nøtterøy Municipality, followed by the death of his widow Lena in 1905. Both were buried in Tønsberg gamle kirkegård located in Tønsberg city center.

The couple had established the Svend Foyn and Wife Mission Fund (Svend Foyn and Hustrus Missionsfond) with an endowment of over 3 million kr. The fund was intended for the benefit of their workforce and for the welfare of their families.

== Memorials ==
The former residence of Svend and Lena Foyn on Storgaten in Tønsberg is a protected house. Built in 1700, Svend Foyn's complete townhouse complex is a shipowner's house from 1750. Svend Foyn's childhood home has been protected since 1924. It is the only complete house of its style from the 18th century in the town.

His statue by Norwegian sculptor Anders Svor (1864–1929) was erected outside the cathedral in Tønsberg (Tønsberg domkirke) in 1915.

== Legacy ==
A number of locations related to Antarctica and the surrounding area are named for Svend Foyn, including:

- Foyn Island: the second-largest island in the Possession Islands of East Antarctica.
- Foyn Coast: on the east coast of the Antarctic Peninsula between Cape Alexander and Cape Northrop.
- Foyn Point: marking the north side of the entrance to Exasperation Inlet, on the east coast of Graham Land.
- Foyn Harbor: anchorage between Nansen Island and Enterprise Island in Wilhelmina Bay, off the west coast of Graham Land.
- Foynøya: an island in the Arctic north of Nordaustlandet, Svalbard, is named after him.

Additionally streets were named for him in numerous Norwegian communities including: Tønsberg, Lørenskog, Stavanger, Vadsø, Båtsfjord, and Andenes on the island of Andøya.

When a Norwegian shipping company purchased the Canadian full-rigger William D. Lawrence in 1883 it was renamed Kommandør Svend Foyn.

== Additional sources ==
- Bull, Henrik Johan (1898) Sydover. Ekspeditionen til Sydishavet i 1893-1895 (British Library, Historical Print Editions) ISBN 978-1-241-41827-4
- Gill, Peter (2001) Whales Dolphins & Porpoises (Springfield, MA.: Federal Street Press) ISBN 978-18-92-85926-6
- Jacobsen, Alf R. (2008) Svend Foyn. Fangstmann og nasjonsbygger (Oslo:Aschehoug) ISBN 978-82-03-23216-9
- Nielsen, Aage Krarup (1942) En Hvalfangerfaerd: Gennem Troperne til Sydishavet (Kobenhavn: Gyldendalske Boghandel, Nordisk Forlag)
- Tønnessen, J.N.; And A.O. Johnsen (1982) The History Of Modern Whaling (translated By R.I. Christophersen. University Of California Press) ISBN 978-0520039735
