= Bleiksøya =

Island nature reserve of Norway

Coordinates: 70°06′12″N 18°30′11″E

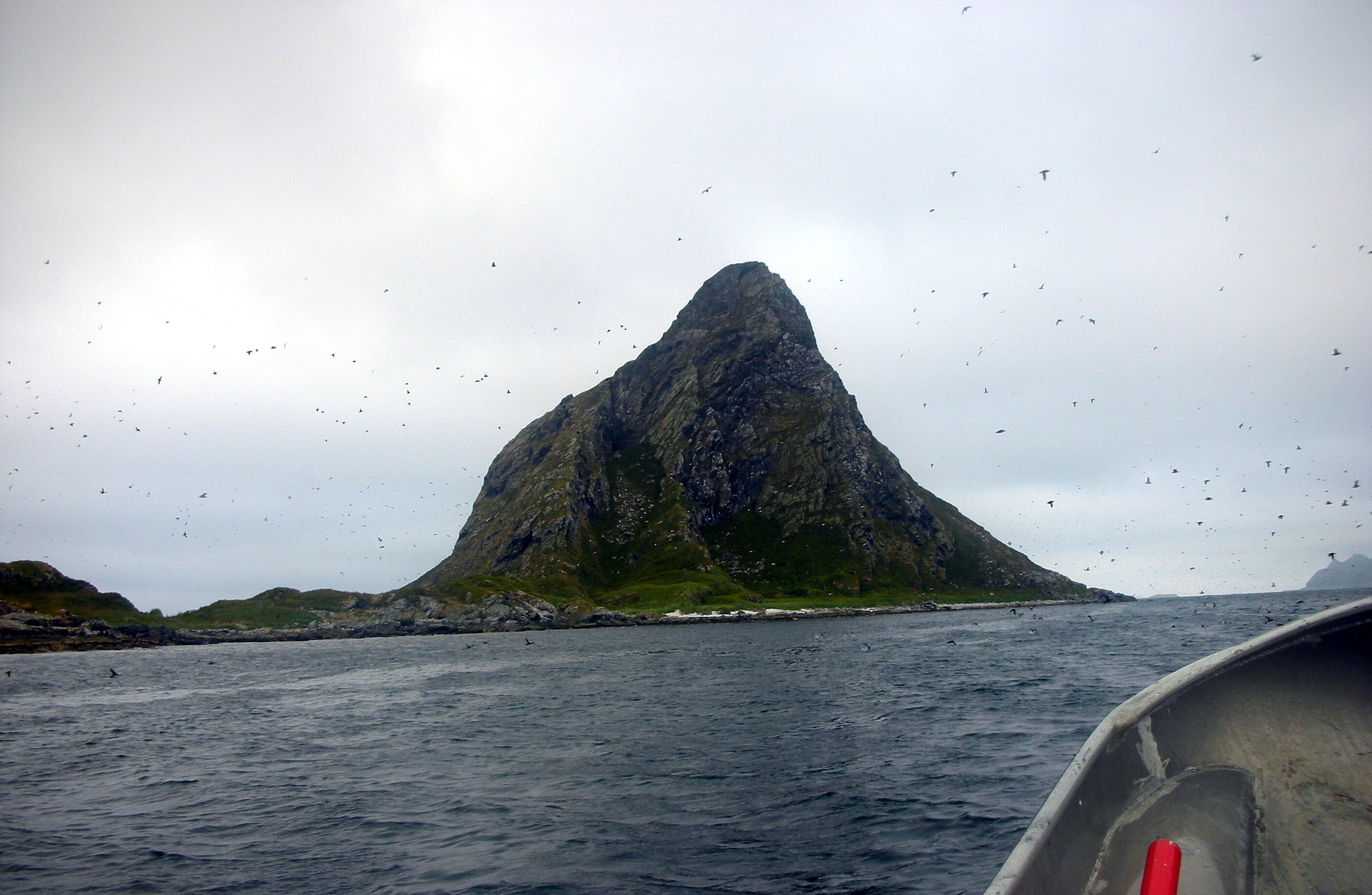
Bleiksøya

Bleiksøya or Bleiksøy is a small (15 ha) uninhabited island and nature reserve in near the fishing village of Bleik on the island of Andøya in Andøy Municipality of Nordland county in Arctic northern Norway. It is a steep pyramidal island with grassy slopes and cliffs surrounded by gullies and boulder scree. It, with its adjacent marine waters, has been designated a 530 ha Important Bird Area (IBA) by BirdLife International (BLI) because it supports a large breeding colony of Atlantic puffins. A 2016 assessment by BLI found that the puffin population was threatened by climate change and severe weather and had declined by over 90% from a historical estimate of 75,000 breeding pairs.
