= Bleiksvatnet =

Lake in Nordland, Norway

Bleiksvatnet (Norwegian); Storvatnet (Norwegian)
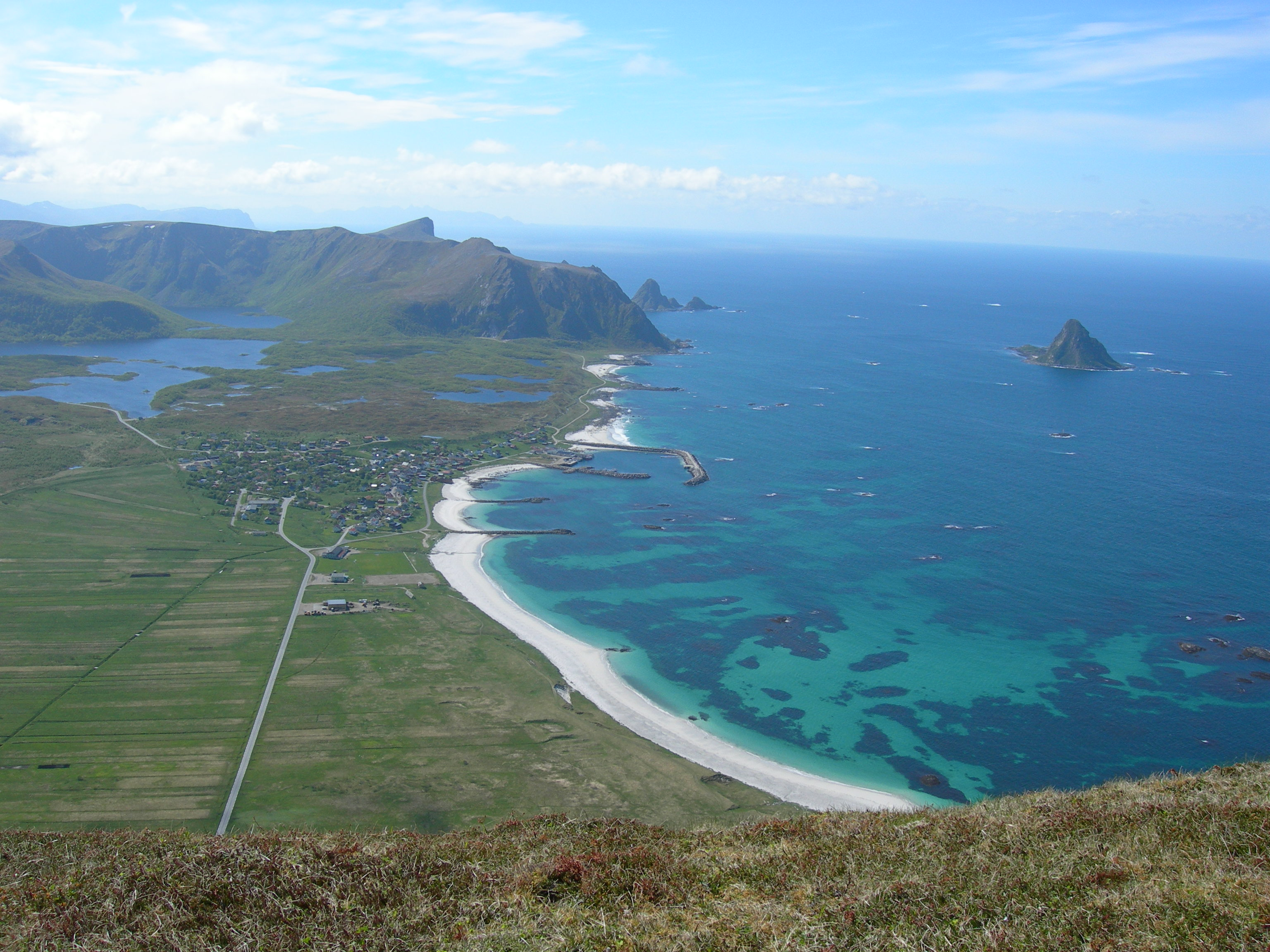
- View of the village and the lake above it.
- Interactive map of the lake
- Location: Nordland
- Coordinates: 69.251678°N 15.951733°E
- Basin countries: Norway
- Max. length: 2.3 kilometres (1.4 mi)
- Max. width: 1.6 kilometres (0.99 mi)
- Surface area: 1.74 km^{2} (0.67 sq mi)
- Surface elevation: 28 metres (92 ft)
- References: NVE

Bleiksvatnet (Norwegian) or Storvatnet (Norwegian) is a lake in Andøy Municipality in Nordland county, Norway. The 1.74-square-kilometre (0.67 sq mi) lake is located just south of the village of Bleik on the island of Andøya. The lake sits at an elevation of 28 metres (92 ft) above sea level. The Bleikmorenen nature reserve is located on the northern shore of the lake.

== See also ==
- List of lakes in Norway
