= Adare Seamounts =

Seamounts in Balleny Basin

- Location within Pacific Ocean

Location
- Location: Balleny Basin
- Coordinates: 70°0′S 171°30′E

Geology
- Volcanic arc/chain: Seamount group

Adare Seamounts, also known as Adare Mountains, are the seamounts in Balleny Basin named in association with Adare Peninsula and Cape Adare. Name approved by the Advisory Committee on Undersea Features, June 1988.
