= Gertrude Rock =

Gertrude Rock (71°17′21″S 170°13′0″E) was the northern of two rocks called The Sisters, off the northern extremity of Cape Adare, Victoria Land, Antarctica. The Sisters as a group were named by the British Antarctic Expedition, 1898–1900; the individual rocks were named by Victor Campbell, leader of the Northern Party of the British Antarctic Expedition, 1910–13, at the suggestion of George Murray Levick, after Gertrude and Rose, two sisters mentioned in a favorite comic song of the time. By 2004 the islet had disappeared from the Ross Sea. This rock used to lie situated on the Pennell Coast, a portion of Antarctica lying between Cape Williams and Cape Adare.
