= John Davis (sealer) =

Supposed first human visitor of Antarctica

- Born: 1784; Surrey, England
- Died: Unknown
- Occupation: Seal hunter
- Known for: Debated as the first man on Antarctica

Captain John Davis (born 1784 in Surrey, England) was an American sailor and seal hunter from Connecticut, United States. It is thought that he may have been the first person to set foot on Antarctica, on 7 February 1821, shortly after the first sightings of the new continent, all in 1820, by Fabian Gottlieb von Bellingshausen and Mikhail Lazarev on (28 January), Edward Bransfield on (30 January), Andrew MacFarlane (October; with a landing included) and Nathaniel Palmer in (November).

== Antarctic claim ==
Some of Davis' crew from the American sealing ship Cecilia may have landed at Hughes Bay (64°01'S), near the northernmost tip of the Antarctic Peninsula, for less than an hour while looking for seals. The ship's logbook entry reads:

Commences with open Cloudy Weather and Light winds a standing for a Large Body of Land in that Direction SE at 10A.M. close in with it our Boat and Sent her on Shore to look for Seal at 11A.M. the Boat returned but find no sign of Seal at noon our Latitude was 64°01' South Stood up a Large Bay, the Land high and covered intirely [sic] with snow the wind coming Round to the North & Eastward with Thick weather Tacked ship and headed off Shore. At 4P.M. fresh Gale and Thick weather with snow ... Ends with Strong Gales at ENE Concluded to make the Best of our way for the Ship I think this Southern Land to be a Continent.

These men made the earliest recorded claim of having set foot on the newly discovered continent of Antarctica.

The first undisputed landing on Antarctica did not occur for another 74 years, on 24 January 1895, when a group of men from the Norwegian ship Antarctic went ashore to collect geological specimens at Cape Adare. The group included the Norwegians Henrik Johan Bull and Carsten Borchgrevink and the New Zealander Alexander von Tunzelmann.

== Legacy ==
The strip of coast on the Antarctic Peninsula where the men are alleged to have gone ashore is now called the Davis Coast.

== See also ==
- List of Antarctic expeditions
- Spanish ship San Telmo
