= Adare Trough =

Undersea trough

Coordinates: 70°2′S 172°30′E

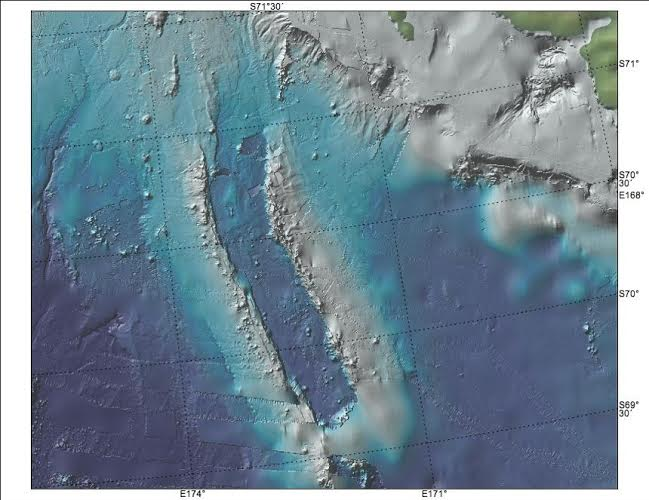
Adare Trough

The Adare Trough is an undersea trough name proposed by Steven C. Cande at the Scripps Institution of Oceanography. It was named in association with the Adare Peninsula and Cape Adare. The name was approved by the Advisory Committee on Undersea Features in September 1997.
