= Possession Islands =

Islands of Antarctica

- Location within Antarctica

Geography
- Location: Antarctica
- Coordinates: 71°56′S 171°10′E.

Administration
- Antarctica
- Administered under the Antarctic Treaty System

Demographics
- Population: Uninhabited

The Possession Islands (71°56′S 171°10′E) are a group of small islands and rocks extending over an area of about 7 nautical miles (13 km; 8.1 mi), lying in the western part of the Ross Sea, lying 5 nautical miles (9.3 km; 5.8 mi) south-east of Cape McCormick, in Victoria Land, Antarctica. The Possession Islands were named by Captain James Clark Ross, Royal Navy, in commemoration of the planting of the British flag here on January 12, 1841.

== Important Bird Area ==
A 276 ha (680 acres) site comprising the whole of Possession Island has been designated an Important Bird Area (IBA) by BirdLife International because it supports about 111,000 breeding pairs of Adélie penguins, based on ground counts made from 1981 to 2012. A significant south polar skua colony is also present on the island.

== Features ==
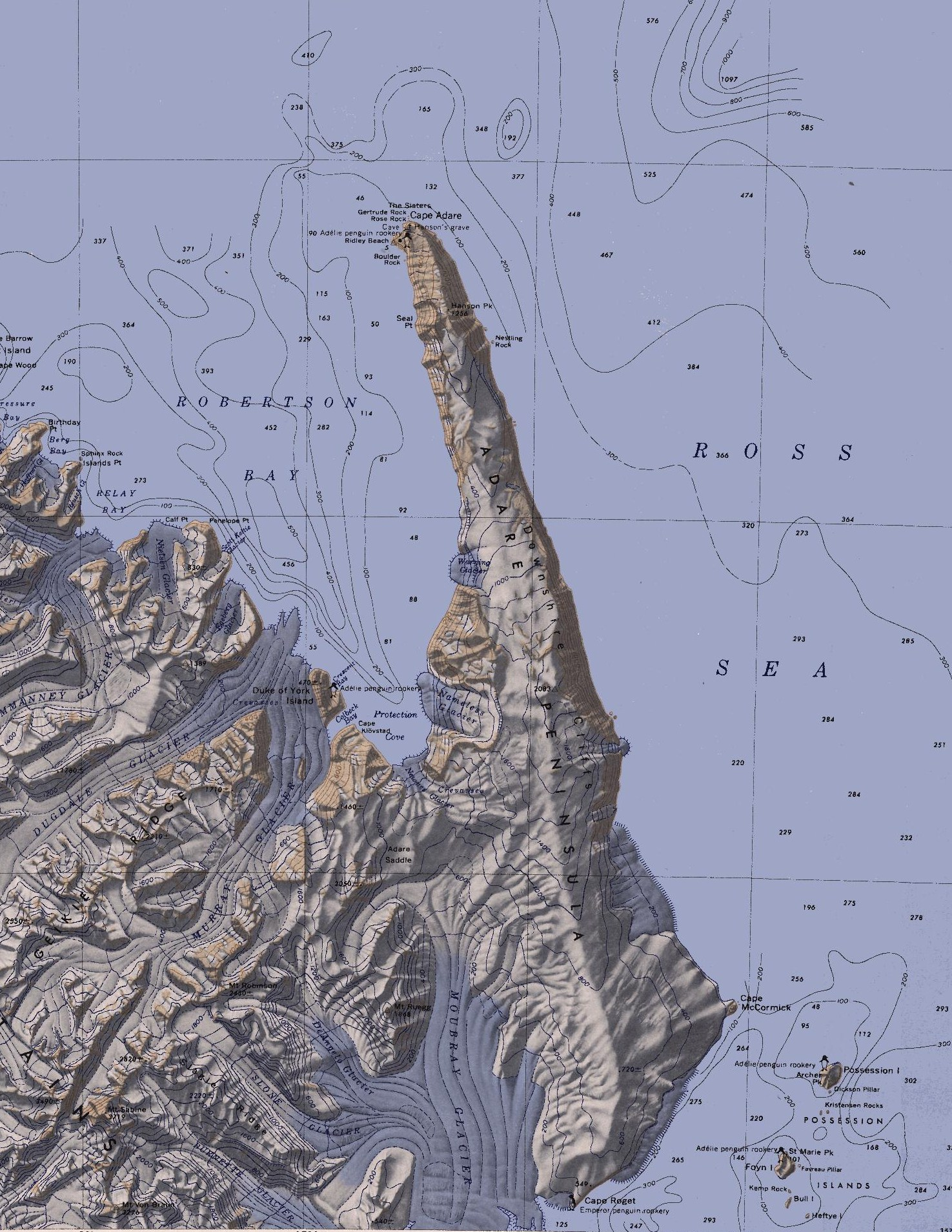
Possession islands to the extreme southeast of map

Named features, from south to north, are:

=== Heftye Island ===
71°59′S 171°06′E. Small island which is the southernmost of the Possession Islands, lying east of the south end of the Adare Peninsula. Named by a Norwegian expedition of 1894-95, led by Bull and Kristensen, for Messrs. Thos, Joh. Heftye and Son of Christiania (now Oslo), shareholders in the expedition ship Antarctic.

=== Bull Island ===
71°59′S 171°06′E. Rocky island between Kemp Rock and Heftye Island. Mapped by United States Geological Survey (USGS) from surveys and United States Navy air photos, 1960–63. Named by United States Advisory Committee on Antarctic Names (US-ACAN) for Henrik Johan Bull who, with Captain Leonard Kristensen, explored this area in 1895 in the ship Antarctic and landed on the Possession Islands.

=== Kemp Rock ===
71°58′S 171°06′E. A large insular rock between Foyn Island and Bull Island. Mapped by USGS from surveys and United States Navy air photos, 1960-63. Named by US-ACAN for William R. Kemp, PHI, United States Navy, Photographer of Squadron VX-6 on the flight of January 18, 1958, at the time the Possession Islands and this feature were photographed.

=== Foyn Island ===
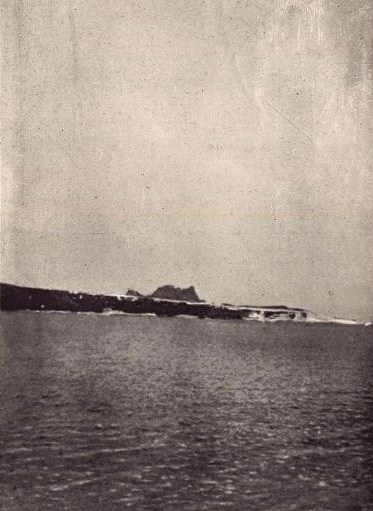
Photography of Foyn Island in 1895, taken by Henrik Bull

71°56′S 171°04′E. The second largest island in the Possession Islands, lying 4 nautical miles (7.4 km; 4.6 mi) southwest of Possession Island. Named by a Norwegian expedition of 1894-95, led by Bull and Kristensen, for Svend Foyn, primary financer of the expedition.

=== St. Marie Peak ===
71°56′S 171°05′E. A small peak, 100 metres (330 ft) high, at the north end of Foyn Island. Mapped by USGS from surveys and United States Navy air photos, 1958-63. Named by US-ACAN for Lieutenant Commander John W. St. Marie, United States Navy, co-pilot on the Squadron VX-6 flight of Jan. 18, 1958, at which time the Possession Islands and this feature were photographed.

=== Favreau Pillar ===
71°57′S 171°07′E. A pillar rock lying close east of Foyn Island. Mapped by USGS from surveys and United States Navy air photos, 1958-63. Named by US-ACAN for TSGT Robert D. Favreau, USMC, Navigator on the United States Navy Squadron VX-6 flight of Jan. 18, 1958, at the time this feature was photographed.

=== Kristensen Rocks ===
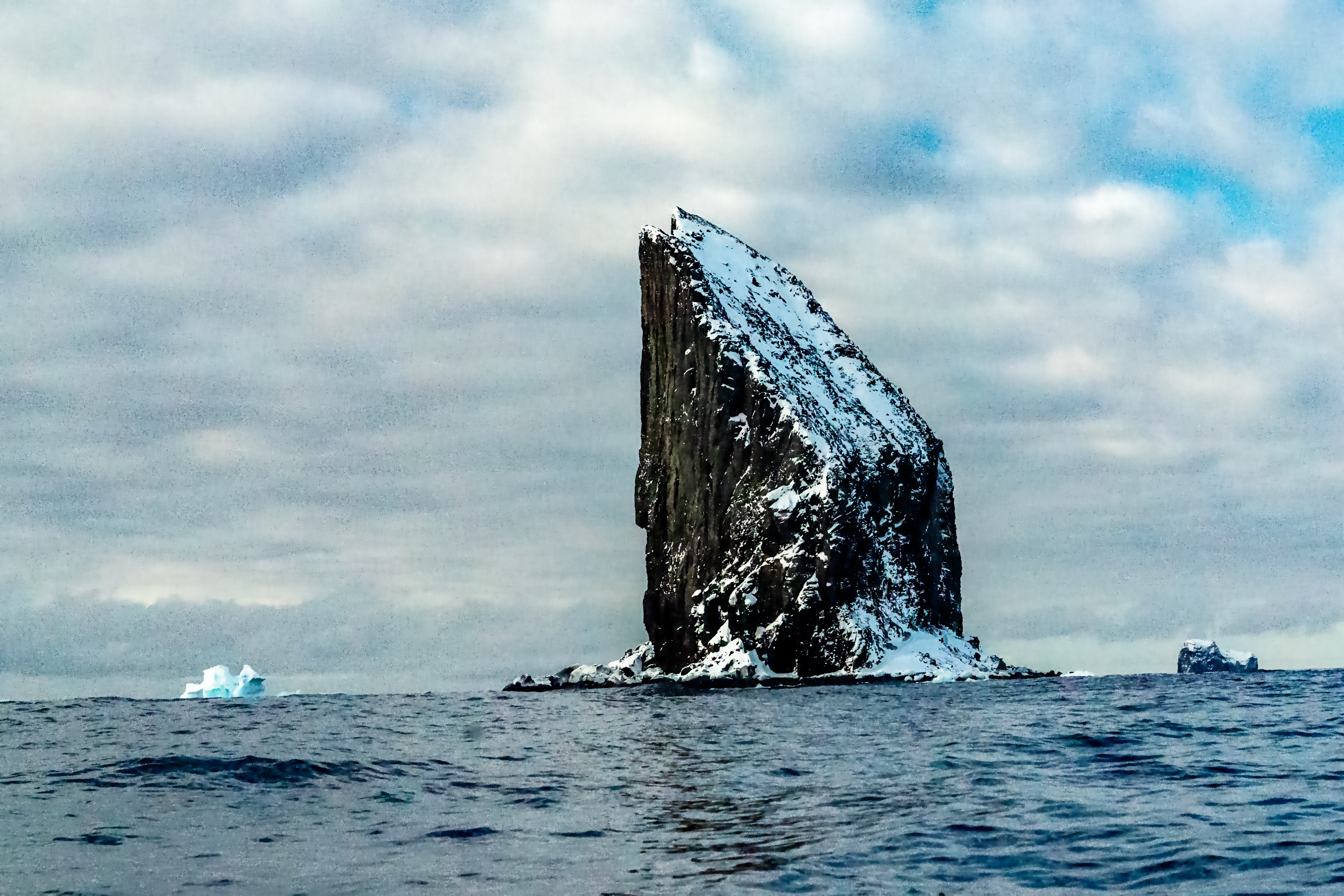
Kristensen Rocks

71°55′S 171°11′E. Twin rocks lying 1 nautical mile (1.9 km; 1.2 mi) south of Possession Island. Mapped by USGS from surveys and United States Navy air photos, 1960-63. Named by US-ACAN for Captain Leonard Kristensen who, with H.J. Bull in the ship Antarctic, explored the area and landed on the Possession Islands in 1895.

=== Dickson Pillar ===
71°54′S 171°11′E. A pillar rock lying close south of Possession Island. Mapped by USGS from surveys and United States Navy air photos, 1958-63. Named by US-ACAN for Paul B. Dickson, PHC, USN, Photographer of Squadron VX-6 on the flight of January 18, 1958, at the time this feature was photographed.

=== Possession Island ===
71°52′S 171°12′E. Rocky island nearly 2 nautical miles (3.7 km; 2.3 mi) long, which is the northernmost and largest of the Possession Islands. Discovered by a British expedition under James Clark Ross, 1839-43, and so named by him in commemoration of the planting of the British flag there on Jan. 12, 1841.

=== Archer Peak ===
71°52′S 171°10′E. Peak, 110 metres (360 ft) high, on the southwest extremity of Possession Island. Named by the British Antarctic Expedition, 1898-1900, presumably for A. Archer, Esq., of Australia, mentioned in the preface to Borchgrevink's "First on the Antarctic Continent", or for Colin Archer who designed Carsten Borchgrevink's vessel, the Southern Cross.

== See also ==
- Composite Antarctic Gazetteer
- List of Antarctic and Subantarctic islands
- List of Antarctic islands south of 60° S
- SCAR
- Territorial claims in Antarctica

== Sources ==
- Alberts, Fred G., ed. (1995), Geographic Names of the Antarctic (PDF) (2 ed.), United States Board on Geographic Names This article incorporates public domain material from websites or documents of the United States Board on Geographic Names.

This article incorporates public domain material from websites or documents of the United States Geological Survey.
