= Antarctic (ship) =

Swedish steamship used for several polar expeditions

Coordinates: 63°50′S 57°00′W

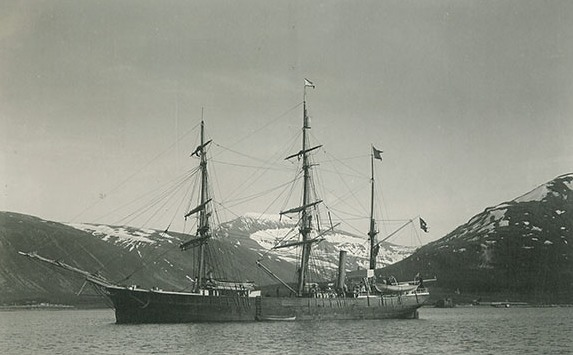
- Antarctic in Tromsø harbor, 1898

History
- Name: Antarctic
- Port of registry: Sweden
- Launched: 1871, in Drammen, Norway
- Fate: Sank 12 February 1903

General characteristics
- Type: Steamship
- Tonnage: 226 netto
- Length: 41.5 m (136 ft)
- Height: 33.5 m (110 ft)
- Propulsion: Sails, 45 hp (34 kW) auxiliary steam engine
- Sail plan: Barque
- Speed: 6 knots (11 km/h)
- Capacity: 346 brutto

Antarctic was a Swedish steamship built in Drammen, Norway, in 1871. She was used on several research expeditions to the Arctic region and to Antarctica from 1893 to 1903. In 1895 the first confirmed landing on the mainland of Antarctica was made from this ship.

== The ship ==
Antarctic was a barque with three masts and equipped with a steam engine, built in 1871 at Holmen in Drammen in Norway under the name Cap Nor.

Initially Antarctic was used for seal hunting around Svalbard, Jan Mayen and Greenland. During that period the ship was captained by Gullik Jensen.

In the early 1890s Norwegian ship-owner Svend Foyn wanted to expand his business to the Antarctic Ocean thereby needing capable ships. Foyn then purchased Cap Nor, made extensive repairs and after completion renamed the ship Antarctic. From 1893 the ship was deployed to the Antarctic Ocean for whale hunting.

In 1897 the ship was purchased by Alfred Gabriel Nathorst for his planned expedition to Svalbard. Again extensive repairs were made prior to the expedition in 1898.

In 1899 Nathorst sold the ship to Georg Carl Amdrup for his expedition to East Greenland.

In 1900 Amdrup sold Antarctic to Otto Nordenskjöld who needed the ship for his Antarctic expedition.

== The expeditions ==
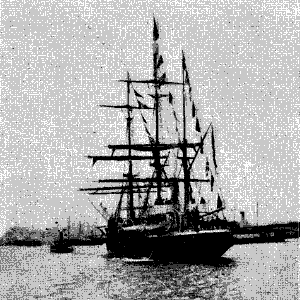
Antarctic leaving Gothenburg harbor, 1901

In 1893 Antarctic captained by Leonard Kristensen set off on a whaling expedition to Antarctica led by Henrik Johan Bull and financed by Foyn. The ship was equipped with 11 harpoon guns, an arsenal of explosives, 8 whaleboats and 31 men and left Tønsberg on September 20, 1893. The first summer was spent around the Kerguelen Islands with winter camp in Melbourne. On September 28, 1894, the ship set off for the Ross Sea.

On January 24, 1895, a boat was put ashore at Cape Adare at the northern extremity of Victoria Land with six men including Bull, Borchgrevink, Kristensen and Tunzelmann. The party performed the first confirmed landing on the continent of Antarctica, exactly who went ashore first was never cleared as all members claimed the honor (possibly British-American sealer John Davis had already made a landing on the Antarctic Peninsula on February 7, 1821; this claim can, however, not be confirmed).

In 1898 Antarctic captained by Emil Nilsson carried Nathorst's polar expedition to Bear Island, Svalbard and Kong Karls Land. Among the participating scientists were Axel Hamberg, Otto Kjellström, Gustaf Kolthoff and Henrik Hesselman.

In 1899 the ship left on an expedition also under the command of Nathorst to North Greenland with the dual purpose of searching for survivors of the 1897 Andrée's Arctic Balloon Expedition and geographical mapping the area.

Later the same year Antarctic carried Amdrup's expedition to East Greenland.

In 1901 the ship, then on loan from Nordenskjöld, carried the second season of the Swedish-Russian Arc-of-Meridian Expedition under the command of Gerard De Geer to Svalbard.

On October 16, 1901 Antarctic now captained by Carl Anton Larsen left Gothenburg harbor on Nordenskjold's Antarctic expedition. This would become the ship's last voyage.

== The ship wrecking ==
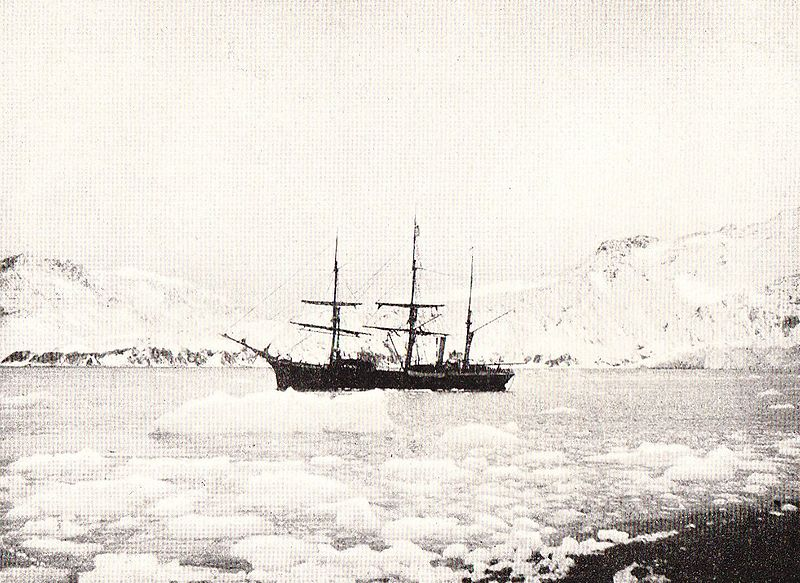
Antarctic trapped in pack ice

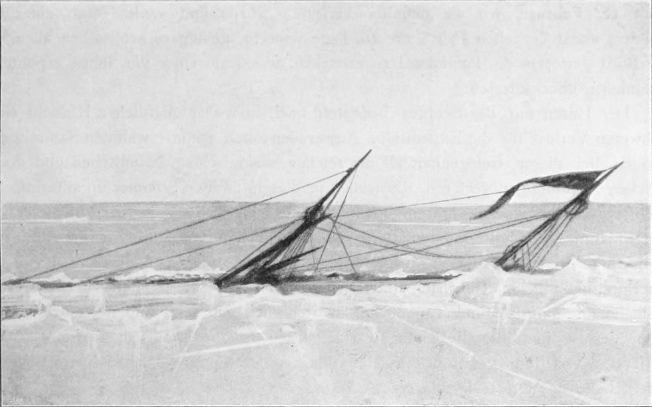
Antarctic sinking

After exploring parts of the South Shetland Islands the expedition continued through the Antarctic Sound towards the Antarctic Peninsula. On January 15, 1902 Hope Bay was discovered. In February Nordenskjöld chose Snow Hill Island as winter camp for part of the expedition. After all preparations were completed Antarctic left for the Falkland Islands.

After the winter the ship left the Falklands on November 5 heading back to the Antarctic Peninsula by way of Ushuaia for supplies. On December 29 Antarctic was trapped in pack ice near Hope Bay, and some of the crew was put ashore.

Antarctic later broke free and continued towards Paulet Island; on the way the ship once again was trapped in pack ice on January 3, 1903. On February 3 the ship again broke free but was now damaged and leaking. Captain Larsen now intended to beach Antarctic on Paulet Island, but the ship was too damaged and sank about 40 km (25 mi) off the coast on February 12, 1903.

In November all crewmembers (including Carl Skottsberg, Johan Gunnar Andersson, José María Sobral and Frank Wilbert Stokes) were rescued by the Argentine corvette Uruguay captained by Julián Irízar.

== Epitaph ==
When Nathorst heard about the ship wrecking he commented "seems to me more glorious than if she had gone to meet the usual fate of vessels to slowly rot in some port, or to be used for something far off from her designation and purposes as an icy seas and research vessel".

In 1944 Johan Gunnar Andersson published a commemorative book Antarctic :Stolt har hon levat Stolt skall hon dö – Antarctic: proud she lived proud she shall die.

The Antarctic Sound, Antarctic Bay (Greenland) and Antarctic Haven in Greenland, Antarcticberget in Jan Mayen as well as Antarctic Bay in South Georgia and the Antarctic Sound in Antarctica, were named after the ship.

== See also ==
- List of Antarctic exploration ships from the Heroic Age, 1897–1922
