= Kvasstinden =

Mountain in Nordland, Norway

- Interactive map of the mountain

Highest point
- Elevation: 705 m (2,313 ft)
- Prominence: 705 m (2,313 ft)
- Coordinates: 68.9302°N 15.4827°E

Geography
- Location: Nordland, Norway

Kvasstinden is the highest mountain on the island of Andøya in the Vesterålen archipelago in northern Norway. It is located in the southern part of Andøy Municipality in Nordland county. The mountain is 705 metres (2,313 ft) tall.
