= Bleik =

Village in Andøy Municipality, Norway

- Village
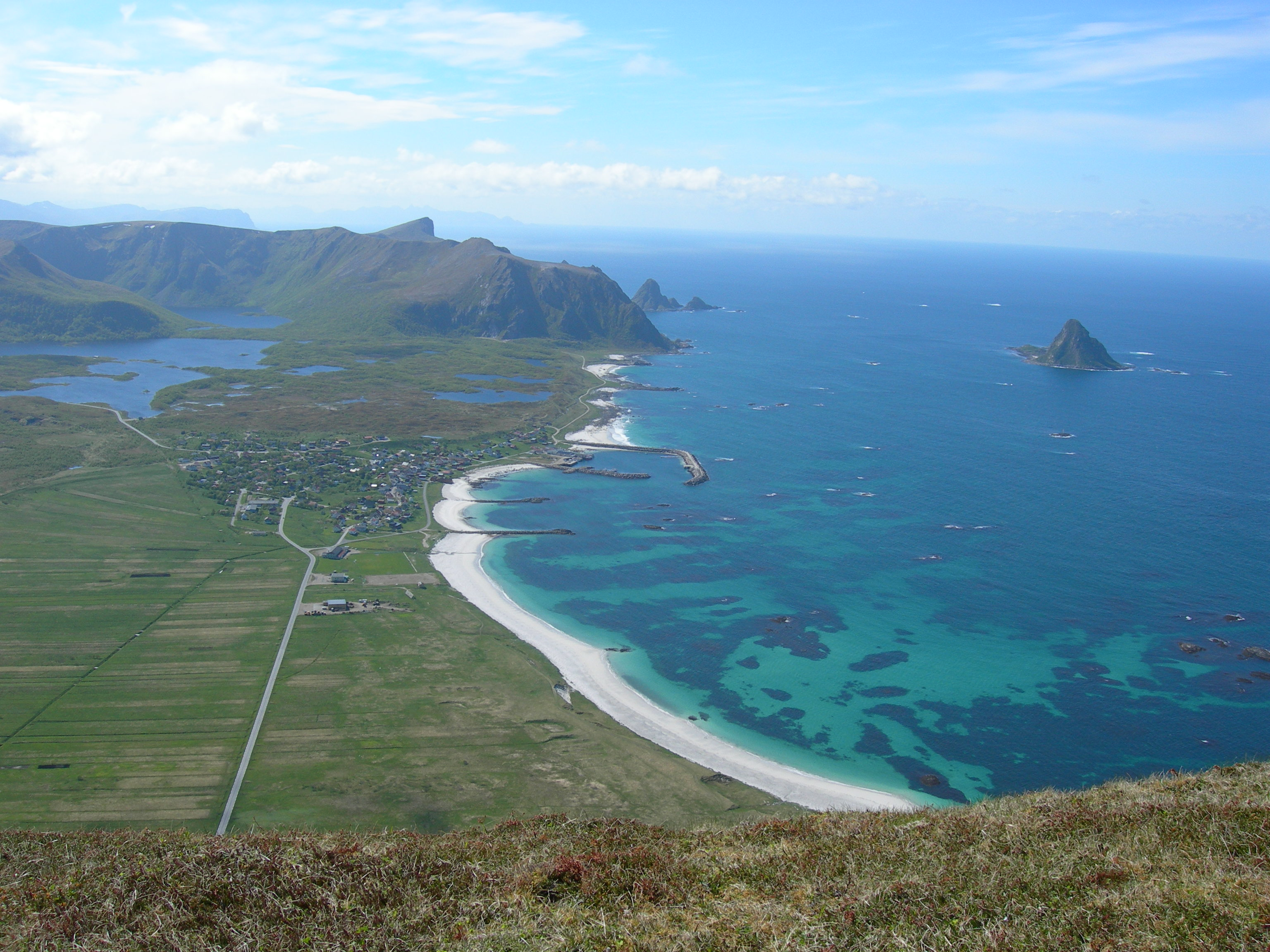
- View Bleik seen from Mount Røyken
- Interactive map of Bleik
- Location within Nordland Location within Norway
- Coordinates: 69.2726°N 15.9554°E
- Country: Norway
- Region: Northern Norway
- County: Nordland
- District: Vesterålen
- Municipality: Andøy Municipality

Area
  - Total: 0.38 km^{2} (0.15 sq mi)
- Elevation: 7 m (23 ft)

Population (2023)
  - Total: 456
  - Density: 1,200/km^{2} (3,100/sq mi)
- Time zone: UTC+01:00 (CET)
  - Summer (DST): UTC+02:00 (CEST)
- Post Code: 8481 Bleik

Bleik is a fishing village in Andøy Municipality in Nordland county, Norway.The village is located on the northwestern part of the island of Andøya, about 10 kilometres (6.2 mi) southwest of the village of Andenes.

The 0.38-square-kilometre (94-acre) village has a population (2023) of 456 and a population density of 1,200 inhabitants per square kilometre (3,100/sq mi).

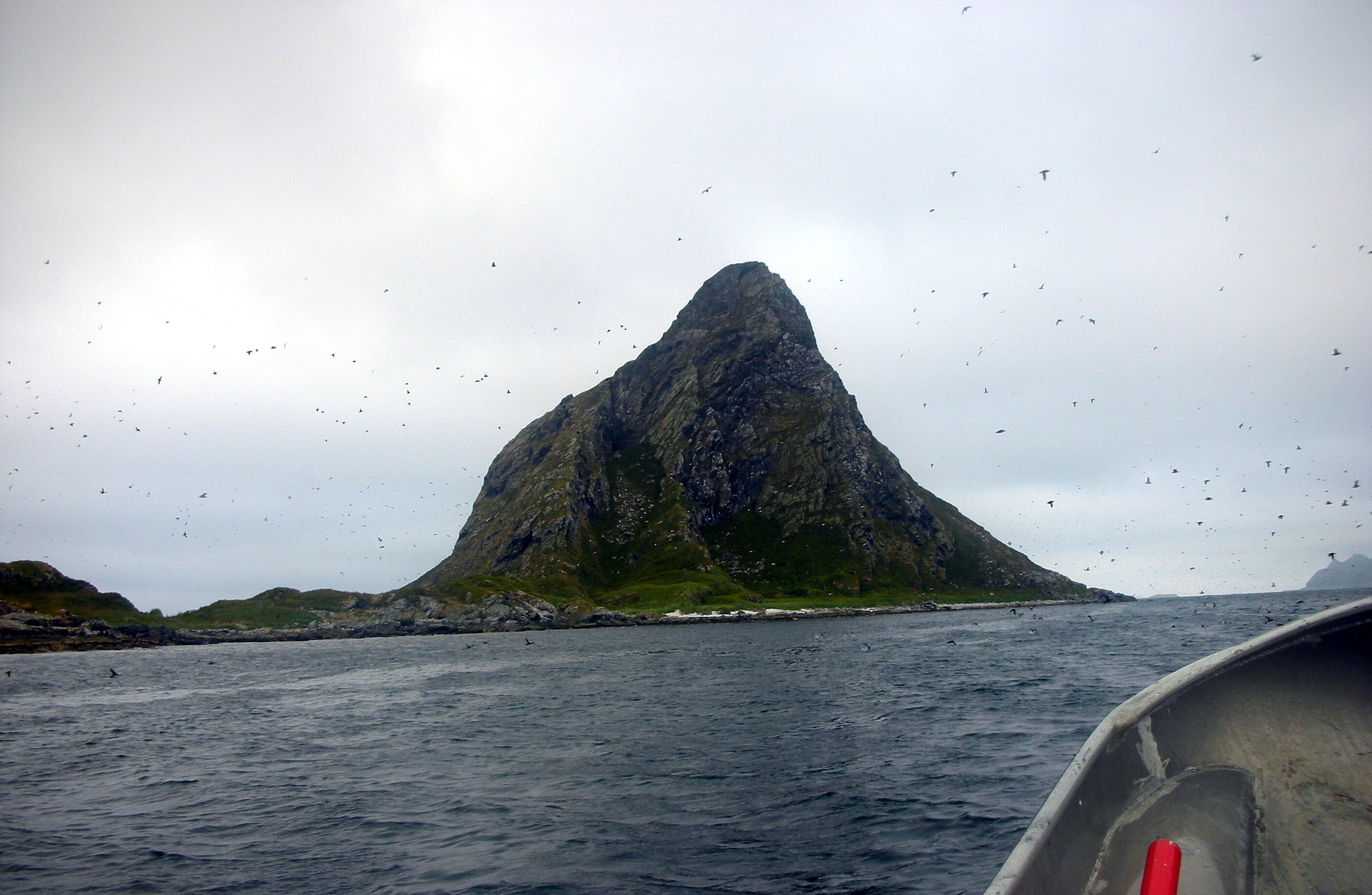
Bleiksøya Island Nature Reserve with its sea bird colony.

The triangle-shaped island off the coast is called Bleiksøya. This island is the biggest resort of puffins in all of Norway. The lake Bleiksvatnet lies just south of the village.

Bleik has one of the longest beaches in Norway, and it is said that the beach is the reason for the village's name. The beach is white, and bleik is a word for white/pale in the Norwegian language. In the village, there is a horse barn, an elementary school, and a grocery store. Tourist information, puffin safari, campsite and a local pub are also present.

Bleik is also known for naming the Bleik Canyon, which starts about 15 kilometres (9.3 mi) offshore from the beach of Bleik in the Norwegian Sea. Bleik Canyon is a very deep canyon with depths up to 3,000 metres (9,800 ft) and is the residence of whales and giant squid. It is a popular hotspot for whale safaris because of the presence of sperm whales.

== Notable residents ==
- Lasse Nilsen, a footballer for Tromsø IL
