= Henrik Johan Bull =

Norwegian polar explorer (1844–1930)

Henrik Johan Bull (13 October 1844 – 1 June 1930) was a Norwegian businessman and whaler. Henry Bull was one of the pioneers in the exploration of Antarctica.

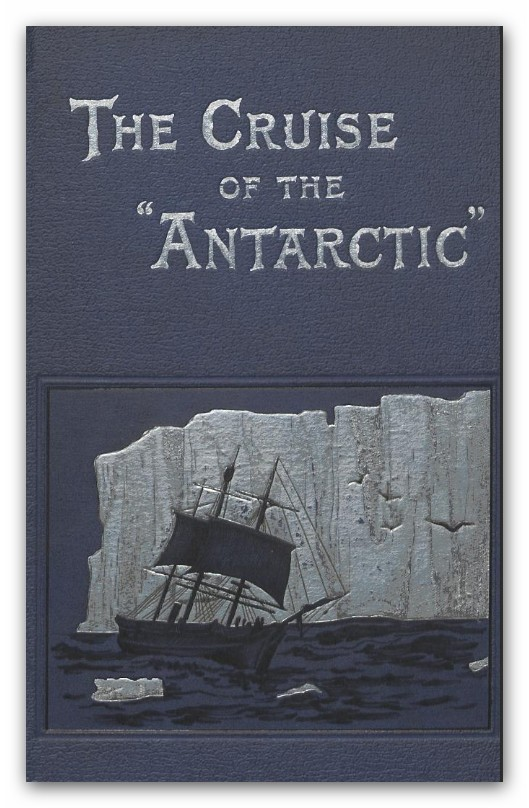
The Cruise of the 'Antarctic' (London & New York: Edward Arnold, 1896)

He was born at Stokke in Vestfold County, Norway. Bull attended school in Tønsberg and worked for several years as a businessman in Tønsberg. He had squandered the family fortunes through his excessively social lifestyle. At the end of 1886, he traveled to Melbourne, Australia to try and restore the family fortunes. Initially he was reduced to labouring in the timber industry. Finally in 1891 he obtained a position at Trapp, Blair and Co, Melbourne shipping agents and with the support of his employer was able to pursue his dream of an Antarctic whaling and sealing expedition.

In 1893, Norwegian whaling and shipping magnate Svend Foyn agreed to financially support an Antarctica expedition led by Henrik Bull in search of the elusive Right whale. Svend Foyn was a businessman who patented the grenade-harpoon gun which was to be used for whaling.

The ship provided by Svend Foyn was the Antarctic, a three masts barque equipped with a steam engine. It was also equipped with eleven harpoon guns, an arsenal of explosives, eight whaleboats and a thirty-one man crew. The ship was captained by Leonard Kristensen (1857–1911). The crew included Carsten Borchgrevink, who later lead the Southern Cross Expedition to Antarctica. Over the course of the two-year expedition, they visited Tristan da Cunha, the Prince Edward Islands, Îles Crozet, Îles Kerguelen, the Balleny Islands, Campbell Island and Possession Islands. On 19 January 1895, a small party landed on Possession Island, a rocky island about 2 miles long. On 24 January 1895, a boat was put ashore with six men including Bull, Leonard Kristensen, Carsten Borchgrevink and seaman Alexander von Tunzelmann at Cape Adare, Antarctica. At the time they believed they were the first men to set foot on Antarctica – and they are certainly the best confirmed – but unknown to them sealer John Davis, had made a disputed claim that he stepped onto the Antarctic Peninsula much earlier in 1821.

In 1898, Henrik Johan Bull wrote his memories of the expedition in his book, Sydover. Ekspeditionen til Sydishavet i 1893–1895. The book was also published in English under the title The cruise of the 'Antarctic' to the South Polar regions (London & New York: Edward Arnold, 1896).

In 1903 Henrik Bull became a citizen of the new Commonwealth of Australia. After that he mainly resided in Norway, so it is likely his citizenship was primarily to facilitate his Antarctic ambitions as an Australian (and therefore British) citizen

Henrik Bull didn’t give up on his dream of establishing an Antarctic whale and seal industry. In 1906 he managed to raise funds for a sealing voyage to the Crozet Islands. The ship Cathrine was caught in a fierce storm in American Bay, on the east coast of Possession Island, and was wrecked. Bull and the crew were rescued and taken to Australia. He was able to renew old acquaintances in Melbourne. Not one to give up, Bull, with the support of his son Ole’s company, Storm, Bull and Co. managed another expedition to the sub-Antarctic aboard the ship Solglimt. This was a successful voyage. In 1908 Solglimt set out again for Marion Island. This time Bull did not join the voyage, but again disaster struck when Solglimt hit an unmarked reef and had to be run to the beach. Again all the crew were saved.

Later that year Bull and his son’s company embarked on an even more ambitious plan, establishing a whaling station and processing factory on the Kerguelen Islands. While they took a reasonable numbers of seals, the whaling was disappointing. They moved operations to German South West Africa (now Namibia). 1914 looked like a better year for the company, but the First World War caused a cessation of operations. When the war was over the company didn’t have the capital to re-establish itself and was sold By then Bull was in his mid-70s and finally retired from his attempts of establishing an Antarctic whaling and sealing empire.

Bull died in Oslo, Norway at 85 years of age.

== Other sources ==
- Per Gramsborg. "The first man to have set foot on the Antarctic continent". I: The Norseman, nr 2 (1992)
- Norsk biografisk leksikon
- Henrik Johan Bull (1898) Sydover. Ekspeditionen til Sydishavet i 1893–1895 (British Library, Historical Print Editions) ISBN 978-1-241-41827-4
- Andrew McConville (2022) In Search of the Last Continent: Australia and Early Antarctic Exploration (Australian Scholarly Publishing) ISBN 9781922669940
- Odd Galteland (2013) A/S Kerguelen 1908-1912: the optimism, the dreams - and the dull working day (Sandefjord: Vestfoldmuseene IKS) ISBN 9788299059503
