= Cape Adare =

Peninsula of East Antarctica

- Coordinates: 71°17′S 170°14′E
- Location: Antarctica

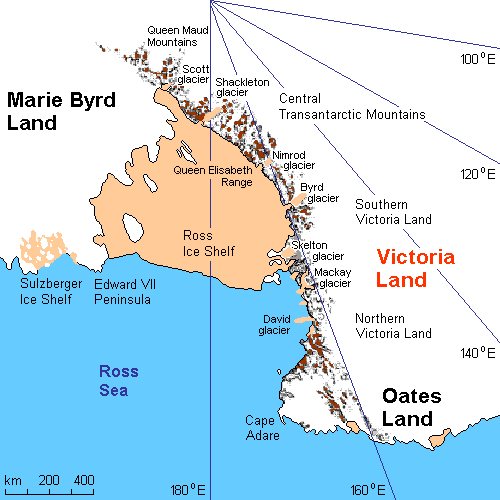
Area map of Cape Adare

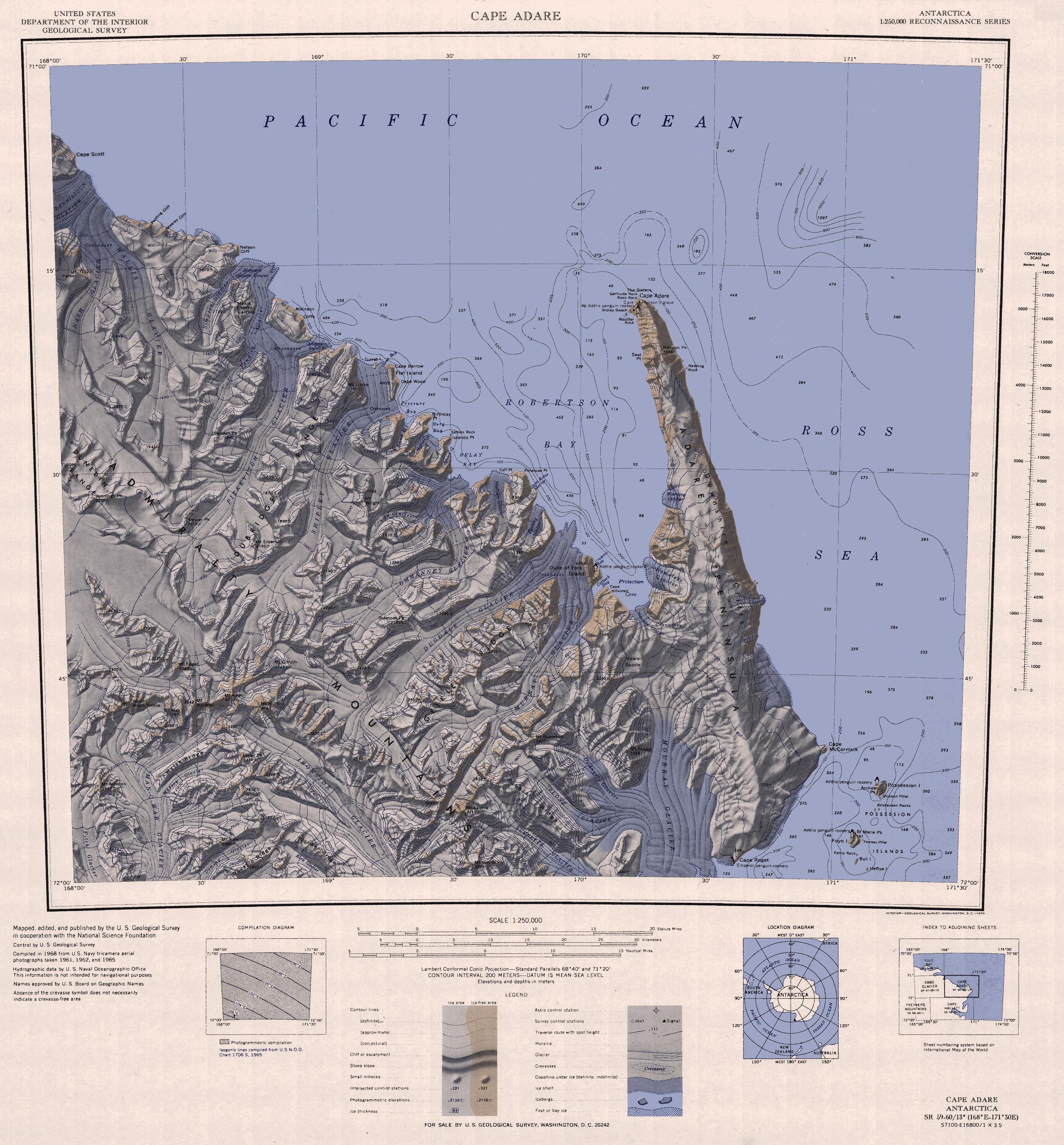
Topographic map of the Cape Adare region

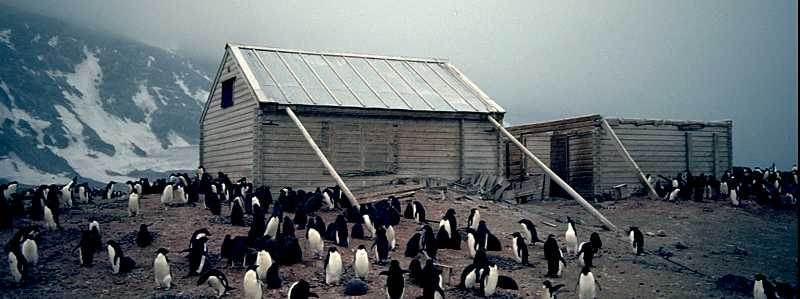
Borchgrevink's 1899 hut (HSM 22) surrounded by penguins

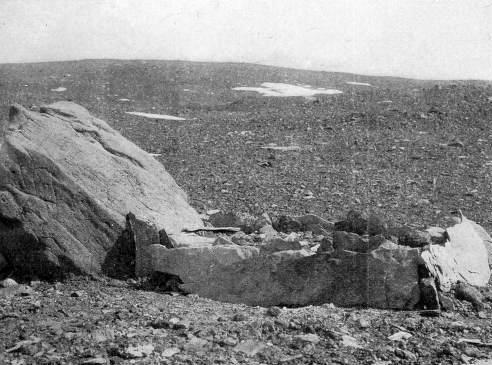
Nicolai Hanson's grave (HSM 23) – 1899 photograph

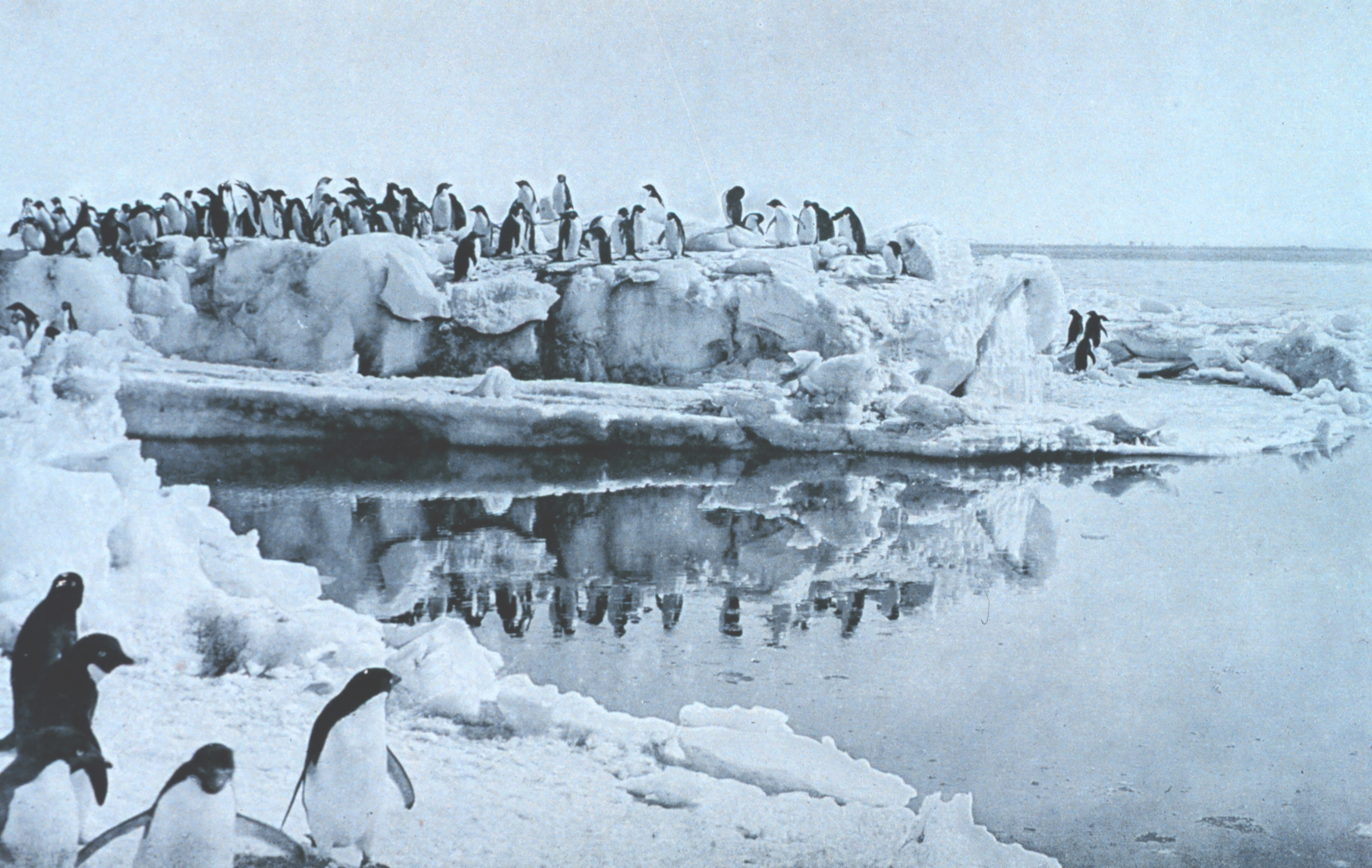
Adélie penguins on an ice foot at Cape Adare – photo by George Murray Levick, 1911 or 1912

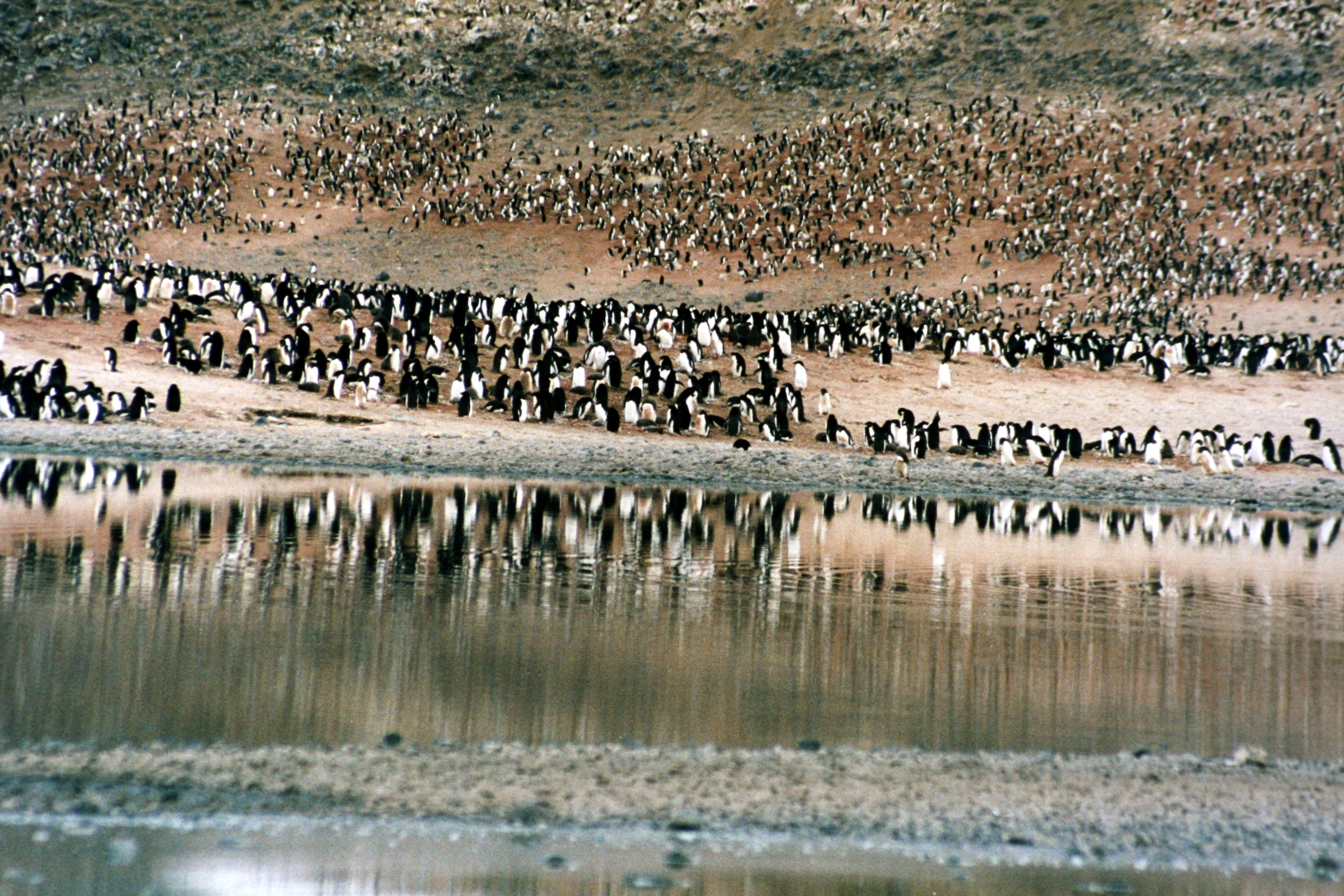
Adélie penguins at Cape Adare

Cape Adare is a prominent cape of black basalt forming the northern tip of the Adare Peninsula and the north-easternmost extremity of Victoria Land, East Antarctica.

It is the site of the first confirmed landing on the Antarctic mainland—undertaken from Antarctic in 1895—and the first base on the Antarctic mainland—established by Southern Cross in 1899. On both occasions an important role was played by Carstens Borchgrevink.

== Description ==
Marking the north end of Borchgrevink Coast and the west end of Pennell Coast, the cape separates the Ross Sea to the east from the Southern Ocean to the west, and is backed by the high Admiralty Mountains. Cape Adare was an important landing site and base camp during early Antarctic exploration. Off the coast to the northeast are the Adare Seamounts and the Adare Trough.

== History ==
Captain James Ross discovered Cape Adare in January 1841 and named it after his friend Viscount Adare (the title is derived from Adare in County Limerick in Ireland; Lord Adare later became, in 1850, the 3rd Earl of Dunraven and Mount-Earl).

In January 1895, Norwegian explorers Henrik Bull and Carsten Borchgrevink from the ship Antarctic landed at Cape Adare as the first documented landing on Antarctica, collecting geological specimens. Borchgrevink returned to the cape leading his own expedition in 1899 and erected two huts, the first human structures built in Antarctica. The expedition members overwintered and the survivors were picked up in January 1900. This was the first expedition party ever to winter over on the Antarctic continent. Zoologist Nicolai Hanson died during the winter and was buried at Cape Adare.

The closest research station in modern times was Hallett Station, the joint New Zealand/United States station at Cape Hallett, 63 miles (101 km) to the south. This base was in use from 1957 to 1973.

The Australian Bicentennial Antarctic Expedition set out from Cape Adare for their successful assault on Mount Minto in 1988. The expedition's support vessel was moored to the ice shelf in the bay and maintained radio contact with the climbers during their ascent.

In February 2007, the Japanese whaling ship Nisshin Maru experienced a fire below decks while in the Ross Sea. The vessel drifted without power for days until its engines were repaired, raising concern among New Zealand authorities due to its proximity to the world's largest Adélie penguin rookery at Cape Adare.

=== Historic sites and monuments ===
The first buildings erected by Carsten Borchgrevink at Cape Adare were prefabricated of pine by the Norwegian factory Strømmen Trævarefabrikk. These huts are still standing, and the site is recognized internationally as a significant historic site. Members of the Northern Party of Scott's Terra Nova Expedition over-wintered at Cape Adare in 1911 and 1912. They erected one hut, which has fallen into ruin today.

As a result of initiatives by the Antarctic Heritage Trust the site (with the buildings) is registered in the Antarctic Treaty System as an Antarctic Specially Protected Area (ASPA 159) the highest level of protection available under the terms of the Treaty.

The remains of two Borchgrevink's Hut, as well as those of the Terra Nova Expedition's hut, have also been designated a Historic Site or Monument (HSM 22), following a proposal by New Zealand and the United Kingdom to the Antarctic Treaty Consultative Meeting. The grave of Nicolai Hanson has been similarly but separately designated (HSM 23).

== Climate ==
Studies suggests that Cape Adare was covered in ice during the Last glacial period, and deglaciated around 16.2 thousand years ago. And the results suggest that it took several thousand years until penguin colonies formed, after ice free surfaces became available.

== Iceberg interactions ==
Submarine shoals on the narrow continental shelf to the east of Cape Adare are the site of unusually frequent submarine collisions with large current-mobilized icebergs transiting northward out of the Ross Sea. Notably, this process led to the sudden breakup of Iceberg B15 in October 2007, as well as a number of other large icebergs. These collisions are energetic enough to be recorded by seismographs in Antarctica and the southern Pacific Ocean region.

== Adélie penguins ==
Cape Adare is the site of the largest Adélie penguin rookery in the world. The only study of this particular colony was done by George Murray Levick, who was a member of the 1910–13 Scott Antarctic Expedition and observed it for an entire breeding cycle in 1911 and 1912. He was reluctant to publish it due to the unusual mating habits of penguins that he recorded, among them homosexuality, sexual and physical abuse of chicks, and mating with dead female penguins, nowadays ascribed to the lack of experience of young penguins. He described it as "depraved". The report was considered too shocking for public release at the time, and was suppressed. The only copies that were made available privately to researchers were translated into Greek, to prevent this knowledge becoming more widely known. After it became lost, it was rediscovered and published in the journal Polar Record only in 2012. The discovery significantly illuminates the behaviour of the species that some researchers believe to be an indicator of climate change.

=== Important Bird Area ===
Over four seasons, sampled between 1981 and 2012, the Adélie colony at Cape Adare had a mean count of 227,000 breeding pairs, making it (along with that at Cape Crozier) among the largest in the Ross Sea. It occupies Ridley Beach and part of the western slopes of the Cape Adare peninsula. A 294 ha site encompassing the colony has been designated an Important Bird Area by BirdLife International. A colony of about 300 pairs of south polar skuas is also present.

In 1901, Carsten Borchgrevink, part of the British Antarctic Expedition 1898–1900, published the book, ‘First on the Antarctic continent’. He wrote ca. 1900, in the chapter dedicated to Adélie penguins:

We all watched the life of the penguins with the utmost interest, and I believe and hope that some of us learnt something from their habits and characteristics.

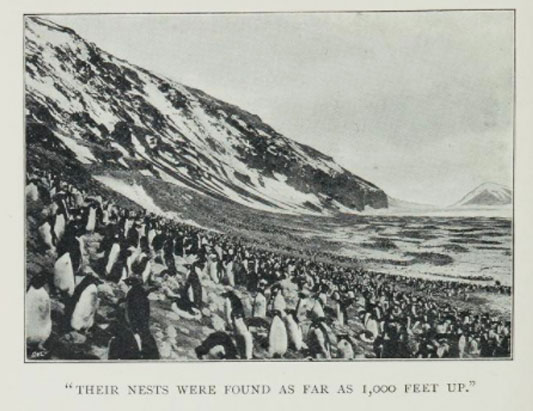

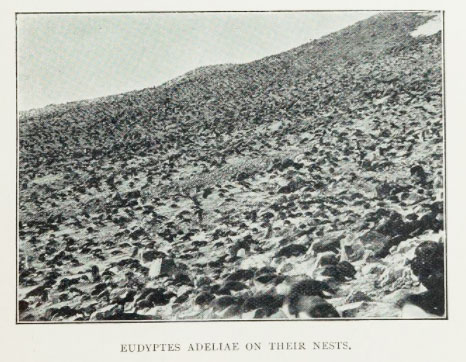
Adélie penguin colony, at their nests

== See also ==
- Gertrude Rock
