= Andøya =

Island in Nordland, Norway

Andøya (Norwegian); Ánda (Northern Sami); Ánddasuolu (Northern Sami)
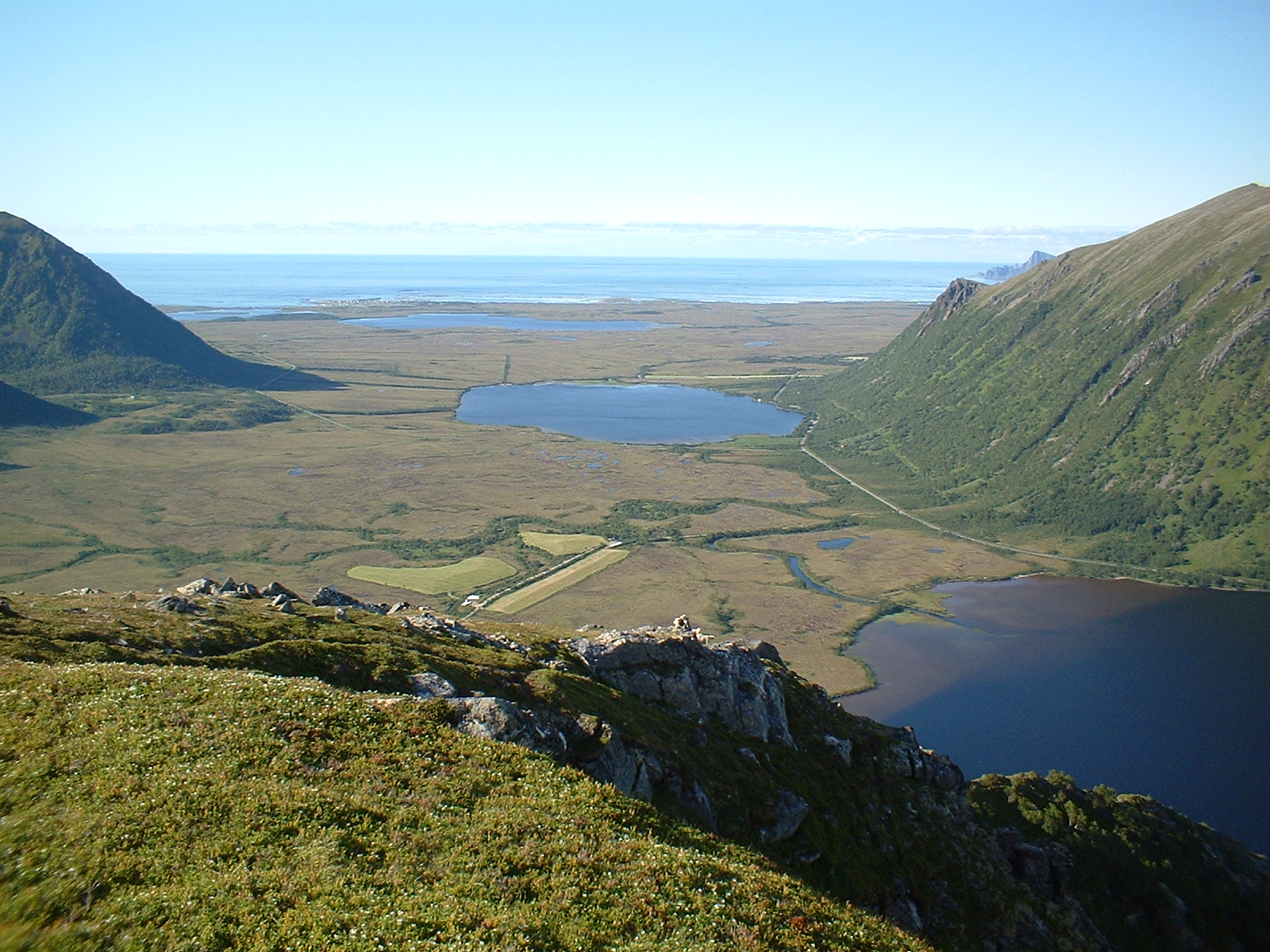
- View of the mountains and bogs of Andøya
- Interactive map of: Andøya (Norwegian); Ánda (Northern Sami); Ánddasuolu (Northern Sami)

Geography
- Location: Nordland, Norway
- Coordinates: 69.1678°N 15.8845°E
- Archipelago: Vesterålen
- Area: 489 km^{2} (189 sq mi)
- Area rank: #10 in Norway
- Length: 57 km (35.4 mi)
- Width: 15 km (9.3 mi)
- Highest elevation: 705 m (2313 ft)
- Highest point: Kvasstinden

Administration
- Norway
- County: Nordland
- Municipality: Andøy Municipality

Andøya (Norwegian), Ánda (Northern Sami), or Ánddasuolu (Northern Sami) is the northernmost island in the Vesterålen archipelago, situated about 300 kilometres (190 mi) inside the Arctic Circle. Andøya is located in Andøy Municipality in Nordland county, Norway. The main population centres on the island include the villages of Andenes, Bleik, and Risøyhamn.

The island has an area of 489 square kilometres (189 sq mi), making it the tenth largest island in Norway. The island is connected to the neighboring island of Hinnøya via the Andøy Bridge. The Andfjorden lies to the east of the island, the Risøysundet strait lies to the south and east side of the island, and the Gavlfjorden lies to the southwest side. The Norwegian Sea lies to the west and north.

The numerous bog areas on Andøya are used for the extensive production of peat. Andøya is also well known for its cloudberries. Besides the flat and largely continuous bog areas, Andøya also consists of steep mountain ranges reaching up to 700 metres (2,300 ft) high. The sharp peak of Kvasstinden is the highest point on the island at 705 metres (2,313 ft). Andøya Space, which was founded in 1962, is also located on the island near the Andøya Air Station.

== Important Bird Area ==
A 10,000-hectare (25,000-acre) area comprising low-lying boggy ground in central Andøya, along with a stretch of the eastern coast and the lake of Skogvollvatnet on the west coast, has been designated an Important Bird Area (IBA) by BirdLife International (BLI) because it supports several thousand barnacle and pinkfooted geese on passage migration, as well as about ten breeding pairs of Eurasian curlews. Protected areas within or overlapping the site include the Skogvoll, Risøysundet, and Åholmen nature reserves and the Skogvoll and Risøysundet Ramsar sites.

== Media gallery ==
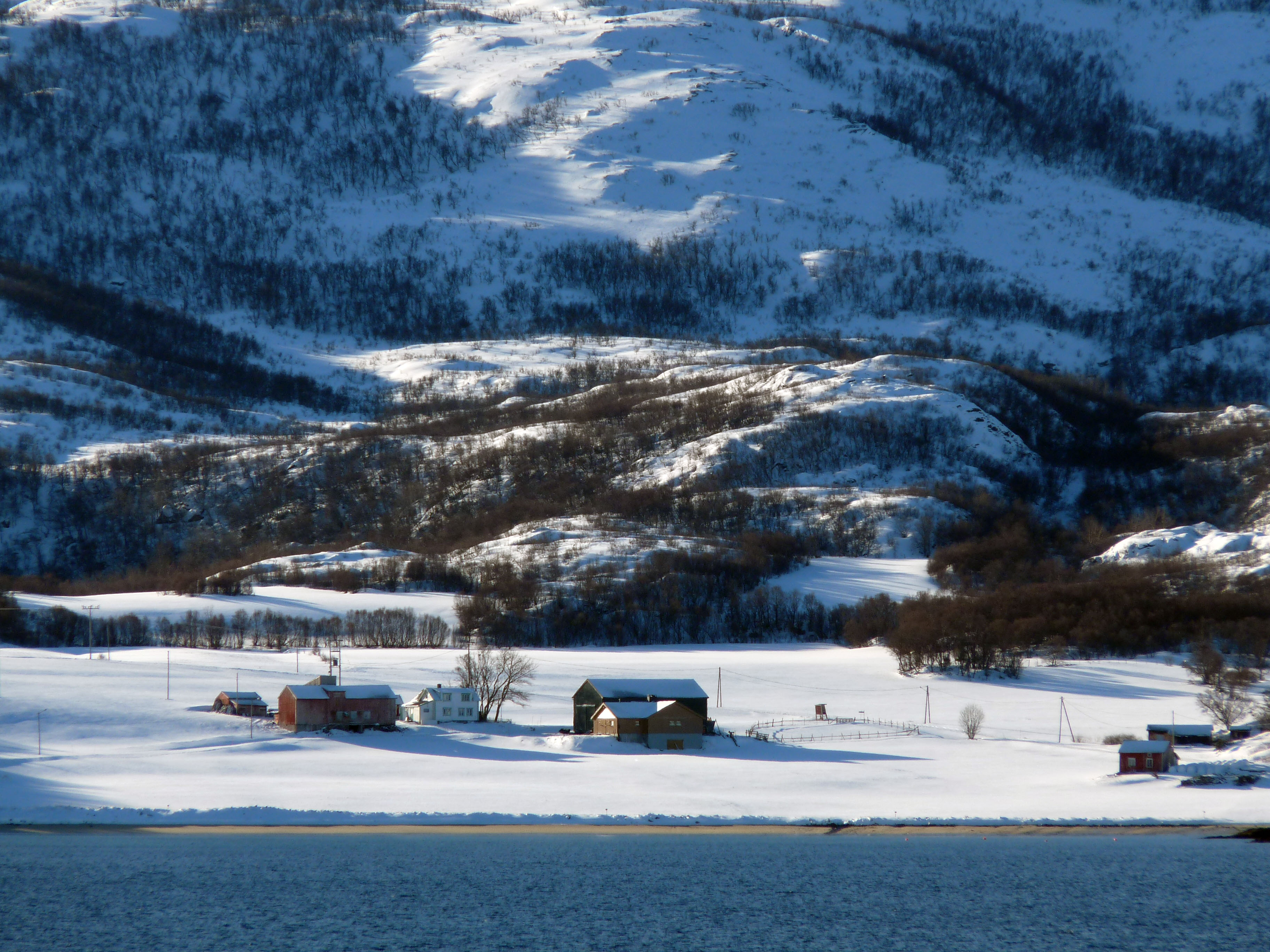
Winter view near Risøyhamn

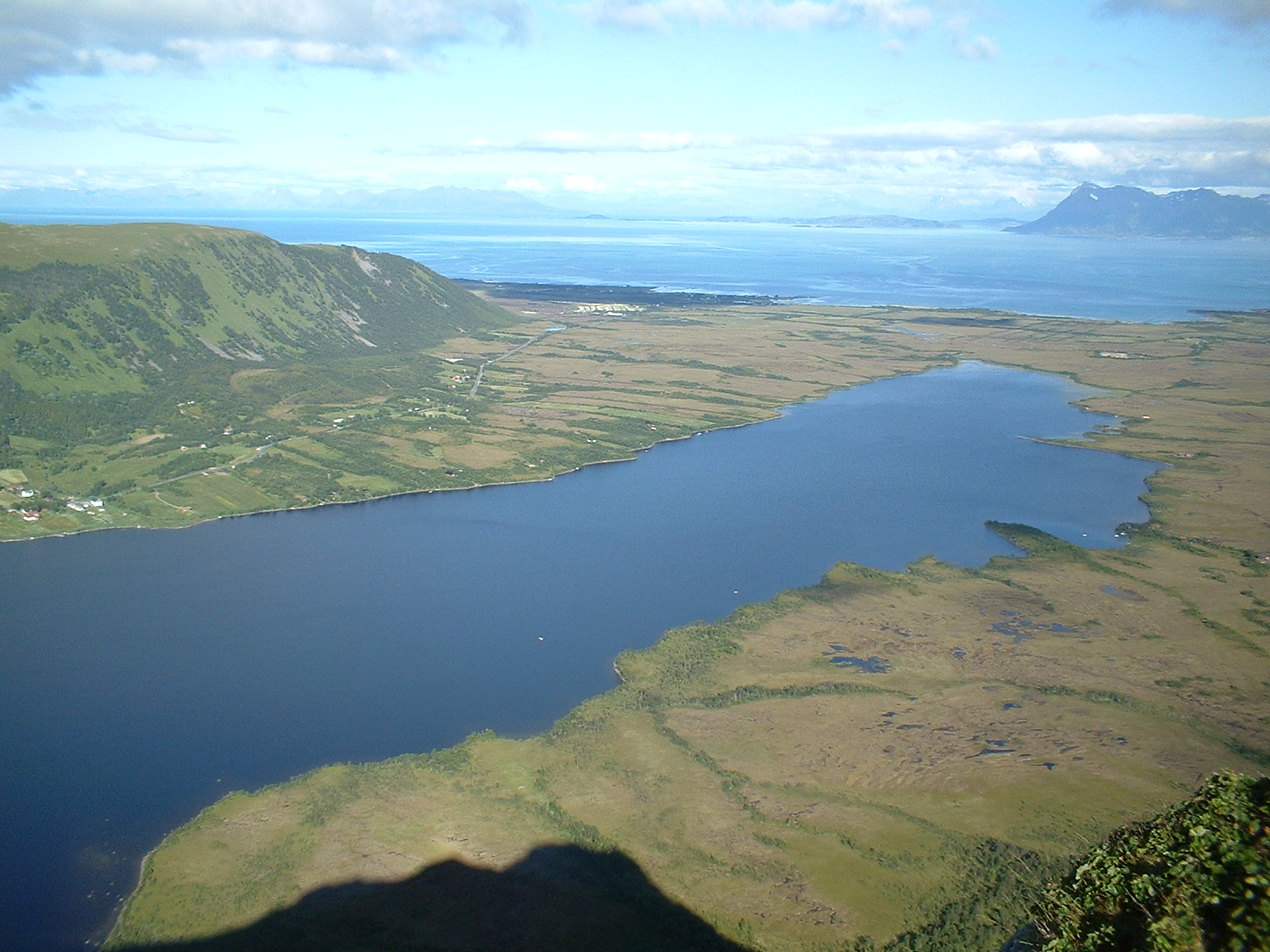
View of Ånes and Å (closest to the sea)

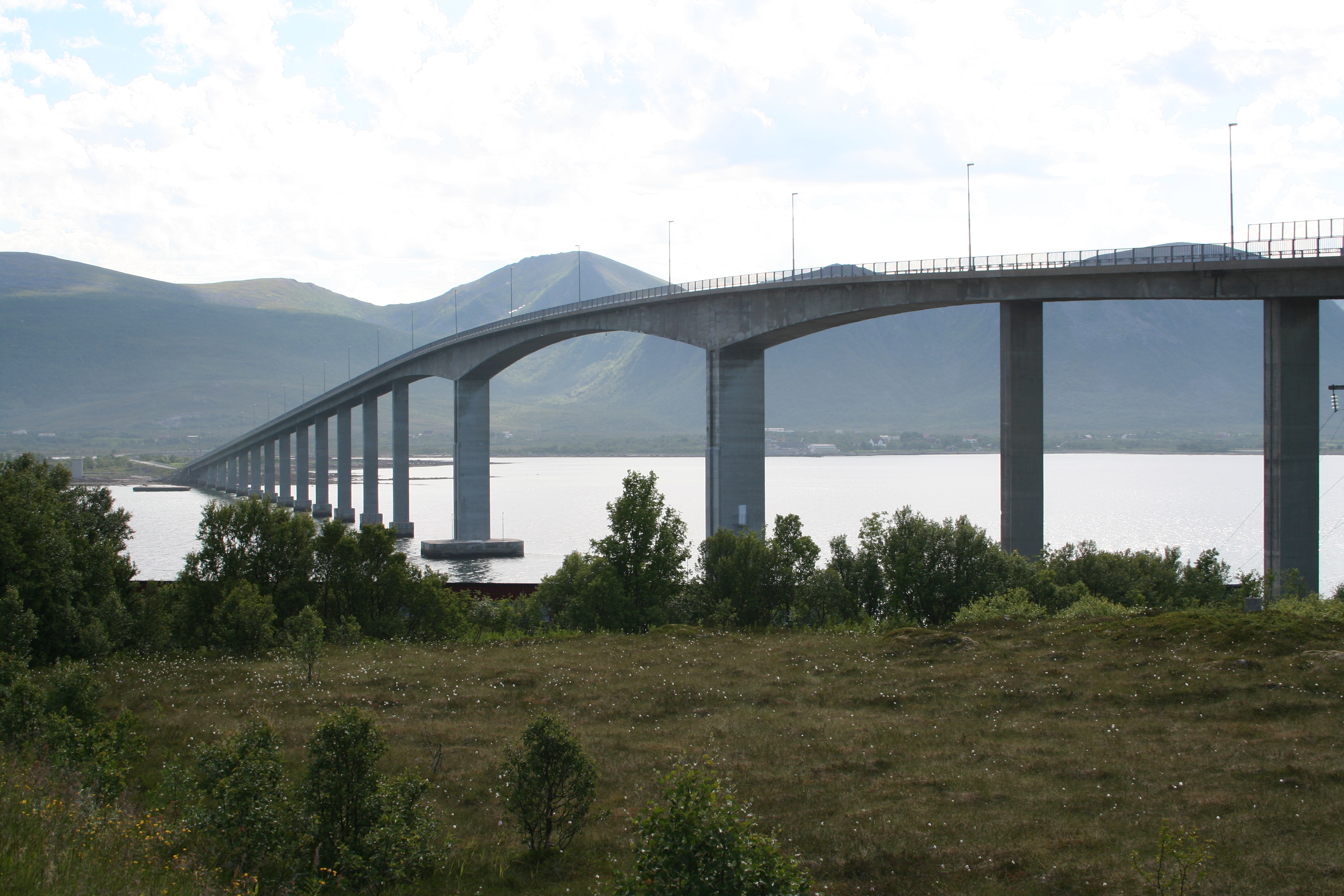
Andøy Bridge linking Andøya to Hinnøya island

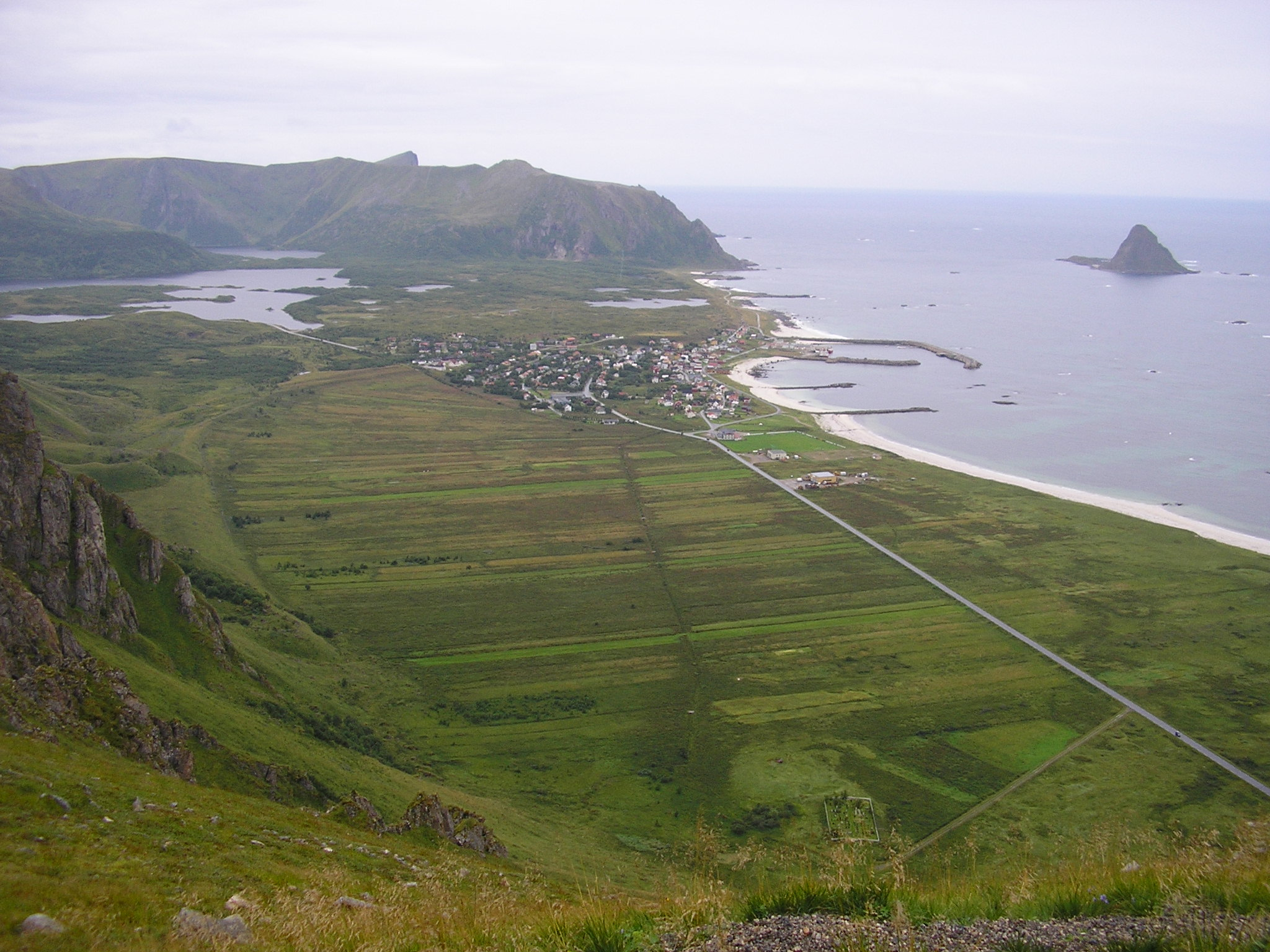
View of Bleik
