= Adare Peninsula =

Mountain in Ross Dependency, Antarctica

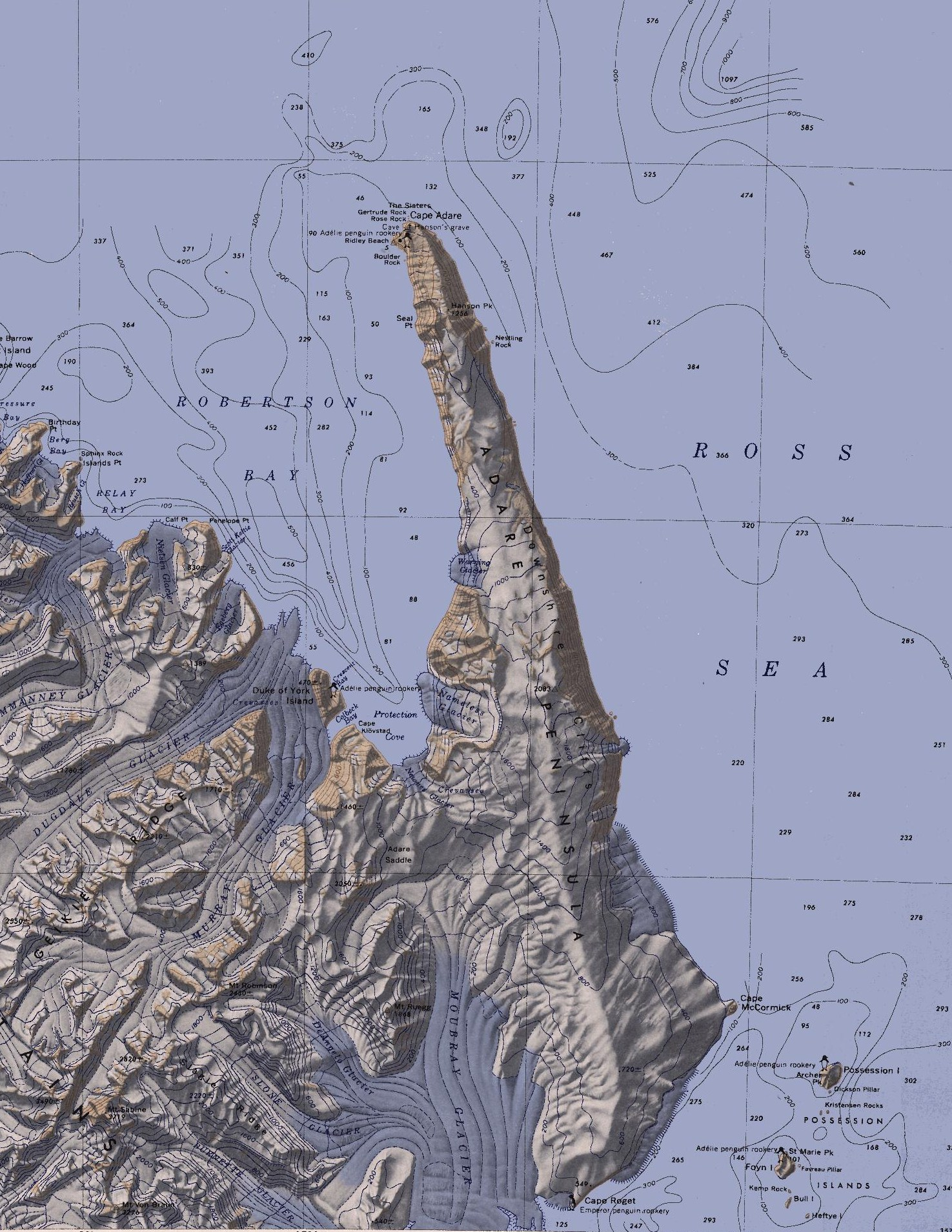
- Adare Peninsula

Highest point
- Coordinates: 71°40′S 170°30′E

Geography
- Location within Antarctica
- Location: Victoria Land, Antarctica

Geology
- Mountain type: Shield volcanoes

The Adare Peninsula (71°40′S 170°30′E), is a high ice-covered peninsula, 40 nautical miles (74 km; 46 mi) long, in the northeast part of Victoria Land, extending south from Cape Adare to Cape Roget. The peninsula was named by the New Zealand Antarctic Place-Names Committee (NZ-APC) for Cape Adare. The peninsula is considered the southernmost point of the Borchgrevink Coast, named for Carsten Borchgrevink (1864-1934).

== Geology ==
The Adare Peninsula consists of overlapping shield volcanoes that have been potassium–argon dated 6 to 13 million years old. Potassium–argon dates of 2.27 million years and perhaps 1.14 million years have also been obtained. The Adare Peninsula shields form part of the Hallett Volcanic Province of the McMurdo Volcanic Group.

== West coast features ==
Named features on the west coast, which faces Robertson Bay, are (from north to south):

=== Cape Adare ===
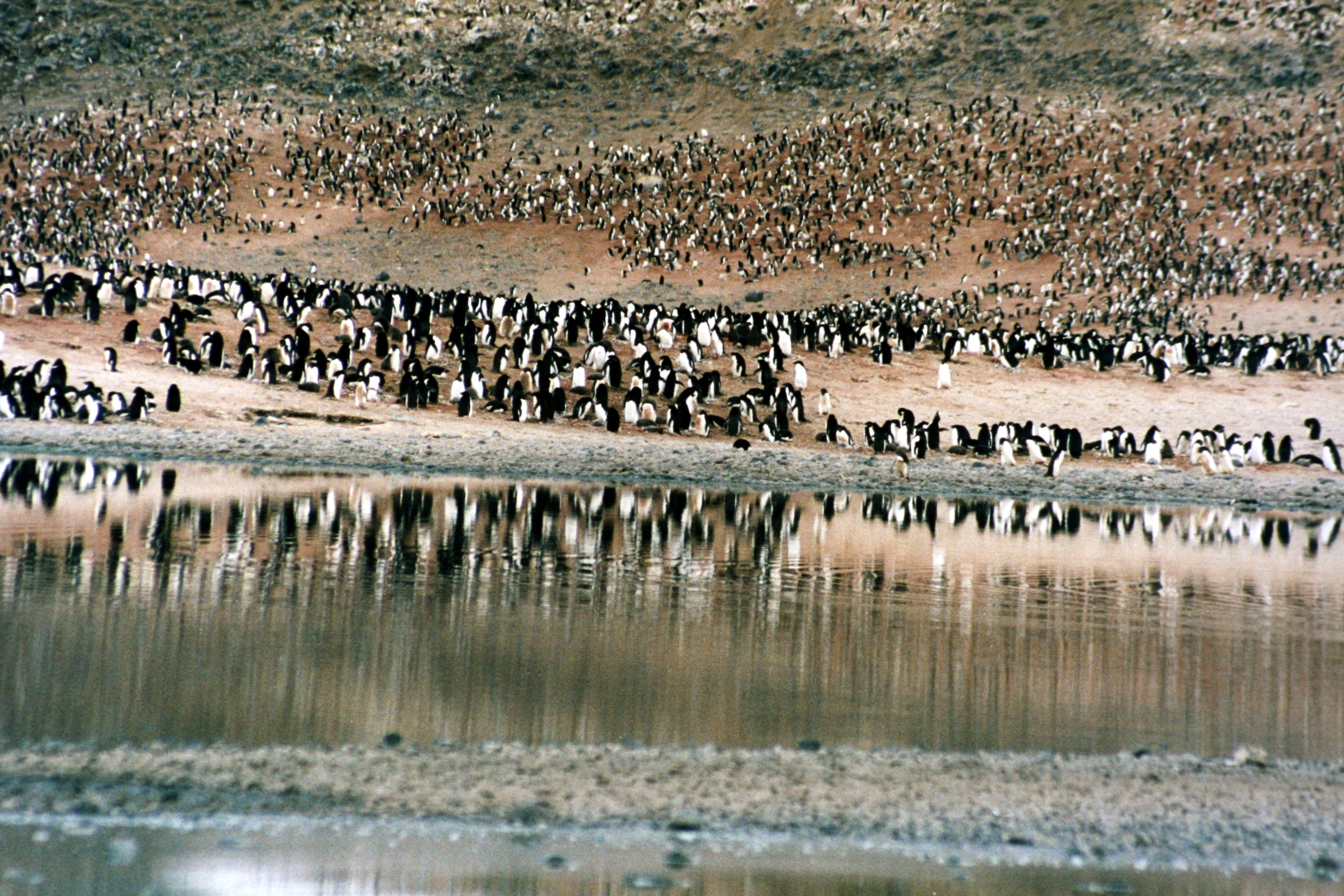
Adélie penguins at Cape Adare

71°17′S 170°14′E. A prominent cape of black basalt which is in visual contrast to the rest of the snow-covered coast, forming the north tip of Adare Peninsula. The cape marks the northeast extremity of Victoria Land and the west side of the entrance to the Ross Sea. Discovered in Jan. 1841 by Captain James Ross, Royal Navy, who named it for his friend Viscount Adare, M.P. for Glamorganshire.

=== The Sisters ===
71°17′S 170°13′E. Two stacks or pillar-like rocks standing together just north of Cape Adare at the northeast extremity of Victoria Land. First charted and named The Sisters by the British Antarctic Expedition, 1898-1900, under Carsten Borchgrevink. The northern pillar was later named Gertrude Rock, and the southern one Rose Rock, by the Northern Party of British Antarctic Expedition, 1910-13.

=== Gertrude Rock ===
71°17′S 170°13′E. The northern of two rocks called The Sisters, off the north extremity of Cape Adare. The Sisters were named by the British Antarctic Expedition, 1898-1900. Gertrude Rock was named by Campbell, leader of the Northern Party of the British Antarctic Expedition, 1910–13, at the suggestion of Levick, after Gertrude and Rose, two sisters mentioned in a favorite comic song of the time.

=== Rose Rock ===
71°17′S 170°13′E. The southern of two rocks called The Sisters, off the north extremity of Cape Adare. The Sisters were named by the British Antarctic Expedition, 1898-1900. Rose Rock was named by Campbell, leader of the Northern Party of the British Antarctic Expedition, 1910–13, at the suggestion of Levick, after a favorite comic song which concerned two sisters named Rose and Gertrude.

=== Ridley Beach ===
71°18′S 170°13′E. A cuspate beach feature forming a triangle about 1 nautical mile (1.9 km; 1.2 mi) long on each side, lying 1 nautical mile (1.9 km; 1.2 mi) south of Cape Adare, on the west side of Adare Peninsula in northern Victoria Land. This was the camp site of the British Antarctic Expedition, 1898-1900, under C.E. Borchgrevink. He gave the camp his mother's maiden name. The Northern Party, led by Campbell, of the British Antarctic Expedition, 1910–13, disembarked here in 1911, and they gave the name to the entire beach. The beach is the site of an Adélie penguin rookery.

=== Von Tunzelman Point ===
71°18′S 170°11′E. The west point of the cuspate Ridley Beach, 1 nautical mile (1.9 km; 1.2 mi) southwest of Cape Adare, Adare Peninsula, in northeast Victoria Land. Named in 1984 by the NZ-APC after Alexander Von Tunzelman, one of four New Zealanders taken on at Stewart Island as crew members of Antarctic, the ship of the Norwegian expedition, 1894–95, led by Captain Leonard Kristensen and Henrik J. Bull. He was a member of the launch party under Captain Kristensen which made a landing in the vicinity of this point, January 24, 1895, the first recorded landing in Victoria Land.

=== Boulder Rock ===
71°19′S 170°13′E. A rock lying along the west side of Adare Peninsula, immediately south of Ridley Beach, in northern Victoria Land. Charted and named in 1911 by the Northern Party led by Campbell of the British Antarctic Expedition, 1910-13.

=== Seal Point ===
71°22′S 170°14′E. A steep rock point 3.5 nautical miles (6.5 km; 4.0 mi) south of Ridley Beach on the west side of Adare Peninsula, northern Victoria Land. Charted and named in 1911 by the Northern Party, led by Campbell, of the British Antarctic Expedition, 1910-13.

=== Adare Saddle ===
71°44′S 170°12′E. A saddle at about 900 metres (3,000 ft) high, situated at the junction of Adare Peninsula and the Admiralty Mountains, and at the junction of Newnes Glacier and Moubray Glacier which fall steeply from it. Named by the New Zealand Geological Survey Antarctic Expedition (NZGSAE), 1957–58, in association with Adare Peninsula and Cape Adare.

== East coast features ==
Named features on the east coast, which faces the Ross Sea, are (from north to south):

=== Downshire Cliffs ===
71°37′S 170°36′E. A line of precipitous basalt cliffs rising to 2,000 metres (6,600 ft) above the Ross Sea and forming much of the east side of Adare Peninsula. In 1841 Captain James Ross applied the name "Cape Downshire" to a part of these cliffs. He did so at the request of Cdr. Francis R.M. Crozier of the Terror, after the latter's friend, the late Marquis Downshire. No prominent cape exists here and, for the sake of historical continuity, the name has been reapplied to these cliffs.

=== Hanson Peak ===
71°21′S 170°18′E. A small peak, 1,255 metres (4,117 ft) high, 4 nautical miles (7.4 km; 4.6 mi) south of Cape Adare in the north part of Adare Peninsula. Named by the NZ-APC after Nikolai Hanson, member of the British Antarctic Expedition, 1898-1900, under C.E. Borchgrevink, who was the first man known to have died on the Antarctic mainland (at Cape Adare, Oct. 14, 1899). Hanson's grave surmounts nearby Cape Adare.

=== Nestling Rock ===
71°23′S 170°24′E. A rock lying in the sea just east of the north portion of Adare Peninsula, along the coast of Victoria Land. The descriptive name applied by NZ-APC suggests the location of this relatively small feature beside towering Downshire Cliffs.

=== Fenwick Ice Piedmont ===
71.75°S 170.75°E. An ice piedmont on the east side of Adare Peninsula. The ice piedmont is formed by numerous glaciers draining the east side of Adare Peninsula between Downshire Cliffs and Cape McCormick. Named by New Zealand Geographic Board (NZGB) (2005) to honor the voluntary work and service given by Rob Fenwick over more than a decade to furthering the protection of historic sites under New Zealand’s care in Antarctica.

=== Cape McCormick ===
71°50′S 170°58′E. Cape marking the east extremity of Adare Peninsula in Victoria Land. Discovered by Captain James Ross, 1841, who named it for Robert McCormick, Surgeon on the Erebus.

=== Cape Roget ===
71°59′S 170°37′E. A steep rock cape at the south tip of Adare Peninsula, marking the north side of the entrance to Moubray Bay along the east coast of Victoria Land. Discovered by Captain James Ross, 1841, who named it for Peter Mark Roget, noted English lexicographer who was Secretary of the Royal Society. The cape is the site of an Emperor penguin rookery.

== Sources ==
- "Adare Peninsula", Global Volcanism Program, Smithsonian Institution
- Alberts, Fred G., ed. (1995), Geographic Names of the Antarctic (PDF) (2 ed.), United States Board on Geographic Names This article incorporates public domain material from websites or documents of the United States Board on Geographic Names.
- Cape Adare, USGS: United States Geological Survey, 1968
- "Fenwick Ice Piedmont", Geographic Names Information System, United States Geological Survey, United States Department of the Interior
- Riffenburgh, Beau (2007), Encyclopedia of the Antarctic, vol. 1, Taylor & Francis, ISBN 978-0-415-97024-2

This article incorporates public domain material from websites or documents of the United States Geological Survey.
