= Rennick Bay =

Bay in antarctica

- Location within Antarctica
- Coordinates: 70°6′S 161°20′E
- Ocean/sea sources: Southern Ocean

Rennick Bay (70°6′S 161°20′E) is an embayment of the coastline of Antarctica at the terminus of Rennick Glacier. It is bounded on the west and east by Belousov Point and Stuhlinger Ice Piedmont.

== Discovery and naming ==
The eastern part of the bay was discovered from the ship Terra Nova, of the British Antarctic Expedition (1910–13) under Scott. It was named by the British Antarctic Expedition for Lieutenant Henry E. de P. Rennick, Royal Navy, an officer on the Terra Nova. The bay was photographed by United States Navy Operation Highjump (1947) and by the Soviet Antarctic Expedition (1958).

According to the Sailing Directions for Antarctica, "Cape Cheetham appears to be an isolated pinnacle forming the eastern extremity of Rennick Bay, an embayment about 18 miles wide, the western extremity of which is formed by high cliffs with outcroppings of rock.

== Location ==
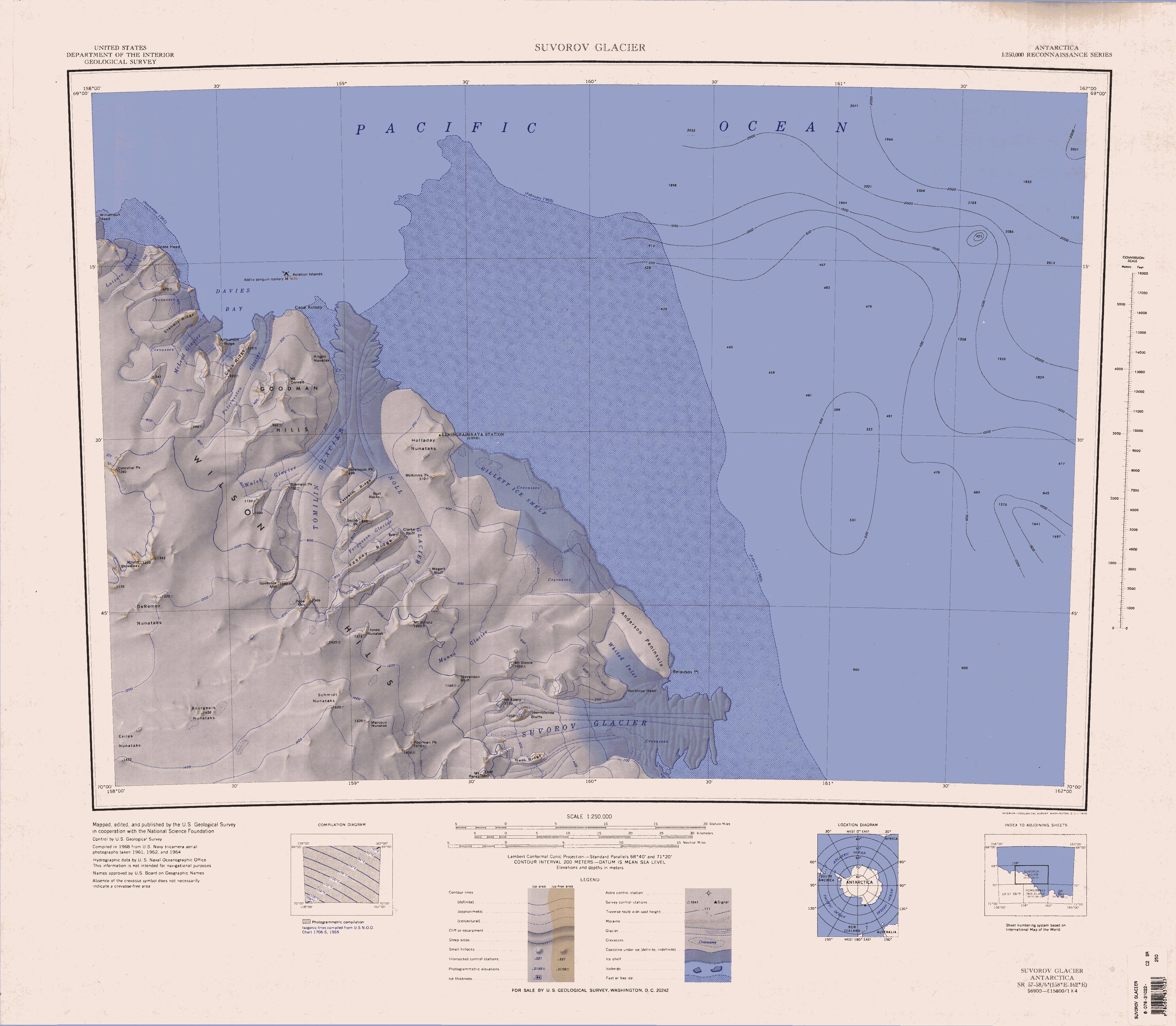
Western limit of the bay, south center of map

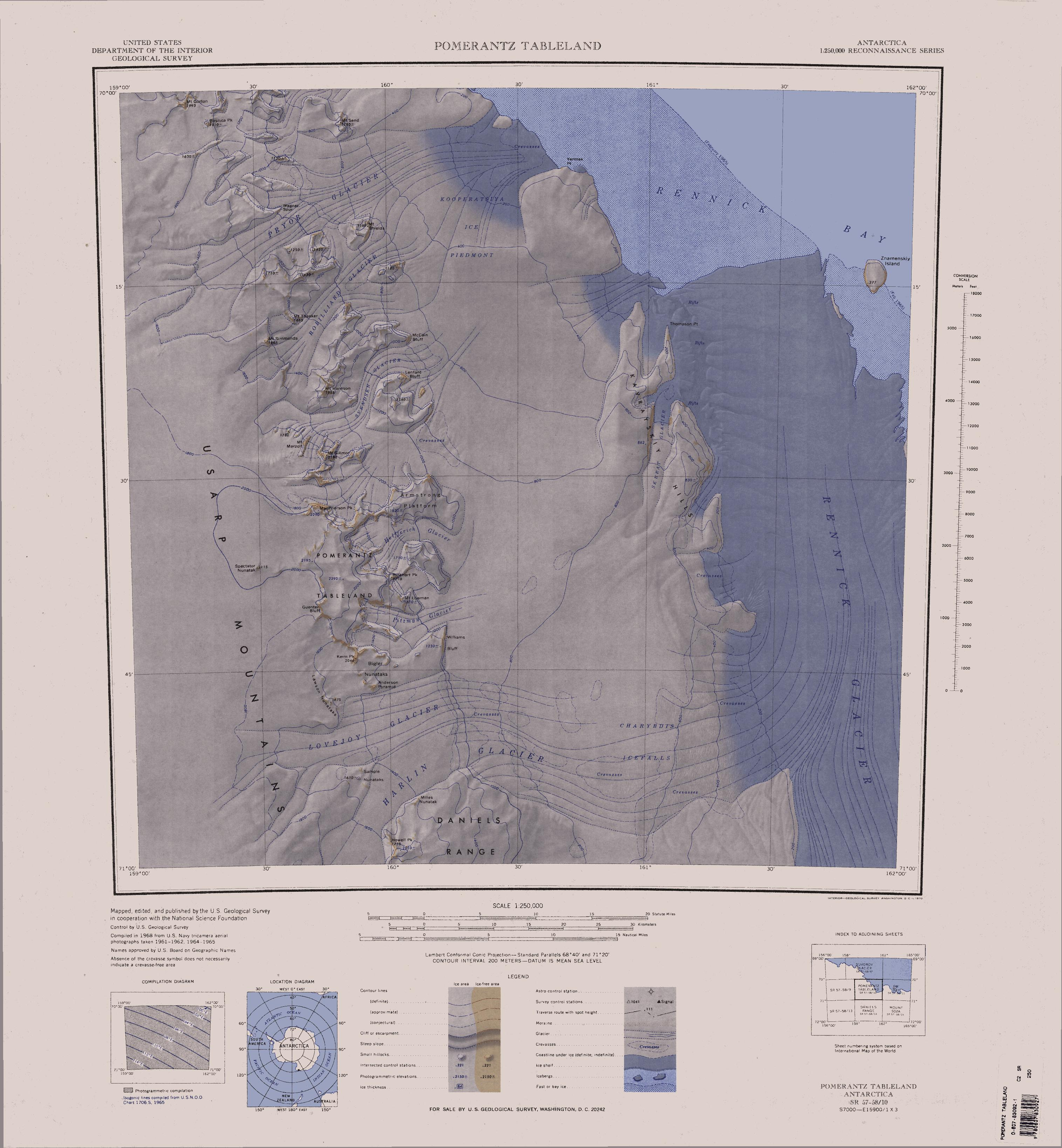
Western side of the bay

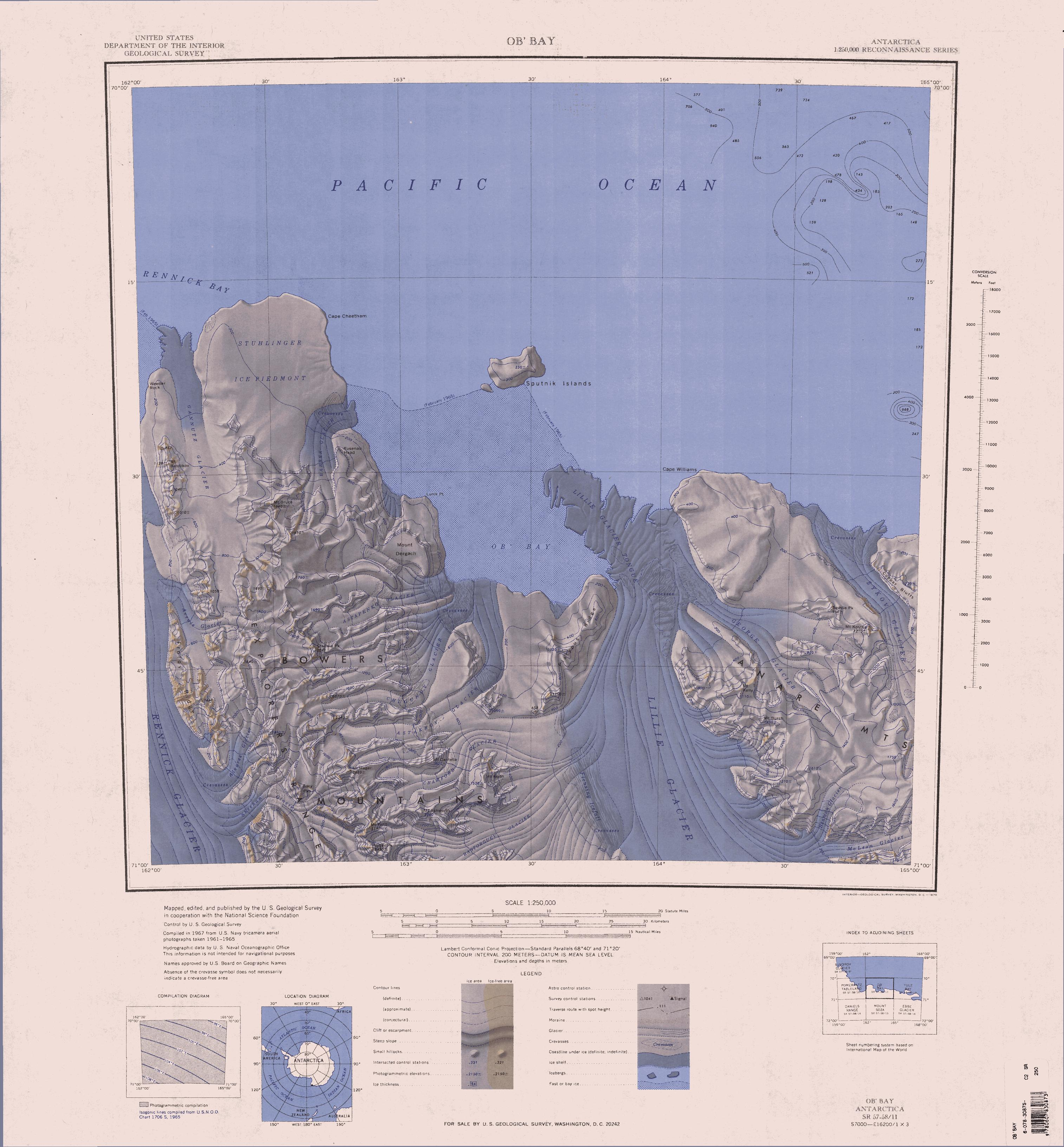
Eastern side of the bay, northwest of map

The northwestern end of the bay is defined by Belousov Point on the end of the Anderson Peninsula. The Suvorov Glacier enters the bay and forms an ice tongue immediately south of this point. To its south the Pryor Glacier enters the bay to the north of Yermak Point. From just north of Thompson Point in the Kavrayskiy Hills the Rennick Glacier and its tributaries fill the bay. One tributary is Serrat Glacier, which flows through the Kavrayskiy Hills. To the northeast of the Rennick Glacier is Znamenskiy Island. East of the Rennick Glacier past Weeder Rock the Gannutz Glacier enters the bay from the north of the Explorers Range. The Cape Cheetham on the Stuhlinger Ice Piedmont marks the southeast limit of the bay. Ob' Bay begins further to the southeast.

== Features ==
=== Belousov Point ===
69°51′S 160°20′E. An ice-covered point forming the south tip of Anderson Peninsula, located just north of the terminus of Suvorov Glacier. The point was mapped by the Soviet Antarctic Expedition of 1958 and named for the Soviet polar captain Mikhail P. Belousov, 1904–46.

=== Yermak Point ===
70°06′S 160°41′E. A coastal point in the west part of Rennick Bay, 25 nautical miles (46 km; 29 mi) west-northwest of Znamenskiy Island. Named by the Soviet Antarctic Expedition (1958) after the Soviet icebreaker Yermak.

=== Kavrayskiy Hills ===
70°27′S 161°5′E. A line of mostly ice-covered coastal hills in Antarctica, rising south of Rennick Bay and along the west side of the lower end of Rennick Glacier. They were charted by the Soviet Antarctic Expedition (1958) and named after Vladimir V. Kavrayskiy (1884–1954), a Soviet geodesist and cartographer.

=== Thompson Point ===
70°18′S 161°04′E. A point of land which descends northeastward from Kavrayskiy Hills into the west part of the terminus of Rennick Glacier. Mapped by the United States Geological Survey (USGS) from surveys and United States Navy aerial photographs, 1960–62. Named by the United States Advisory Committee on Antarctic Names (US-ACAN) for Max C. Thompson, United States Antarctic Research Program (USARP) biologist at McMurdo Station, 1966–67.

=== Serrat Glacier ===
70°24′S 161°04′E. A glacier, 10 nautical miles (19 km; 12 mi) long, flowing north through the middle of Kavrayskiy Hills into the west side of Rennick Glacier. Mapped by the USGS from surveys and U.S. Navy aerial photographs, 1960–62. Named by the US-ACAN for Javier Serrat of the University of Chile, who worked (electrical engineering) at the USARP McMurdo Station, 1967–68.

=== Znamenskiy Island ===
70°14′S 161°51′E. A high, nearly round, ice-covered island 2.5 nautical miles (4.6 km; 2.9 mi) long, lying in Rennick Bay just north of the terminus of Rennick Glacier. Charted by the Soviet Antarctic Expedition in 1958 and named for Soviet hydrographer K.I. Znamenskiy (1903–41).

=== Weeder Rock ===
70°23′S 162°02′E. A small isolated coastal rock located 6 nautical miles (11 km; 6.9 mi) north-northwest of Mount Belolikov. It rises above the smooth, ice-covered peninsula between the mouths of Rennick and Gannutz Glaciers. Mapped by USGS from surveys and United States Navy air photos, 1960–64. Named by US-ACAN for Courtland C. Weeder, United States Navy, storekeeper with the South Pole Station winter party, 1965.

=== Gannutz Glacier ===
70°24′S 162°11′E. A smooth glacier which flows north from the Bowers Mountains and enters the east part of Rennick Bay between Weeder Rock and Stuhlinger Ice Piedmont. Mapped by USGS from surveys and U.S. Navy air photos, 1960–65. Named by US-ACAN for Theodore P. Gannutz, biologist at Hallett Station in the 1966–67 season; station scientific leader at Palmer Station in 1968.

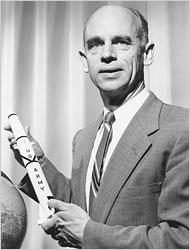
Ernst Stuhlinger 1958

=== Stuhlinger Ice Piedmont ===
70°22′S 162°30′E A coastal ice piedmont, about 10 nautical miles (19 km; 12 mi) long and wide, located immediately north of the Bowers Mountains and between the lower ends of Gannutz Glacier and Barber Glacier. Mapped by USGS from surveys and U.S. Navy air photos, 1960–62. Named by US-ACAN in 1968 for Ernst Stuhlinger, National Aeronautics and Space Administration, a member of the U.S. National Science Foundation's Advisory Panel for Antarctic Programs.

=== Cape Cheetham ===
70°18′S 162°42′E. An ice-covered cape forming the northeast extremity of Stuhlinger Ice Piedmont. First charted by members of the British Antarctic Expedition, 1910–13, who explored this coast in the Terra Nova in February 1911. Named for Alfred B. Cheetham, boatswain on the Terra Nova. This identification of Cape Cheetham is in accord with the location assigned on maps of the ANARE.

== Sources ==
- Alberts, Fred G., ed. (1995), Geographic Names of the Antarctic (PDF) (2 ed.), United States Board on Geographic Names This article incorporates public domain material from websites or documents of the United States Board on Geographic Names.
- Ob' Bay, USGS: United States Geological Survey
- Pomerantz Tableland, USGS: United States Geological Survey
- Sailing Directions for Antarctica: Including the Off-lying Islands South of Latitude 60.̊, United States. Hydrographic Office, 1976
- Suvorov Glacier, USGS: United States Geological Survey

This article incorporates public domain material from websites or documents of the United States Geological Survey.
