= Mount Stirling (Antarctica) =

Mountain in Antarctica

- Location within Antarctica

Geography
- Continent: Antarctica
- Region(s): Victoria Land, Antarctica
- Range coordinates: 71°33′S 164°07′E

Mount Stirling (71°33′S 164°07′E) is a mountain, 2,260 metres (7,410 ft) high, in the Bowers Mountains, Antarctica. It is located 5 nautical miles (9.3 km; 5.8 mi) southwest of Mount Freed where it forms part of the east wall of Leap Year Glacier. It was named by the New Zealand Geological Survey Antarctic Expedition (NZGSAE), 1967–1968, after Ian Stirling, a zoologist from the University of Canterbury at Scott Base in that season.

== Location ==
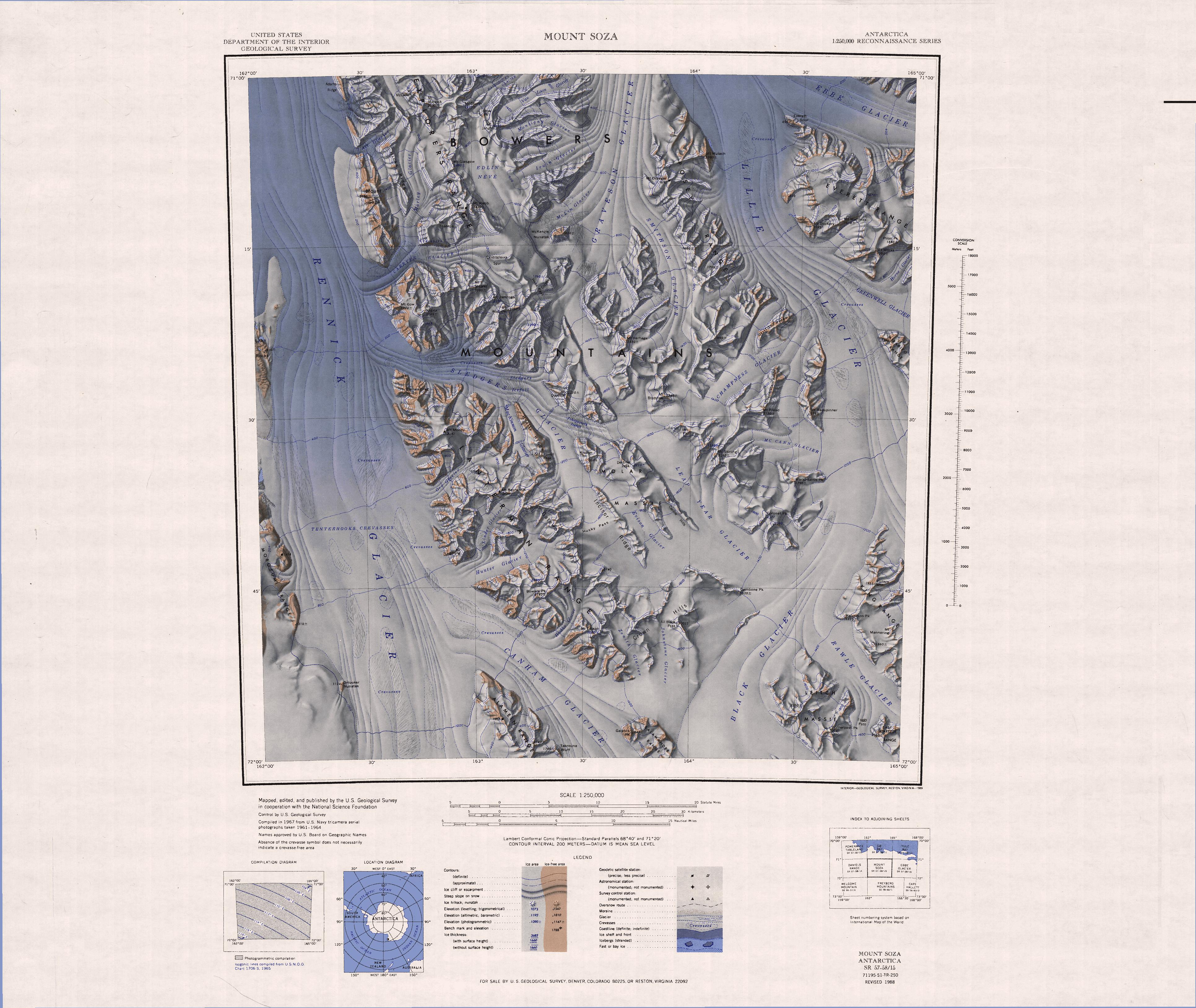
Mount Stirling towards the southeast of map

Mount Stirling and the nearby mountain group lie to the northeast of the Leap Year Glacier. This is a tributary of the Black Glacier, which flows past the east of the group, where it merges with the Lillie Glacier. McCann Glacier flows east from Mount Stirling to the Lillie Glacier. . The Champness Glacier runs past the north of the group. The Posey Range is to the north, the Molar Massif is to the west, and the Crown Hills are to the southwest. The Leitch Massif and King Range are to the southeast.

== Nearby features ==
=== Ian Peak ===
71°31′S 163°59′E. A peak located 3 nautical miles (5.6 km; 3.5 mi) northwest of Mount Stirling where the feature overlooks the heads of Leap Year and Champness Glaciers. Named by the NZGSAE, 1967-68, for Ian Smith, Victoria University of Wellington geologist in Antarctica that season.

=== Coronet Peak ===
71°39′S 164°21′E. A peak, 2,175 metres (7,136 ft) high, standing at the east side of the terminus of Leap Year Glacier in the southeast extremity of the Bowers Mountains. So named by NZGSAE, 1967-68, because it is a fine peak. It was climbed by two members of the expedition.

=== Markinsenis Peak ===
71°35′S 164°29′E. A peak 1,790 metres (5,870 ft) high on the south side of McCann Glacier at its junction with Lillie Glacier. Mapped by the United States Geological Survey (USGS) from surveys and United States Navy air photos, 1960-64. Named by the United States Advisory Committee on Antarctic Names (US-ACAN) for radioman Ronald Markinsenis, United States Navy, of the South Pole Station winter party, 1965.

=== Mount Freed ===
71°29′S 164°20′E. A mountain, 2,120 metres (6,960 ft) high, that surmounts the divide between the Champness and McCann Glaciers. Mapped by USGS from surveys and United States Navy air photos, 1960-62. Named by US-ACAN for Commander M.G. Freed, legal officer on the staff of the Commander, United States Naval Support Force, Antarctica, 1966-68.

=== Copperstain Ridge ===
71°27′S 164°22′E. A ridge about 3 nautical miles (5.6 km; 3.5 mi) long which descends north-northeast from Mount Freed. The feature was so named by NZGSAE, 1967-68, because of the extensive copper staining found here.

=== Mount Radspinner ===
71°29′S 164°33′E. A conspicuous ridge-like mountain, 1,785 metres (5,856 ft) high, located just east of Mount Freed and Copperstain Ridge. Named by US-ACAN for Captain Frank H. Radspinner, Jr., United States Army, commanding officer of the helicopter detachment that supported the USGS Topo East-West party that surveyed this area in 1962-63.

== Sources ==
- Alberts, Fred G., ed. (1995), Geographic Names of the Antarctic (PDF) (2 ed.), United States Board on Geographic Names This article incorporates public domain material from websites or documents of the United States Board on Geographic Names.
- Mount Soza, USGS: United States Geographic Board

This article incorporates public domain material from websites or documents of the United States Geological Survey.
