= Explorers Range =

Large mountain range in Antarctica

- Location within Antarctica

Geography
- Continent: Antarctica
- Region(s): Victoria Land, Antarctica
- Range coordinates: 70°50′S 162°45′E

Explorers Range (70°50′S 162°45′E) is a large mountain range in the Bowers Mountains of Victoria Land, Antarctica, extending from Mount Bruce in the north to Carryer Glacier and McLin Glacier in the south.

== Exploration and naming ==
The Explorers Range was named by the New Zealand Antarctic Place-Names Committee (NZ-APC) for the northern party of New Zealand Geological Survey Antarctic Expedition (NZGSAE), 1963–64, whose members carried out a topographical and geological survey of the area. The names of several party members are assigned to features in and about this range.

== Location ==
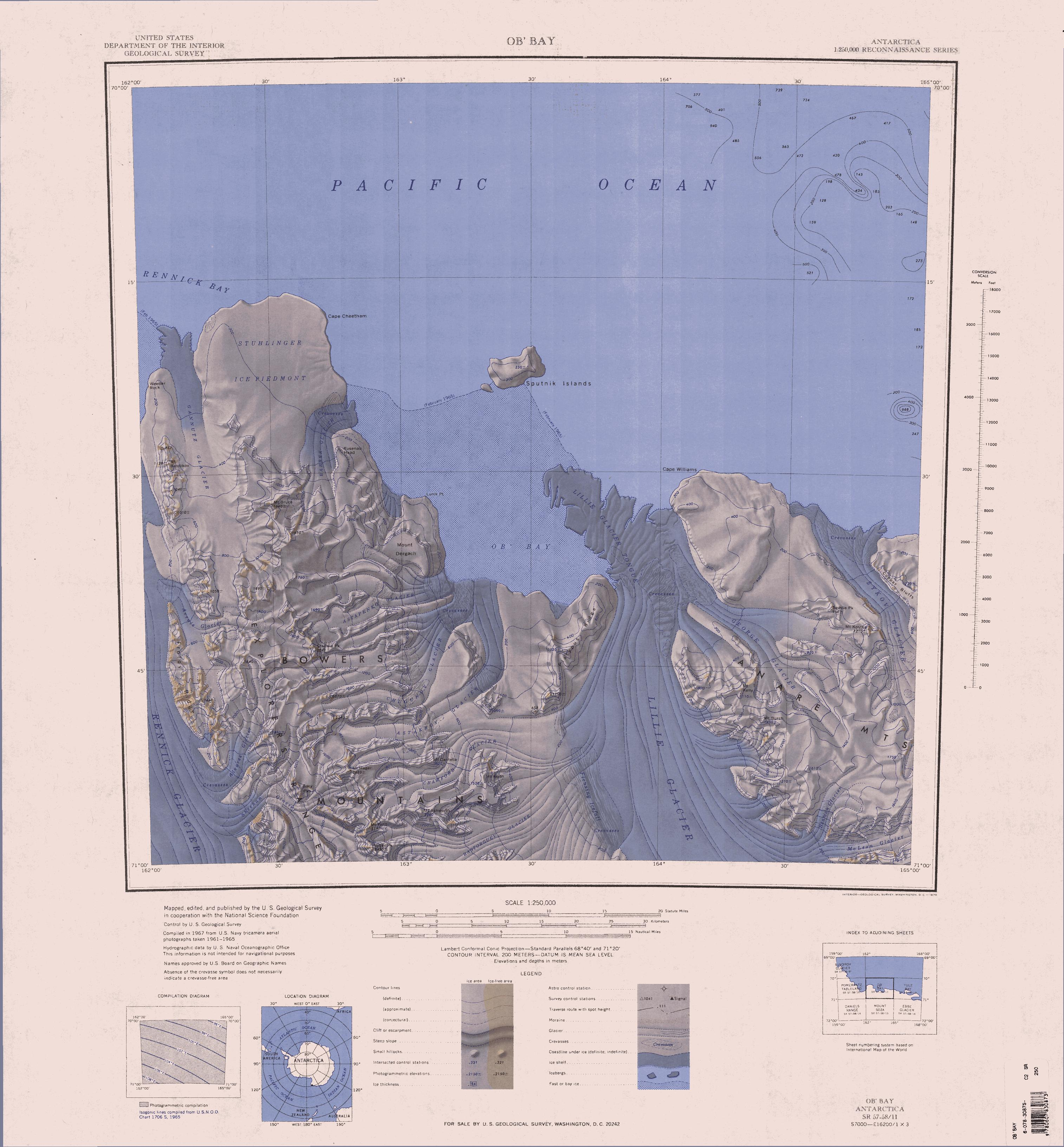
Northern part of the range to southwest

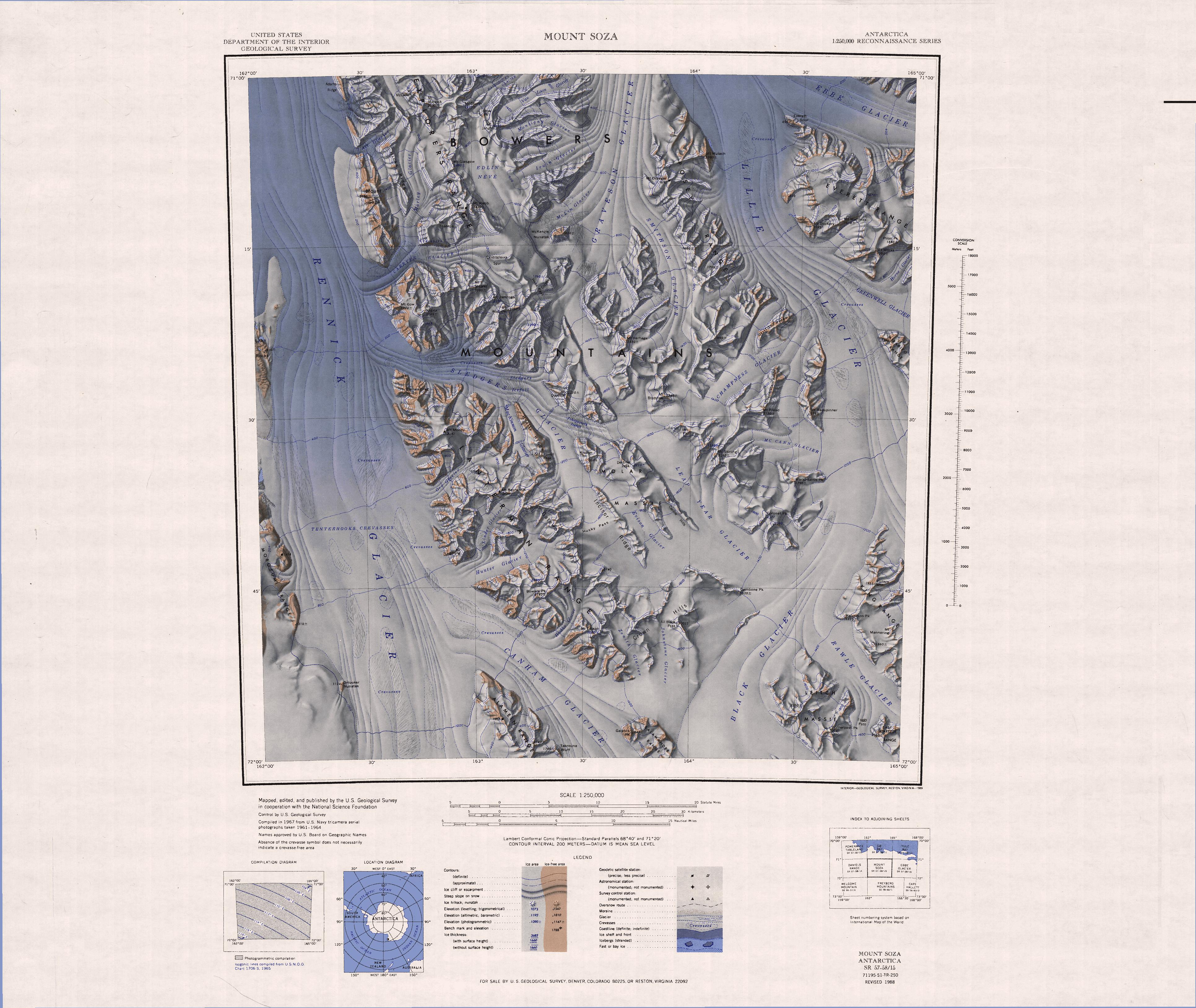
Southern part of the range to northwest

The Explorers Range is south of the Stuhlinger Ice Piedmont, Cape Cheetham and Gannutz Glacier. The Rennick Glacier flows north to the sea along its western side. Glaciers originating in the northern Explorer Range that flow into this glacier include, from north to south, Arruiz Glacier, Alvarez Glacier and Sheehan Glacier. Ob' Bay is to the east of the northern part of the range, which is fed by glaciers originating in the Explorers Range, including Barber Glacier, Astapenko Glacier, Chugunov Glacier and Astakhov Glacier, Further south Crawford Glacier and Rastorguev Glacier feed the Lillie Glacier to the east.

Glaciers flowing west into the Rennick Glacier from the center and south of the Explorers Range include, from north to south, Alt Glacier, Morley Glacier, Carryer Glacier and Sledgers Glacier, which divides the range from the Lanterman Range to the south. The Edlin Névé is to the east of the range. Glaciers flowing east from this névé or from the Explorers Range include, from north to south, the Van Loon Glacier, Montigny Glacier, Irwin Glacier, McLin Glacier and Graveson Glacier. The Posey Range is to the east of the Graveson Glacier.

== Northern features ==
Features to the north of the Arruiz Glacier and Astapenko Glacier include Mount Belolikov, Mount Bruce, Rosenau Head, Lunik Point and Mount Dergach.

=== Mount Belolikov ===
70°29′S 162°07′E. Mountain 1,120 metres (3,670 ft) high along the west wall of Gannutz Glacier, about 8 nautical miles (15 km; 9.2 mi) west-northwest of Mount Bruce. Photographed from the air by United States Navy Operation Highjump, 1946-47. Surveyed by the Soviet Antarctic Expedition in 1958 and named after Soviet meteorologist A.M. Belolikov, who perished in a fire at Mirnyy Station on August 3, 1960.

=== Mount Bruce ===
70°32′S 162°30′E. Prominent mountain 1,640 metres (5,380 ft) high rising just south of Stuhlinger Ice Piedmont and between the Gannutz Glacier and Barber Glacier. Discovered by members of the British Antarctic Expedition, 1910–13 (BrAE), who explored along this coast in the Terra Nova in February 1911. Named for Lieutenant Wilfred M. Bruce, RNR, officer in charge of zoological work aboard the Terra Nova.

=== Rosenau Head ===
70°28′S 162°46′E. A steep, ice-covered coastal headland located on the east side of Barber Glacier in the Bowers Mountains. Mapped by the United States Geological Survey (USGS) from surveys and United States Navy air photos, 1960-62. Named by the United States Advisory Committee on Antarctic Names (US-ACAN) for Darrell D. Rosenau, United States Navy, electronics technician at the South Pole Station, 1965.

== Central features ==
Features of the central part of the range, north of Sheehan Glacier and Rastorguev Glacier, include, from north to south, Stanwix Peak, Frolov Ridge, Mount Cantello, Mount Keith, Mount Hager, Gary Peak, Mount Ashworth, Mount Ford and Miller Peak.

=== Stanwix Peak ===
70°43′S 162°39′E. A distinctive peak 2,240 metres (7,350 ft) high which surmounts the south side of the head of Astapenko Glacier. The peak was used as a reference object by surveyor S. Kirkby, with the Australian National Antarctic Research Expedition (ANARE) (Thala Dan), 1962. Named by the Australian National Antarctic Research Expedition (ANARE) for Captain John Stanwix, helicopter pilot with the expedition.

=== Frolov Ridge ===
70°45′S 162°09′E. Prominent ridge about 11 nautical miles (20 km; 13 mi) long, trending north–south, located just west of Arruiz Glacier. Photographed from the air by United States Navy Operation High Jump, 1946-47. Surveyed by SovAE in 1958 and named after V.V. Frolov, Soviet polar investigator, director of the Arctic and Antarctic Scientific Research Institute.

=== Mount Cantello ===
70°52′S 163°07′E. Mountain 1,820 metres (5,970 ft) high on the north side of Crawford Glacier, 4 nautical miles (7.4 km; 4.6 mi) northwest of Mount Keith. Mapped by USGS from surveys and United States Navy air photos, 1960-65. Named by US-ACAN for Dominic Cantello, Jr., United States Navy, electrician with the South Pole Station party, 1965.

=== Mount Keith ===
70°54′S 163°19′E. Mountain 1,530 metres (5,020 ft) high surmounting the east end of the ridge between Rastorguev and Crawford Glaciers. Mapped by USGS from surveys and United States Navy air photos, 1960-65. Named by US-ACAN for John D. Keith, builder, United States Navy, a member of the South Pole Station party, 1965.

=== Mount Hager ===
70°53′S 162°48′E. Mountain 2,420 metres (7,940 ft) high located 6 nautical miles (11 km; 6.9 mi) west of Mount Cantello. Mapped by USGS from surveys and United States Navy air photos, 1960-65. Named by US-ACAN for Clarence L. Hager, geophysicist at the South Pole Station, 1967-68.

=== Gary Peaks ===
70°54′S 162°35′E. Two peaks which form a portion of the north wall of Sheehan Glacier, situated 4 nautical miles (7.4 km; 4.6 mi) west-southwest of Mount Hager. Mapped by USGS from surveys and United States Navy air photos, 1960-65. Named by US-ACAN for Gary F. Martin, United States Navy, machinery repairman at the South Pole Station in 1965.

=== Mount Ashworth ===
70°56′S 163°05′E. A peak 2,060 metres (6,760 ft) high 4 nautical miles (7.4 km; 4.6 mi) east-northeast of Mount Ford in the Bowers Mountains. Named by ANARE for Squadron Leader N. Ashworth, RAAF, officer in charge of the Antarctic Flight with ANARE (Thala Dan), 1962, led by Phillip Law, which explored the area.

=== Mount Ford ===
70°57′S 162°52′E. A prominent mountain 2,580 metres (8,460 ft) high located 2 nautical miles (3.7 km; 2.3 mi) north of Miller Peak and 4 nautical miles (7.4 km; 4.6 mi) west-southwest of Mount Ashworth. Explored by the northern party of NZGSAE, 1963-64, and named for M.R.J. Ford who wintered at Scott Base and was deputy leader-surveyor of the northern party.

=== Miller Peak ===
70°59′S 162°53′E. A peak 2,420 metres (7,940 ft) high located 2 nautical miles (3.7 km; 2.3 mi) south of Mount Ford. Explored by the northern party of NZGSAE, 1963-64, and named for J.H. "Bob" (now Sir J. Holmes) Miller, leader-surveyor of that party.

== Southern features ==
Features of the southern part of the range include, from north to south, Adams Ridge, Mount McAllum, Mount Marwick, Mount Sturm, Dow Peak, Mount Janus, Mount Glasgow, Mount Soza, Mount Webb, Mount Tokoroa.

=== Adams Ridge ===
71°00′S 162°23′E. A sharp-crested rock ridge, 4 nautical miles (7.4 km; 4.6 mi) long and rising to 800 metres (2,600 ft) high, forming a part of the west margin of Bowers Mountains just south of where Sheehan Glacier enters Rennick Glacier. Named by NZ-APC in 1983 after Chris Adams, New Zealand geologist who worked in northern Victoria Land, 1981-82.

=== Mount McCallum ===
71°01′S 162°45′E. A peak rising to about 2,200 metres (7,200 ft) high immediately northwest of 2,590 metres (8,500 ft) Mount Marwick. The naming was proposed by M.G. Laird, leader of a NZARP geological party to the area, 1981-82. Named after G. McCallum, New Zealand scientist and mountaineer who perished in an avalanche on Mount Ruapehu, N.Z., in 1981. He worked in Antarctica in the 1963-64 season.

=== Mount Marwick ===
71°02′S 162°48′E. A high peak rising to 2,590 metres (8,500 ft) high at the head of Morley Glacier, 2.5 nautical miles (4.6 km; 2.9 mi) west of Mount Sturm. Named by the NZ-APC in 1982 after John Marwick (1891-1978), Chief Paleontologist, New Zealand Geological Survey.

=== Mount Sturm ===
71°03′S 162°58′E. A peak, 2,320 metres (7,610 ft) high, standing directly at the head of Rastorguev Glacier. Named by the northern party of the NZGSAE, 1963-64, for Arnold Sturm, senior geologist with the expedition.

=== Dow Peak ===
71°03′S 163°04′E. A peak located 2 nautical miles (3.7 km; 2.3 mi) east-southeast of Mount Sturm. Named by the NZGSAE to northern Victoria Land, 1967-68, for its senior geologist, J.A.S. Dow.

=== Mount Janus ===
71°04′S 163°06′E. A bifurcated peak rising to 2,420 metres (7,940 ft) high at the north side of the head of Montigny Glacier. Named by the NZ-APC on the proposal of geologist R.A. Cooper, leader of a NZARP geological party to the area, 1981-82. Named after Janus, the deity of portals in Roman mythology, symbolized as having two faces.

=== Mount Glasgow ===
71°08′S 162°55′E. A mountain, 2,490 metres (8,170 ft) high, standing 4 nautical miles (7.4 km; 4.6 mi) northwest of Mount Webb. Named by NZGSAE, 1967-68, for J. Glasgow, field assistant with the expedition.

=== Mount Soza ===
71°10′S 162°34′E. A massive mountain 2,190 metres (7,190 ft) high that comprises the east wall of the Rennick Glacier between the entry points of the tributary Alt Glacier and Carryer Glacier. Named by US-ACAN after Ezekiel R. Soza, USGS topographic engineer, a member of USGS Topo North and South, 1961-62, and Topo East and West, 1962-63. Using Army turbine helicopters for rapid movement, these survey parties established geodetic control in the Transantarctic Mountains between the Cape Hallett area and Beardmore Glacier during the first season (Topo North and South). During the second season geodetic control was extended from Cape Hallett to Wilson Hills (Topo West), and from the foot of Beardmore Glacier through the Horlick Mountains (Topo East). Soza was leader of the USGS mapping party in the Pensacola Mountains, 1965-66 season.

=== Hicks Ridge ===
71°09′S 162°40′E. A rugged ridge located between Mount Soza and Morley Glacier in the Explorers Range, Bowers Mountains. Mapped by USGS from surveys and United States Navy air photos, 1960-62. Named by US-ACAN for Thomas Hicks, United States Navy, cook with the McMurdo Station winter party, 1967.

=== Mount Webb ===
71°11′S 163°00′E A mountain 2,430 metres (7,970 ft) high rising 4 nautical miles (7.4 km; 4.6 mi) southeast of Mount Glasgow at the west side of Edlin Névé. Named by the NZGSAE, 1967-68, for William Webb, leader of the Scott Base winter party, 1968.

=== Mount Tokoroa ===
71°13′S 162°50′E. A massive snow-covered mountain on a spur from the Explorers Range, standing 6 nautical miles (11 km; 6.9 mi) southeast of the summit of Mount Soza at the junction of the Morley Glacier and Carryer Glacier. Mapped by the USGS Topo West party, 1962-63, and named by members of this party for Tokoroa, New Zealand, in recognition of its kindness to United States ArmyRP personnel.

== Features to the south ==
Features to the south of the range, south of Carryer Glacier, include Helix Pass, Curphey Peaks, Mount Shearer, Mount Jamroga, Mount Wodzicki, Mount Nagata and Mount Gow.

=== Centropleura Spur ===
71°17′S 163°11′E. The southwest spur of a small massif enclosing a cirque, located at the head of Carryer Glacier, 3 nautical miles (5.6 km; 3.5 mi) northeast of Mount Jamroga. The spur includes a sedimentary sequence which contains the Middle Cambrian fossil Centropleura. Named by R.A. Cooper, leader of NZARP geological field parties to this area, 1974-75 and 1981-82.

=== Helix Pass ===
71°18′S 163°18′E. A small north-south pass 4 nautical miles (7.4 km; 4.6 mi) east-northeast of Mount Jamroga in the central Bowers Mountains. The pass lies between unnamed peaks and permits passage from the area at the head of Carryer Glacier to areas in the southern part of Bowers Mountains. So named by NZGSAE, 1967-68, because ascent of the pass required an all night trip with much zigzagging and climbing; thus named after the genus of land snail, Helix.

=== Curphey Peaks ===
71°18′S 163°23′E. Two snow-covered peaks of approximately similar height, the western peak 1,760 metres (5,770 ft) high, the two peaks bounding the east side of Helix Pass. Named by the NZ-APC in 1983 after lan Curphey, field leader of M.G. Laird's NZARP geological party to the area, 1974-75.

=== Mount Shearer ===
71°19′S 163°00′E A peak rising to 2,100 metres (6,900 ft) high, 2 nautical miles (3.7 km; 2.3 mi) northwest of Mount Jamroga in the central portion of the Bowers Mountains. Named by the NZ-APC in 1983 after lan J. Shearer, elected to the New Zealand Parliament, 1975; Minister of Science and Technology, 1980-83.

=== Mount Wodzicki ===
71°21′S 163°10′E. The highest peak 2,380 metres (7,810 ft) high on the ridge between Mount Jamroga and Helix Pass in the central portion of the Bowers Mountains. Named by the NZ-APC after Jontek Wodzicki, NZARP geologist who climbed and studied the geology of this peak in the 1974-75 season.

=== Mount Jamroga ===
71°20′S 163°06′E. A mountain, 2,265 metres (7,431 ft) high, located 8 nautical miles (15 km; 9.2 mi) east of Mount Gow in the rugged heights between Carryer and Sledgers Glaciers. Mapped by USGS from surveys and United States Navy air photos, 1960-64. Named by US-ACAN for Lieutenant Commander John J. Jamroga, photographic officer, United States Naval Support Force, Antarctica, 1967 and 1968.

=== Mount Nagata ===
71°21′S 162°47′E. A mostly snow-covered mountain rising to 2,140 metres (7,020 ft) high, located 2 nautical miles (3.7 km; 2.3 mi) east of Mount Gow in the Bowers Mountains (q.v.). Named by US-ACAN in 1984 after Takeshi Nagata (1913–1991), a pioneer in the study of paleomagnetism and Director of the National Institute of Polar Research in Japan.

=== Mount Gow ===
71°20′S 162°40′E. A mountain, 1,770 metres (5,810 ft) high, on the east side of Rennick Glacier in the Bowers Mountains. It marks the west end of the rugged heights between the mouths of Carryer and Sledgers Glaciers where these two tributaries enter Rennick Glacier. Mapped by USGS from surveys and United States Navy air photos, 1960-62. Named by US-ACAN for Anthony J. Gow, veteran Antarctic glaciologist, who carried on research at the Byrd, South Pole, and McMurdo Stations nearly every summer season from 1959 to 1969.

== Sources ==
- Alberts, Fred G., ed. (1995), Geographic Names of the Antarctic (PDF) (2 ed.), United States Board on Geographic Names This article incorporates public domain material from websites or documents of the United States Board on Geographic Names.
- Mount Soza, USGS: United States Geographic Board
- Ob' Bay, USGS: United States Geographic Board

This article incorporates public domain material from websites or documents of the United States Geological Survey.
