= Bowers Mountains =

Mountain range on the coast of the East Antarctic Victoria Land

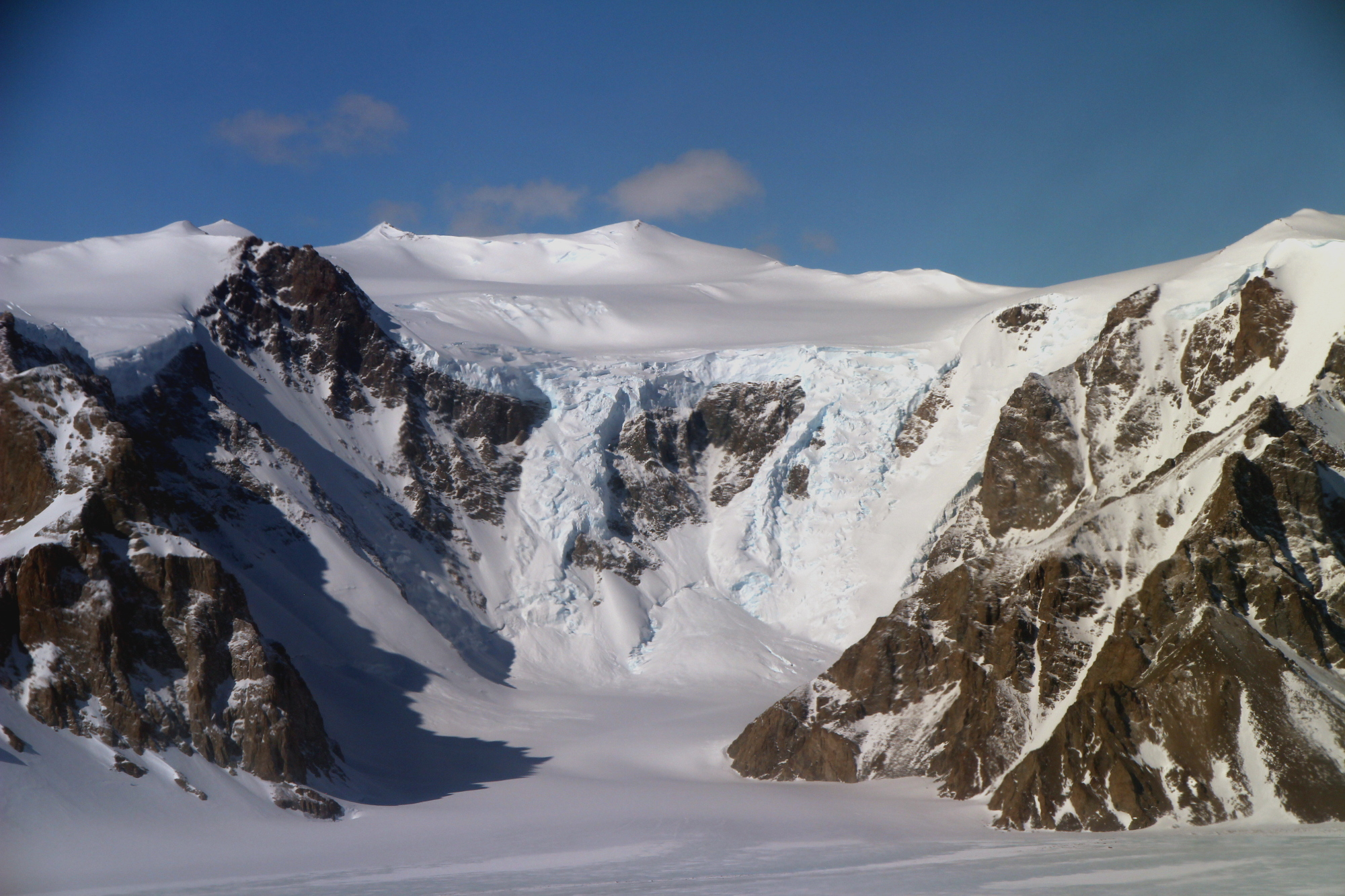
- An icefall in the Lanterman Range

Geography
- Location within Antarctica
- Continent: Antarctica
- Region(s): Victoria Land, Antarctica
- Range coordinates: 71°10′S 163°15′E

Bowers Mountains (71°10′S 163°15′E) is a group of north–south trending mountains in Antarctica, about 90 nautical miles (170 km; 100 mi) long and 35 nautical miles (65 km; 40 mi) wide, bounded by the coast on the north and by the Rennick Glacier, Canham Glacier, Black Glacier and Lillie Glacier in other quadrants. They are west of the Usarp Mountains, north of the Freyberg Mountains, northeast of the Concord Mountains, east of the Anare Mountains.

== Exploration and naming ==
The seaward end was first sighted in February 1911 from the Terra Nova, under Lt. Harry L.L. Pennell, Royal Navy, and was subsequently named "Bowers Hills" in honour of Henry Robertson Bowers who perished with Captain Robert Falcon Scott on their return from the South Pole in 1912. The feature was photographed from United States Navy aircraft in 1946-47 and 1960–62, and was surveyed and mapped by the United States Geological Survey (USGS) in 1962–63. The name was amended to Bowers Mountains upon USGS mapping which showed the group to be a major one with peaks rising to nearly 2,600 metres (8,500 ft).

== Location ==
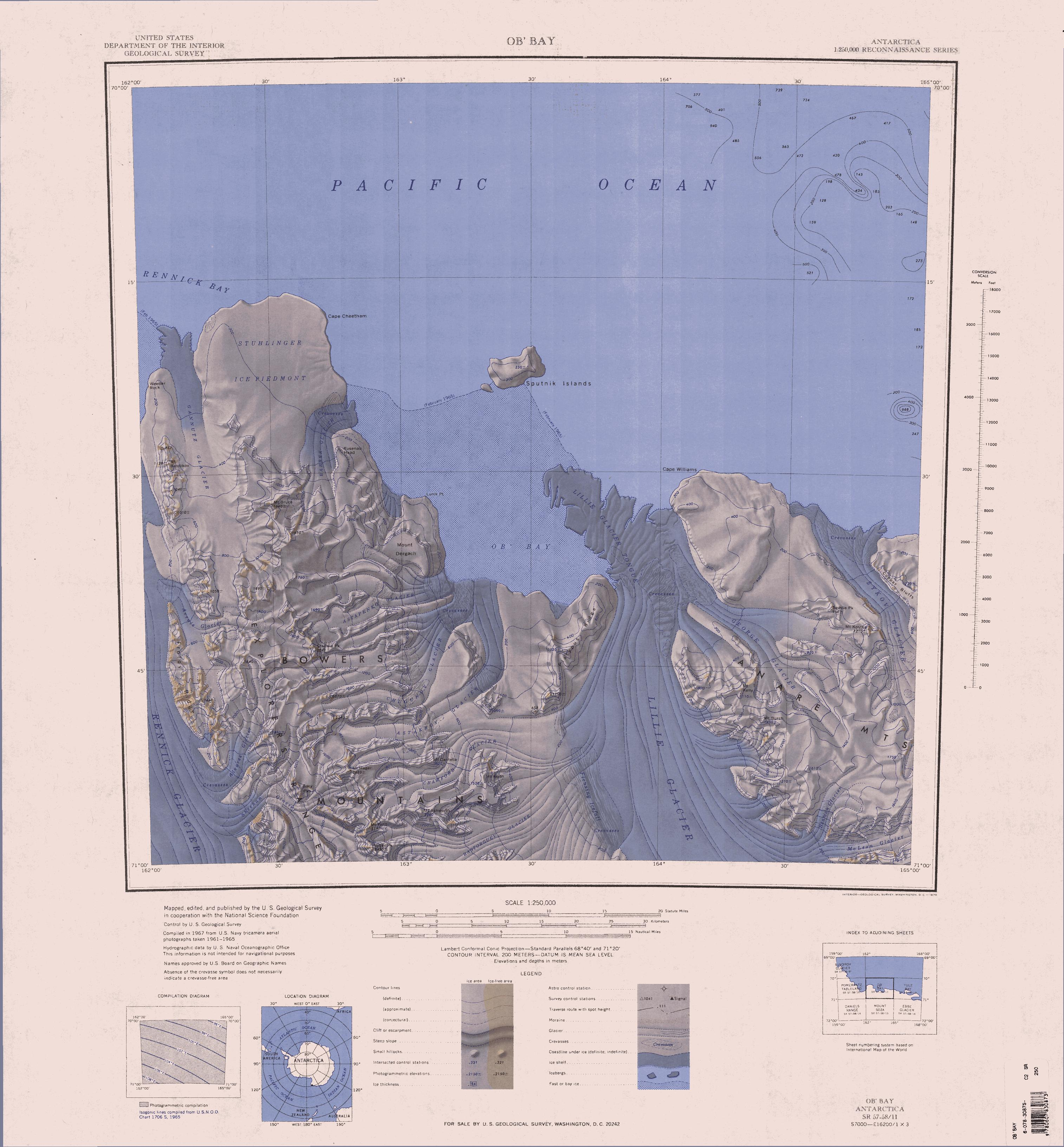
Northern part of the range

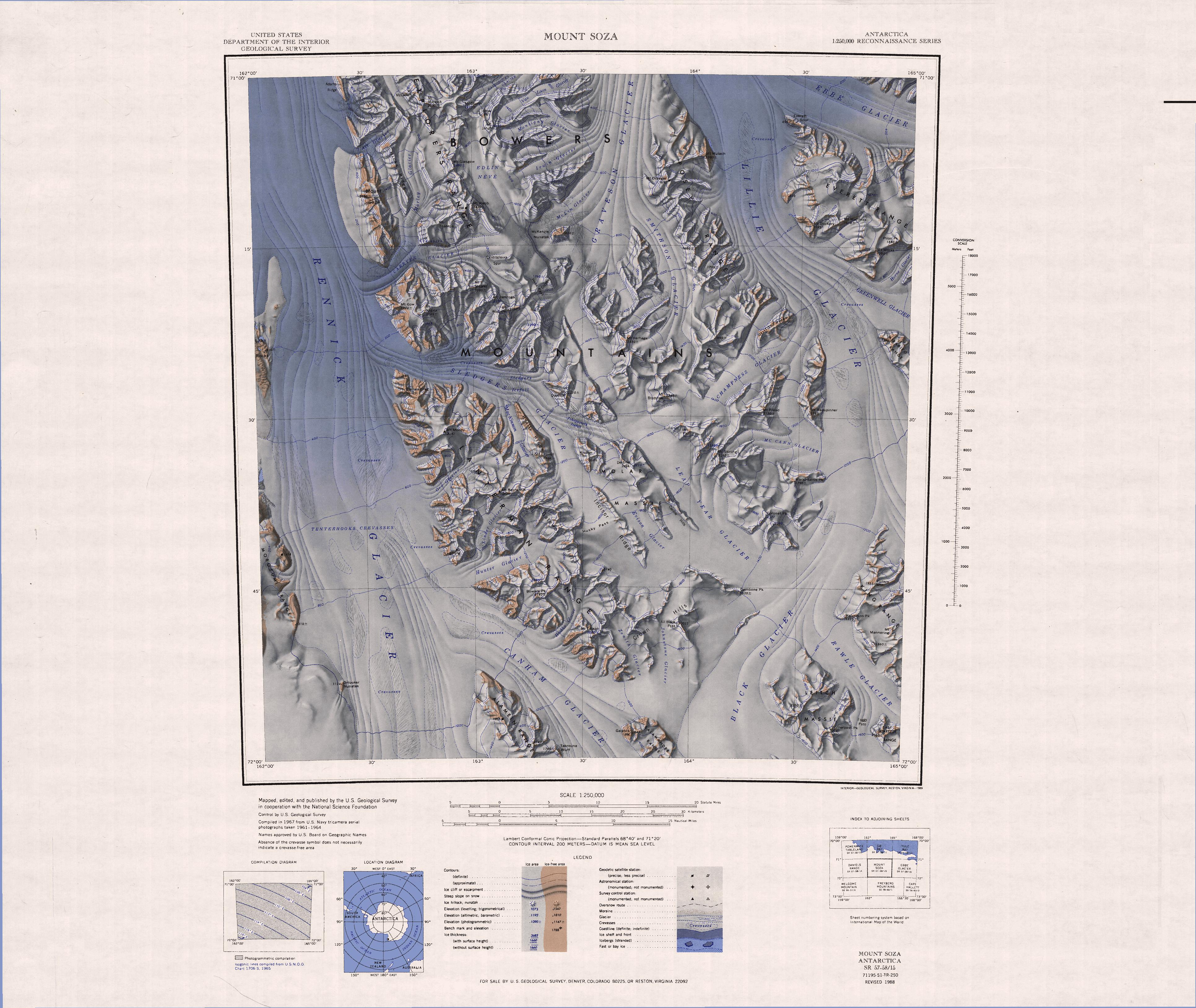
Southern part of the range

The Bowers Mountains extend north into the Pacific Ocean. The Stuhlinger Ice Piedmont is at the northern end of the mountains. The Explorers Range runs along the northwest side of the range beside the Rennick Glacier. Further south the Lanterman Range runs along the side of the Rennick Glacier and its tributary, the Canham Glacier, which defines the southwest limit of the range. The Alamein Range and Salamander Range are further south. The Crown Hills form the southern tip of the range, between the Canham Glacier and the Black Glacier to the east, which flows north to join the Lillie Glacier to the east of the Mount Sterling massif. The Molar Massif is between the Lanterman Range and the Mount Sterling massif. Further north, the Posey Range forms the eastern edge of the Bowers Mountains, with the Lillie Glacier to its east.

== Major glaciers ==
- Rennick Glacier (70°30′S 160°45′E), a broad glacier, nearly 200 nautical miles (370 km; 230 mi) long, which is one of the largest in Antarctica. It rises on the polar plateau westward of Mesa Range and is 20 to 30 nautical miles (37 to 56 km; 23 to 35 mi) wide, narrowing to 10 nautical miles (19 km; 12 mi) near the coast.
- Canham Glacier (71°49′S 163°00′E), a tributary glacier about 30 nautical miles (56 km; 35 mi) long which drains the northwest part of Evans Névé. The glacier drains northwest between the Alamein Range and Salamander Range and enters the Rennick Glacier westward of Bowers Peak.
- Black Glacier (71°40′S 164°42′E), a broad tributary to the Lillie Glacier flowing northeast, marking the southeast extent of the Bowers Mountains.
- Lillie Glacier (70°45′S 163°55′E), a large glacier in Antarctica, about 100 nautical miles (190 km; 120 mi) long and 10 nautical miles (19 km; 12 mi) wide. It lies between the Bowers Mountains on the west and the Concord Mountains and Anare Mountains on the east, flowing to Ob' Bay on the coast and forming the Lillie Glacier Tongue.

== Features ==
Geographical features include:

- Explorers Range (70°50′S 162°45′E), a large mountain range, extending from Mount Bruce in the north to Carryer Glacier and McLin Glacier in the south.
- Posey Range (71°12′S 164°0′E), a mountain range in eastern Bowers Mountains, bounded by the Smithson Glacier, Graveson Glacier, Lillie Glacier and Champness Glacier.
- Lanterman Range (71°40′S 163°10′E), a mountain range about 35 nautical miles (65 km; 40 mi) long and 12 nautical miles (22 km; 14 mi) wide, forming the southwest part of the Bowers Mountains.
- Crown Hills (71°48′S 163°57′E), a group of peaks and hills forming the south-east part of the Lanterman Range.
- Molar Massif (71°38′S 163°45′E), a large mountain massif immediately east of the Lanterman Range.
- Mount Stirling (71°33′S 164°07′E), a mountain, 2,260 metres (7,410 ft) high.

== Sources ==
- Alberts, Fred G., ed. (1995), Geographic Names of the Antarctic (PDF) (2 ed.), United States Board on Geographic Names This article incorporates public domain material from websites or documents of the United States Board on Geographic Names.
- Mount Soza, USGS: United States Geographic Board
- Ob' Bay, USGS: United States Geographic Board

This article incorporates public domain material from websites or documents of the United States Geological Survey.
