= Lillie Glacier =

Glacier in Antarctica

- Location within Antarctica
- Type: Outlet glacier
- Location: East Antarctica
- Coordinates: 70°45′S 163°55′E
- Terminus: Southern Ocean

Lillie Glacier (70°45′S 163°55′E) is a large glacier in Antarctica, about 100 nautical miles (190 km; 120 mi) long and 10 nautical miles (19 km; 12 mi) wide. It lies between the Bowers Mountains on the west and the Concord Mountains and Anare Mountains on the east, flowing to Ob' Bay on the coast and forming the Lillie Glacier Tongue.

== Discovery and naming ==
The glacier tongue was discovered by the British Antarctic Expedition, 1910–13, and was named by the expedition for Dennis G. Lillie, a biologist on the Terra Nova. The name Lillie has since been extended to the entire glacier. The lower half of the glacier was plotted by the Australian National Antarctic Research Expedition (ANARE) (Thala Dan) in 1962, which explored the area and utilized air photos taken by United States Navy Operation Highjump, 1946–47. The whole feature was mapped by the United States Geological Survey (USGS) from surveys and United States Navy air photos, 1960–62.

On 22 October 1964 a United States Navy ski-equipped LC-47 airplane flew from Hallett Station to establish a cache of fuel drums on Lillie Glacier for army helicopters to use when supporting a scientific party later in the season. After unloading the drums and taking off, the plane developed engine trouble and was forced to land on the glacier again. There were no serious injuries.

== Course ==
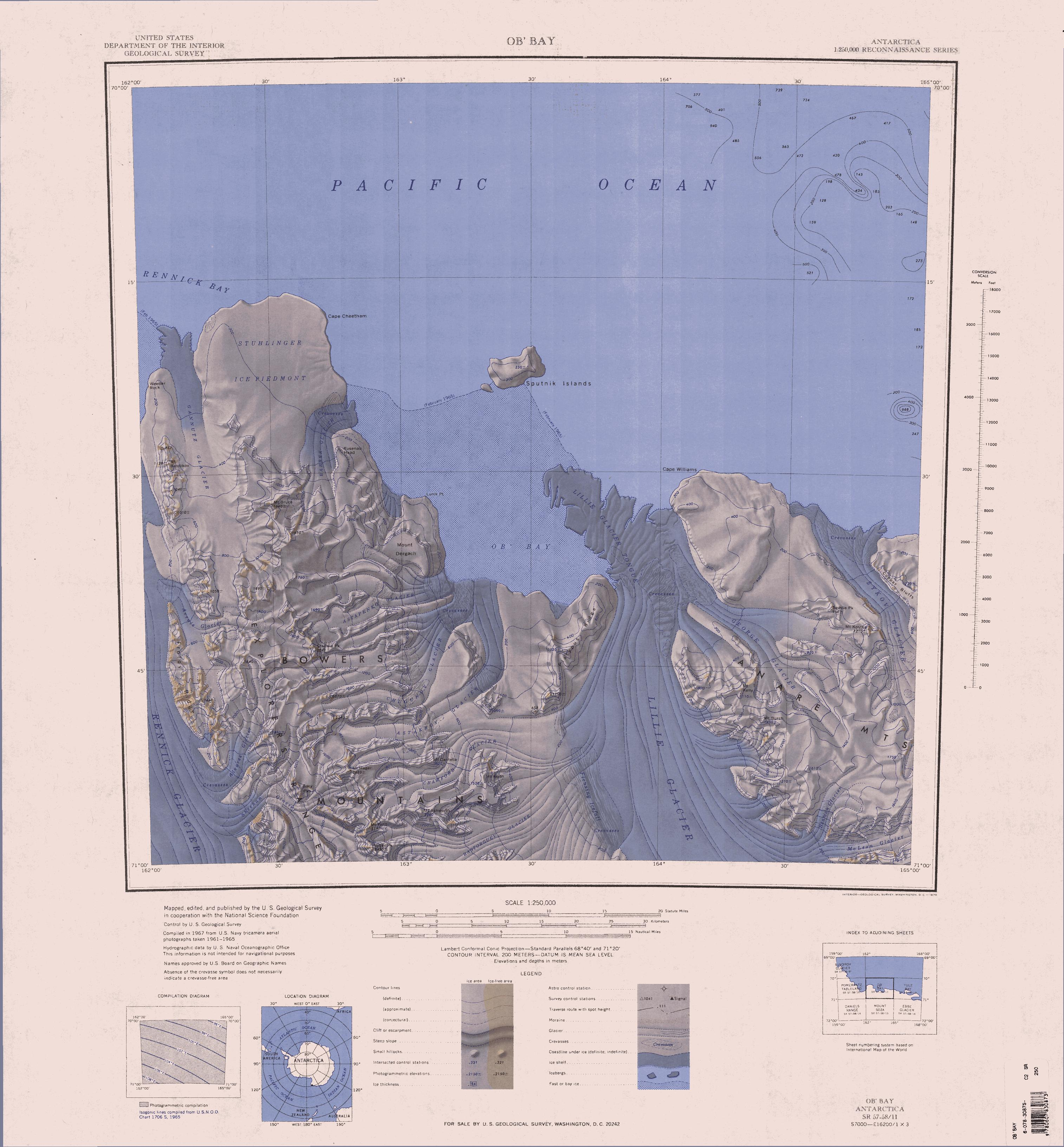
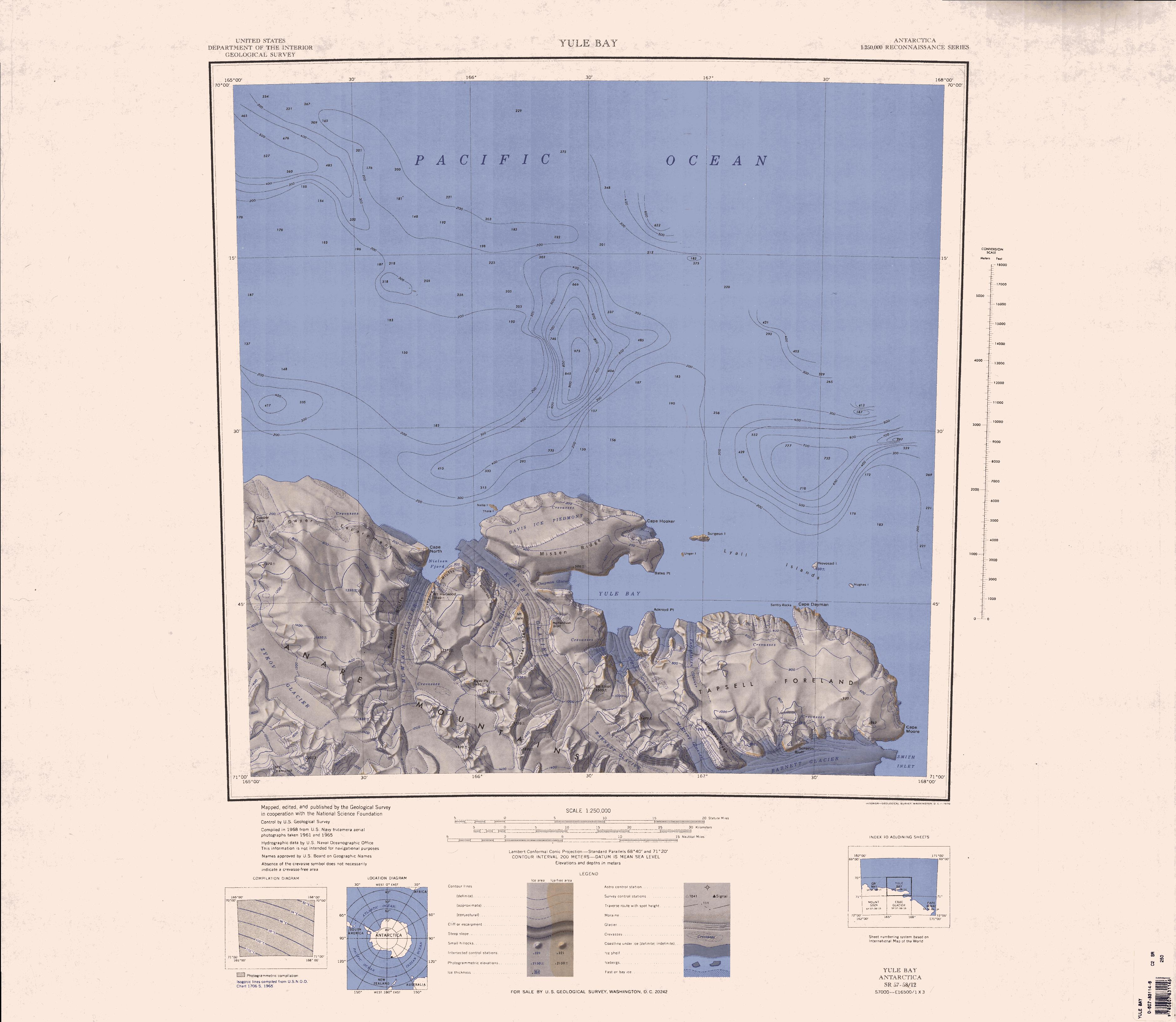
Mouth of the glacier
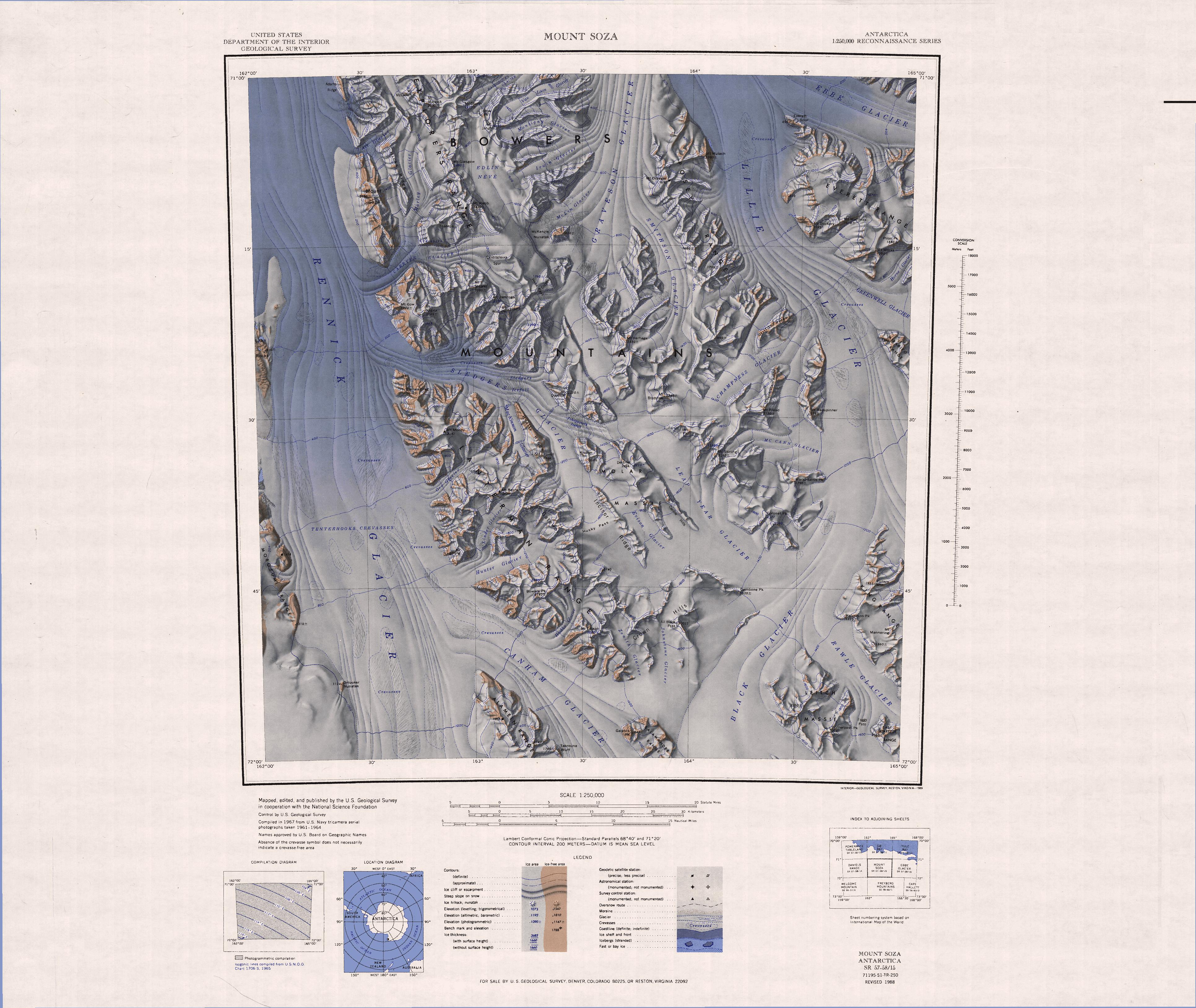
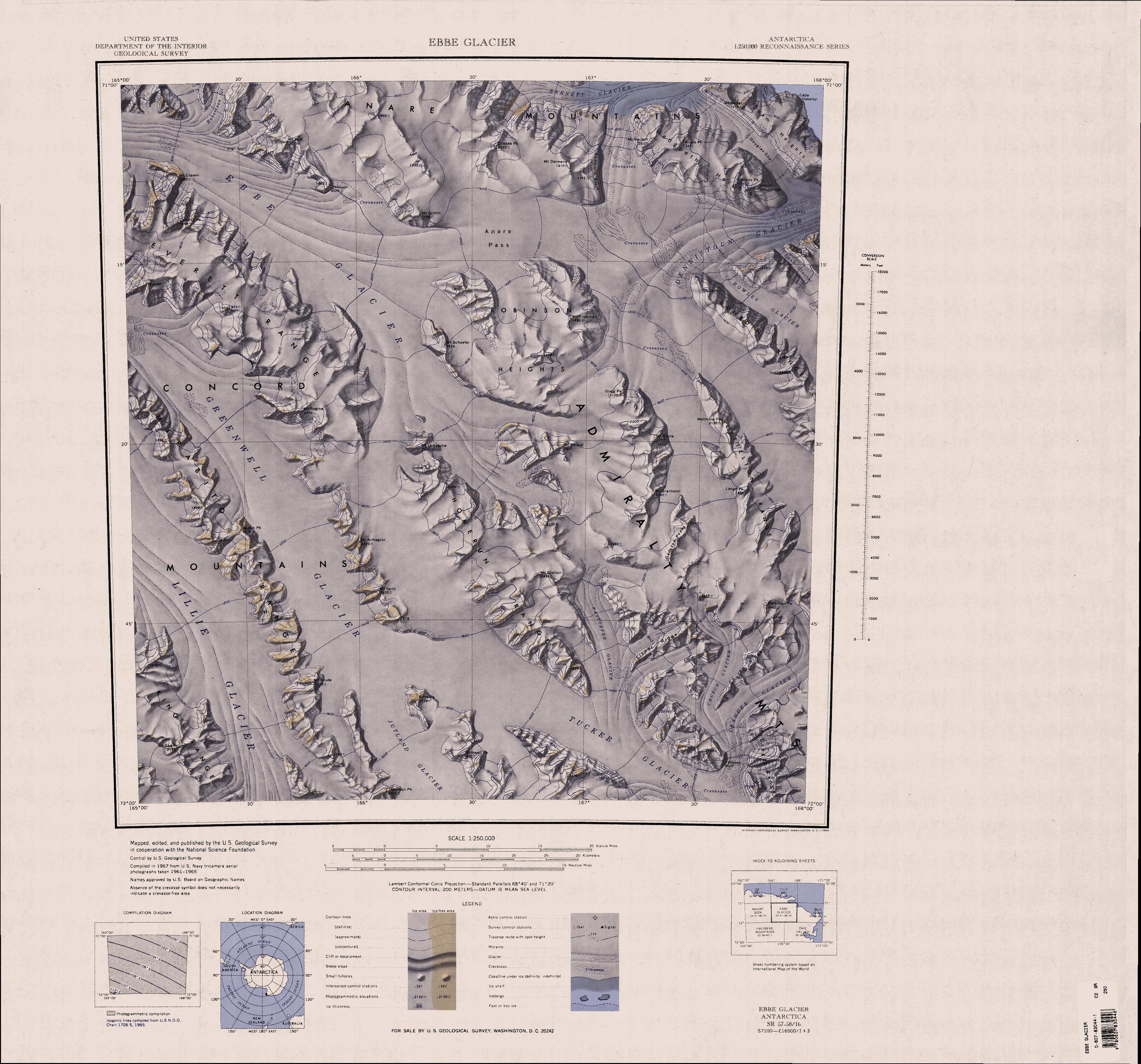
Middle reaches
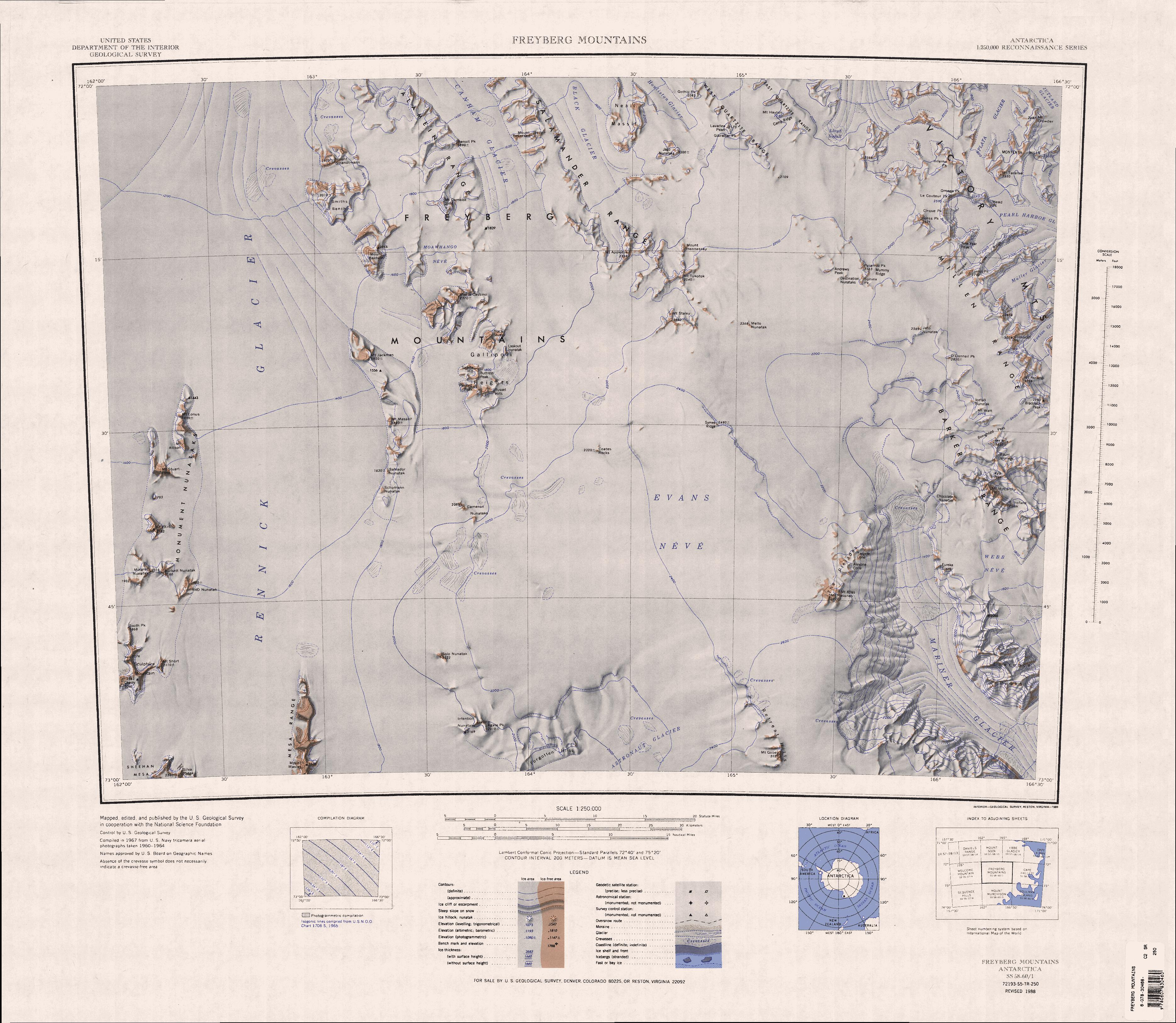
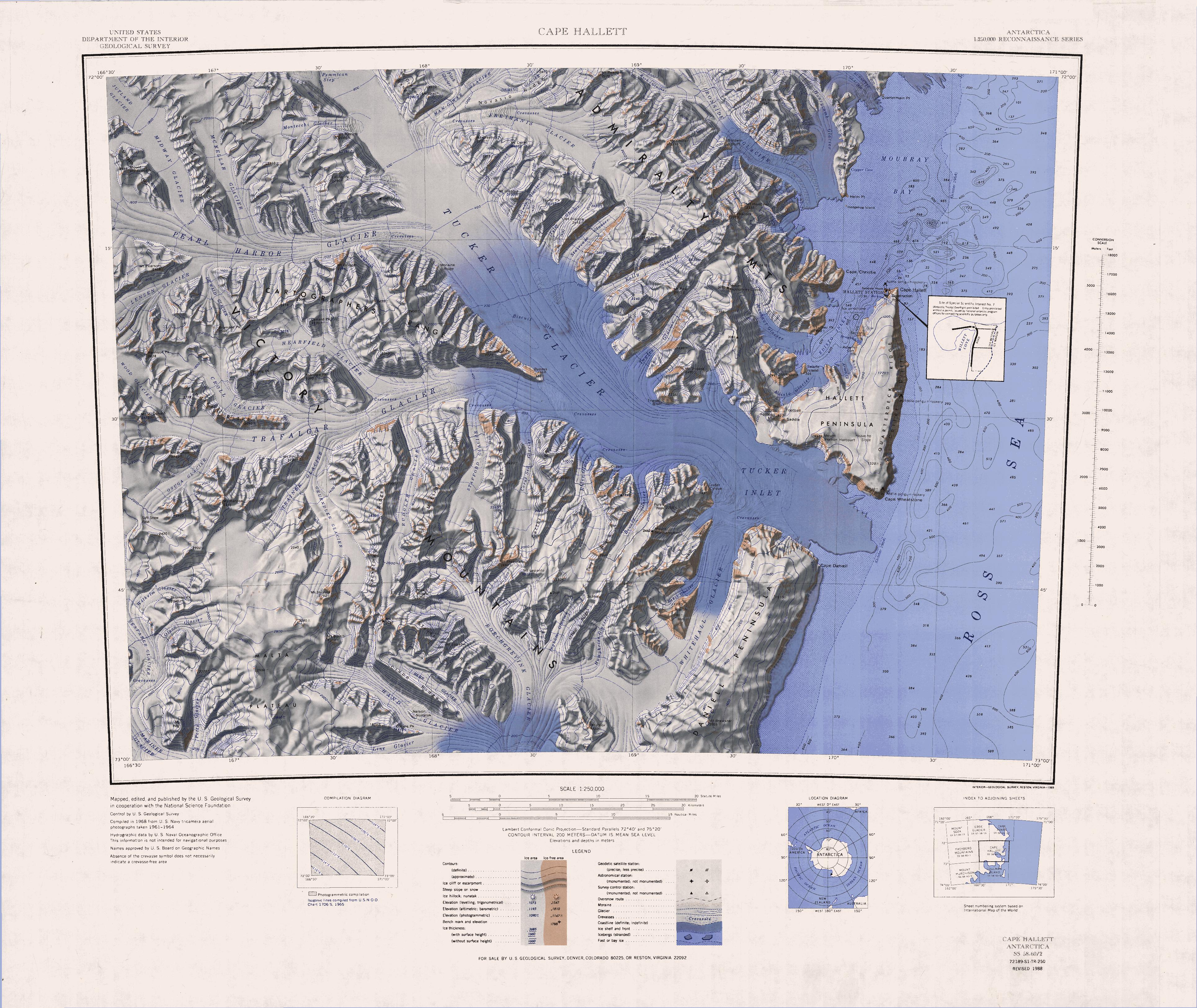
Upper reaches

The Lillie Glacier forms below the Evans Névé, fed by the Lloyd Icefall to the east of the East Quartzite Range and southwest of the Victory Mountains. It flows north through the Concord Mountains between the King Range to the west and the Mirabito Range to the east. To the north of Toilers Mountain in the King Range it is joined by Black Glacier from the west, and then by McCann Glacier north of Markinsenis Peak. The Black Glacier forms between the Salamander Range and the Neall Massif and flows north. Houliston Glacier joins Black Glacier from the east to the south of the Leitch Massif. Rawle Glacier joins it from the east to the north of the Leitch Massif. The Black Glacier is joined from the west by Leap Year Glacier before joining Lille Glacier.

North of Mount Radspinner the Lillie Glacier is joined by Champness Glacier from the west, and then at the north end of the Mirabito Range by the Greenwell Glacier from the east. The Greenwell Glacier forms and flows northeast between the Mirabito Range to the west and the Homerun Range to the east. At its head it is joined to the Jutland Glacier and Plata Glacier. Just before entering the Lillie Glacier it is joined from the east by the Horne Glacier. The Lillie Glacier flow north between the Posey Range to the west and the Everett Range to the east. Past Everett Spur it is joined from the east by the Ebbe Glacier. The Ebbe Glacier forms to the east of the Homerun Range and flows northwest and then west between the Everett Range to the southwest and the Anare Mountains to the northeast. It is fed from the Anare Mountains by Robertson Glacier, which enters from the north.

The Lillie Glacier is then joined from the east by the McLean Glacier, the Beaman Glacier and the George Glacier flowing from the Anare Mountains. The George Glacier flows into the Lillie Glacier Tongue. Before reaching its mouth on the west the Lillie Glacier flows north west past the Flensing Icefall. This is fed by the Graveson Glacier from the north. The Graveson Glacier forms west of Mount Verhage and flows north between the Explorers Range and the Posey Range. It is joined by the Smithson Glacier from the east and the McLin Glacier, Irwin Glacier, Montigny Glacier and Van Loon Glacier from the west. The McLin and Irwin glaciers are both fed by the Edlin Névé. The Lillie Glacier is also fed by the Rastorguey Glacier and the Crawford Glacier from the west.

== Right tributaries ==
Tributaries from the right (east) are, from south to north,

=== Lloyd Icefall ===
72°04′S 165°27′E. A large icefall at the head of Lillie Glacier, draining from the polar plateau between the King Range and the Millen Range. Named by the Northern Party of New Zealand Federated Mountain Clubs Antarctic Expedition (NZFMCAE), 1962–63, for R. Lloyd, field assistant with the Southern Party of that expedition.

=== Greenwell Glacier ===
71°20′S 165°00′E. A major tributary glacier, 45 nautical miles (83 km; 52 mi) long, draining northwest between Mirabito Range and Everett Range to enter Lillie Glacier below Mount Works. Mapped by United States Geological Survey (USGS) from surveys and United States Navy aerial photography, 1960–63. Named by United States Advisory Committee on Antarctic Names (US-ACAN) for Commander Martin D. Greenwell, United States Navy, Commander of Antarctic Squadron Six (VX-6), 1961–62.

=== Jutland Glacier ===
71°55′S 166°12′E. A broad tributary glacier, 15 nautical miles (28 km; 17 mi) long and 4 nautical miles (7.4 km; 4.6 mi) wide, in the Victory Mountains. It drains northwest from a common divide with Midway Glacier to join the flow of the Greenwell Glacier northwest of Boss Peak. Mapped by USGS from surveys and United States Navy aerial photographs, 1960–63. Named by the northern party of NZFMCAE which explored the area, 1962–63, to continue the sequence of features in the vicinity named after famous battles.

=== Plata Glacier ===
72°04′S 166°11′E. A glacier in the Victory Mountains, flowing north between Mirabito Range and Monteath Hills into Jutland Glacier. One of several features in the Victory Mountains named after naval encounters, this glacier named after the naval battle of the Rio de la Plata, December 1939. Named by the New Zealand Antarctic Place Names Committee (NZ-APC) on the suggestion of R.H. Findlay, New Zealand Antarctic Research Programme (NZARP) geologist to this area, 1981–82.

=== Horne Glacier ===
71°17′S 164°56′E. A valley glacier, 6 nautical miles (11 km; 6.9 mi) long, draining southwest from the Everett Range between Mount Works and Mount Calvin and entering the lower part of Greenwell Glacier. Mapped by USGS from surveys and United States Navy air photos, 1960–62. Named by US-ACAN for Lieutenant Robert P. Horne, United States Navy Reserve, pilot of C-130 aircraft on photographic flights in Operation Deep Freeze 1968 and 1969.

=== Ebbe Glacier ===
71°03′S 164°45′E. A tributary glacier about 60 nautical miles (110 km; 69 mi) long, draining northwest from the Homerun Range and Robinson Heights, and then WNW between Everett Range and Anare Mountains into Lillie Glacier. This feature saddles with Tucker Glacier, the latter draining southeast to the Ross Sea. Mapped by USGS from surveys and air photos by United States Navy Squadron VX-6, 1960–62. Named by US-ACAN for Commander Gordon K. Ebbe, commanding officer of Squadron VX-6 from June 1955 to June 1956.

=== Robertson Glacier ===
71°03′S 165°23′E. Tributary glacier that flows south from Anare Mountains and enters Ebbe Glacier east of Springtail Bluff. Mapped by USGS from surveys and United States Navy aerial photography, 1960–63. Named by US-ACAN for John W. Robertson, photographer's mate with United States Navy Squadron VX-6 at McMurdo Station, 1967–68 and 1968–69.

=== McLean Glacier ===
70°59′S 164°45′E. Tributary glacier located north of Mount Hemphill in the southwest part of Anare Mountains, draining west and entering the lower part of Ebbe Glacier just south of Beaman Glacier. Named by US-ACAN for Kenneth S. McLean, topographic engineer with the USGS Topo East-West party that surveyed this area in the 1962–63 season.

=== Beaman Glacier ===
70°58′S 164°38′E. A tributary to Ebbe Glacier lying close north of McLean Glacier in the southwest part of Anare Mountains. Named by US-ACAN for First Lieutenant Charles W. Beaman, USA, helicopter pilot who flew missions in support of the USGS Topo West survey of this area in the 1962–63 season.

=== George Glacier ===
70°41′S 164°15′E. A valley glacier in the west part of Anare Mountains. It rises east of Mount Burch and flows northwest past Mount Kelly to Lillie Glacier Tongue on the coast. Mapped by USGS from surveys and United States Navy air photos, 1960–65. Named by US-ACAN for Robert Y. George, zoologist at McMurdo Station, 1967–68.

== Left tributaries ==
Tributaries from the left (west) are, from south to north,

=== Black Glacier ===
71°40′S 164°42′E. A broad tributary to the Lillie Glacier flowing northeast, marking the southeast extent of the Bowers Mountains. Mapped by USGS from ground surveys and United States Navy air photos, 1960–62. Named by US-ACAN for Robert F. Black, geologist, University of Wisconsin, project leader for Antarctic patterned ground studies, who carried out research in the McMurdo Sound region during several summer seasons in the 1960s.

=== Houliston Glacier ===
72°00′S 164°34′E. A tributary glacier between Neall Massif and West Quartzite Range, flowing northwest into Black Glacier. Named by the New Zealand Geological Survey Antarctic Expedition (NZGSAE), 1967–68, for R. Houliston, electrician at Scott Base, 1967–68.

=== Rawle Glacier ===
71°50′S 164°40′E. A tributary glacier in the Concord Mountains, flowing northwest between Leitch Massif and King Range into the Black Glacier. Named by the northern party of NZGSAE, 1963–64, for Russell Rawle, leader at Scott Base, 1964.

=== Leap Year Glacier ===
71°42′S 164°15′E. A tributary glacier between Molar Massif and Mount Stirling in the Bowers Mountains, draining southeast into Black Glacier. So named by the northern party of NZGSAE, 1963–64, as party members arrived here in the new year of 1964 after climbing out of the Sledgers Glacier.

=== McCann Glacier ===
71°33′S 164°33′E. A tributary glacier which drains the east slopes of Mount Stirling in the Bowers Mountains and flows east between Mount Radspinner and Markinsenis Peak into the Lillie Glacier. Mapped by USGS from surveys and United States Navy air photos, 1960–64. Named by US-ACAN for Chief Utilitiesman J.M. McCann, United States Navy. McCann was a member of the McMurdo Station winter party in 1962 and took part in summer support activities, 1963–65.

=== Champness Glacier ===
71°25′S 164°22′E. A tributary glacier, 15 nautical miles (28 km; 17 mi) long, draining northeast from the vicinity of Ian Peak in the Bowers Mountains and entering Lillie Glacier at Griffith Ridge. Named by the NZGSAE to northern Victoria Land, 1967–68, for Grahame Champness, field assistant with that party.

=== Flensing Icefall ===
70°55′S 163°44′E. A large icefall at the east side of the Bowers Mountains, situated south of Platypus Ridge at the junction of the Graveson Glacier and the Rastorguev Glacier with the Lillie Glacier. So named by the northern party of NZGSAE, 1963–64, because the icefall's longitudinal system of parallel crevassing resembles the carcass of a whale when being flensed.

=== McLin Glacier ===
71°12′S 163°27′E. A tributary glacier which flows north of McKenzie Nunatak into Graveson Glacier, in the Bowers Mountains. The glacier saddles with Carryer Glacier on the west and is nourished in part by Edlin Névé. Named by the NZGSAE to this area, 1967–68, for Lieutenant Commander Robert D. McLin, United States Navy, pilot of Hercules LC-130 aircraft in Antarctica that season.

=== McKenzie Nunatak ===
71°14′S 163°25′E. A very prominent nunatak 1,620 metres (5,310 ft) which rises above the ice between McLin Glacier and Graveson Glacier, in the Bowers Mountains. Mapped by USGS from ground surveys and U.S. Navy air photos, 1960–62. Named by US-ACAN for Carry D. McKenzie, glaciologist, who participated in the study of Meserve Glacier in 1966–67.

=== Graveson Glacier ===
71°00′S 163°45′E. A broad north-flowing tributary to the Lillie Glacier, draining that portion of the Bowers Mountains between the Posey Range and the southern part of Explorers Range. The feature is fed by several lesser tributaries and enters Lillie Glacier via Flensing Icefalls. Named by the northern party of NZGSAE, 1963–64, for F. Graveson, mining engineer, who wintered at Scott Base in 1963 and was field assistant on this expedition.

=== Smithson Glacier ===
71°15′S 163°52′E. A tributary glacier in the Bowers Mountains. It drains the slopes near Mount Verhage and flows north along the west side of Posey Range to enter Graveson Glacier adjacent to Mount Draeger. Mapped by USGS from ground surveys and United States Navy air photos, 1960–62. Named by US-ACAN for Scott B. Smithson, geologist at McMurdo Station, 1967–68.

=== Irwin Glacier ===
71°07′S 163°25′E. A steep tributary glacier in the Bowers Mountains, draining northeast from Edlin Névé and at the terminus coalescing with Montigny Glacier (from the north), with which it enters the larger Graveson Glacier. Mapped by USGS from surveys and United States Navy air photos, 1960–64. Named by US-ACAN for Carlisle S. Irwin, glaciologist, who participated in the study of Meserve Glacier in 1966–67.

=== Montigny Glacier ===
71°05′S 163°24′E. A steep tributary glacier in the Bowers Mountains, flowing eastward and at the terminus coalescing with Irwin Glacier (from the south), with which it enters the larger Graveson Glacier. Mapped by USGS from surveys and United States Navy air photos, 1960–64. Named by US-ACAN for Raymond J. Montigny, glaciologist, who participated in the study of Meserve Glacier in 1966–67.

=== Van Loon Glacier ===
71°01′S 163°24′E. A tributary glacier, 7 nautical miles (13 km; 8.1 mi) long, draining the eastern slopes of the Bowers Mountains between Rasturguev Glacier and Montigny Glacier. It merges into the larger Graveson Glacier at the east margin of the mountains. Mapped by USGS from surveys and United States Navy aerial photography, 1960–62. Named by US-ACAN for meteorologist Harry van Loon, a member of the Antarctic Weather Central team at Little America on the Ross Ice Shelf 1957–58, who has written numerous scientific papers dealing with Antarctic and southern hemisphere atmospheric research.

=== Edlin Névé ===
71°10′S 163°06′E. A névé at the south side of Mount Sturm in the Bowers Mountains. Several glaciers, including the Carryer Glacier, Irwin Glacier, McLin Glacier and Graveson Glacier, are nourished by this névé. Named by NZGSAE, 1967–68, for G. Edlin, who served as postmaster at Scott Base and assisted in the field during this expedition.

=== Rastorguey Glacier ===
70°57′S 163°30′E. Large tributary glacier which drains the east slopes of the Explorers Range between Mount Ford and Mount Sturm and joins Lillie Glacier via Flensing Icefall. Mapped by USGS from surveys and United States Navy air photos, 1960–62. Named by US-ACAN after Vladimir I. Rastorguev, Soviet IGY observer, a Weather Central meteorologist at Little America V in 1957.

=== Crawford Glacier ===
70°53′S 163°13′E. A tributary glacier which drains the east slopes of Explorers Range between Mount Hager and Mount Ford. It descends east to join Lillie Glacier south of Platypus Ridge. Mapped by USGS from surveys and United States Navy air photos, 1960–65. Named by US-ACAN after Douglas I. Crawford, biologist at McMurdo Station, 1965–66.

== Sources ==
- Alberts, Fred G., ed. (1995), Geographic Names of the Antarctic (PDF) (2 ed.), United States Board on Geographic Names This article incorporates public domain material from websites or documents of the United States Board on Geographic Names.
- Ebbe Glacier, USGS: United States Geological Survey, 1967
- Freyberg Mountains, USGS: United States Geological Survey, 1967
- Mount Soza, USGS: United States Geological Survey, 1967
- Ob' Bay, USGS: United States Geological Survey
- Reedy, James R. (November 1964), Bulletin of the U.S. Antarctic Projects Officer, vol. VI

This article incorporates public domain material from websites or documents of the United States Geological Survey.
