= Takeshi Nagata =

Japanese astronomer

Takeshi Nagata (永田 武, Nagata Takeshi; June 24, 1913 – June 3, 1991) was a Japanese geophysicist. He studied geomagnetism.

He won the Gold Medal of the Royal Astronomical Society in 1987. Mount Nagata in Antarctica is named after him.
