= Everett Range =

Mountain range in Victoria Land, Antarctica

- Location within Antarctica

Geography
- Continent: Antarctica
- Area: Victoria Land
- Range coordinates: 71°20′S 165°40′E
- Parent range: Concord Mountains

The Everett Range (71°20′S 165°40′E) is a rugged, mainly ice-covered range nearly 60 nautical miles (110 km; 69 mi) long between Greenwell Glacier and Ebbe Glacier in northwest Victoria Land, Antarctica.

== Discovery and naming ==
The Everett Range was mapped by the United States Geological Survey (USGS) from ground surveys and aerial photographs taken by the United States Navy in the period 1960–63. It was named by the United States Advisory Committee on Antarctic Names (US-ACAN) for Commander William H. Everett, U.S. Navy, Commander of Antarctic Squadron Six (VX-6), 1962–63.

== Location ==
The Everett Range is in the Concord Mountains. Everett Spur is the northwest point, where the Ebbe Glacier meets the Lillie Glacier, which flows north along the west of the range. Mount Dockery, Mount Matthias, Pilon Peak and Mount Works are in the northwest section, west of the Horne Glacier, which flows south into the Greenwell Glacier where it joins the Lillie Glacier. The Greenwell Glacier separates the Everett Range from the Mirabito Range to the southwest. The southeastern part of the range extends southeast between the Ebbe Glacier to the northeast and the Greenwell Glacier to the southwest. Robinson Heights and the Homerun Range of the Admiralty Mountains are to its east and southeast. Features of the southeastern part include Mount Craven, Cantrell Peak, Mount Calvin and Mount Regina.

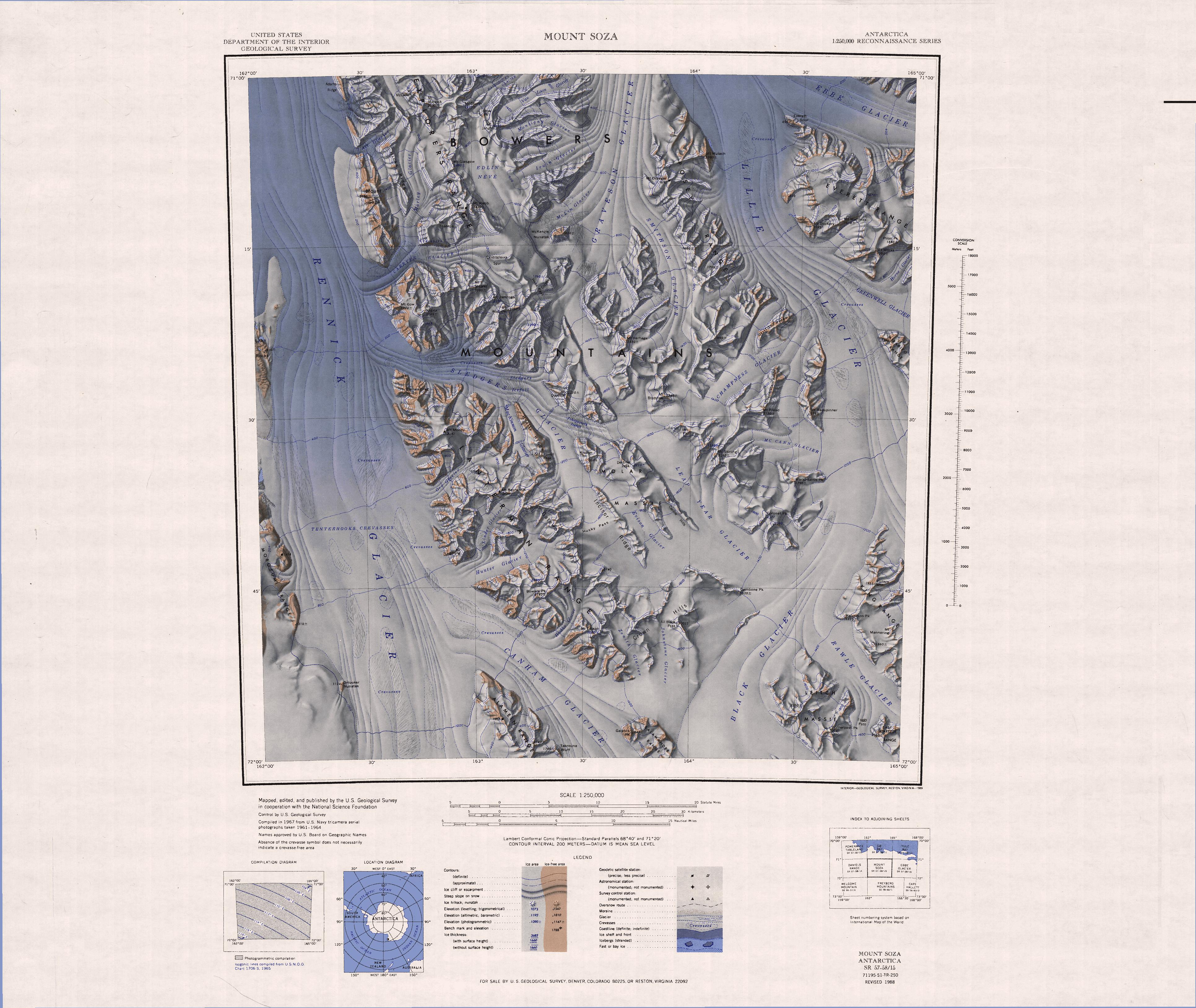
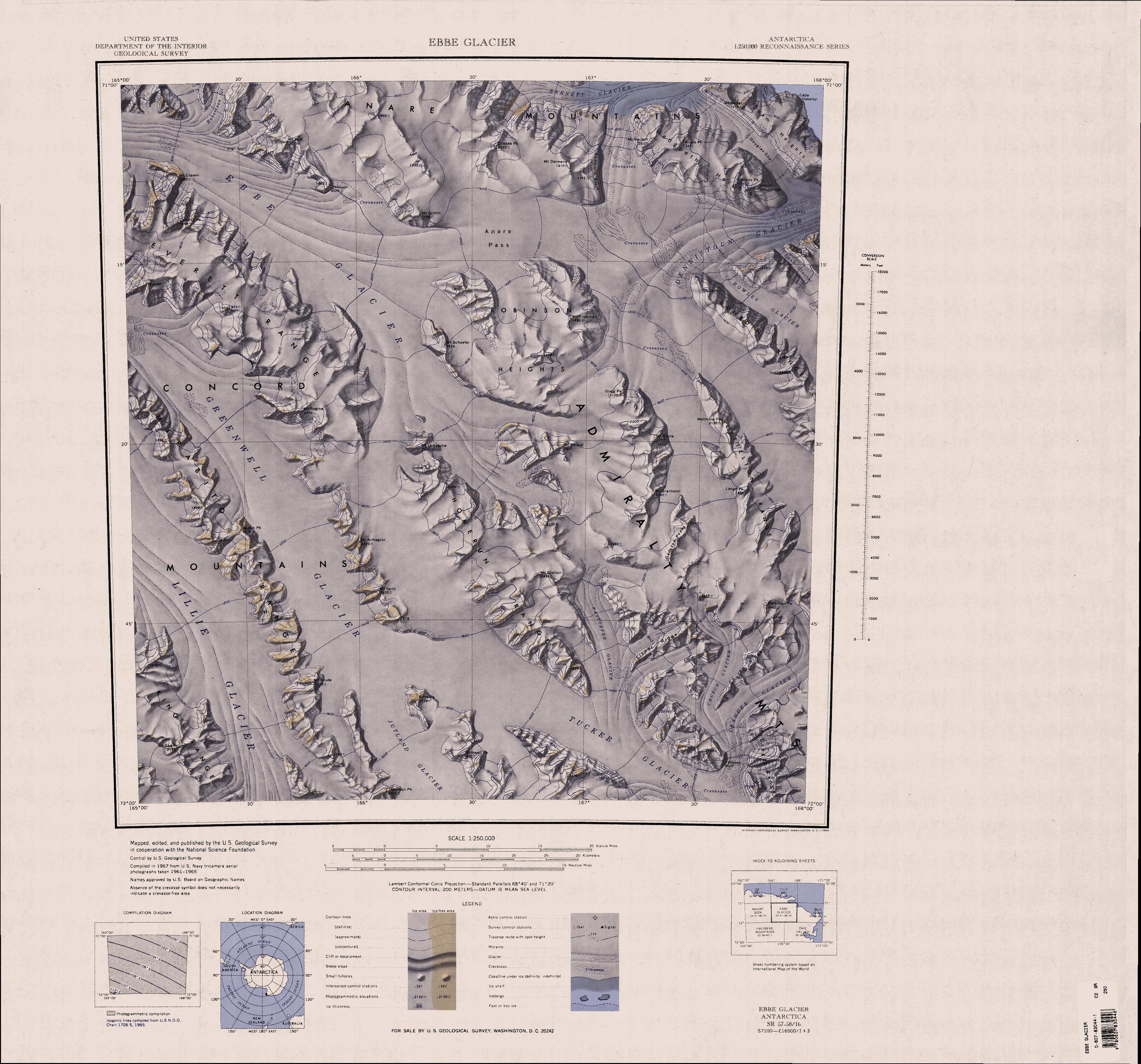
Everett Range in northeast of left map, northwest of the right map

== Features ==
=== Everett Spur ===
71°05′S 164°30′E. A prominent rock spur which marks the northwest end of Everett Range and the junction of Ebbe Glacier with the Lillie Glacier. Mapped by USGS from surveys and United States Navy air photos, 1960–62. Named by US-ACAN for Kaye R. Everett, geologist at McMurdo Station, 1967–68, and at Livingston Island, 1968–69.

=== Mount Dockery ===
71°13′S 164°33′E. A mountain, 1,095 metres (3,593 ft) high, standing 3 nautical miles (5.6 km; 3.5 mi) west of Mount Matthias in the west part of Everett Range. Mapped by USGS from surveys and United States Navy air photos, 1960–62. Named by US-ACAN for Lieutenant Olan L. Dockery, United States Navy Squadron VX-6, pilot who flew photographic flights in northern Victoria Land, Queen Maud Mountains, Britannia Range and the McMurdo Sound area in the 1962–63 and 1963–64 seasons.

=== Mount Matthias ===
71°13′S 164°41′E. A mountain 1,610 metres (5,280 ft) high rising 2 nautical miles (3.7 km; 2.3 mi) east-northeast of Mount Dockery. Mapped by USGS from surveys and United States Navy air photos, 1960–64. Named by US-ACAN for Lieutenant Commander Jack M. Matthias, United States Navy, maintenance officer and aircraft commander with Squadron VX-6 in Operation Deep Freeze 1968 and 1969.

=== Pilon Peak ===
71°14′S 164°57′E. A prominent peak 1,880 metres (6,170 ft) high standing 2 nautical miles (3.7 km; 2.3 mi) northeast of Mount Works along the west side of Horne Glacier. Mapped by USGS from ground surveys and United States Navy air photos, 1960–62. Named by US-ACAN for Commander Jerome R. Pilon, United States Navy, Operations Officer of Antarctic Development Squadron Six (1967–68), Executive Officer (1968–69), and Commanding Officer (1969–70). Commander Pilon served on the Advisory Committee on Antarctic Names of the United States Board on Geographic Names, 1976–78.

=== Mount Works ===
71°15′S 164°50′E. A mountain, 1,780 metres (5,840 ft) high, rising just west of Home Glacier and 2 nautical miles (3.7 km; 2.3 mi) southwest of Pilon Peak. Mapped by USGS from ground surveys and United States Navy air photos, 1960–62. Named by US-ACAN for Lieutenant W.W. Works, United States Navy, pilot of P2V aircraft on photographic missions in Victoria Land and other parts of Antarctica in 1961-62 and 1962–63.

=== Mount Craven ===
71°08′S 165°15′E. A projecting type mountain 1,500 metres (4,900 ft) high in the north part of Everett Range. The feature stands 4 nautical miles (7.4 km; 4.6 mi) north of Cantrell Peak and overlooks Ebbe Glacier from the south. Mapped by USGS from surveys and United States Navy aerial photographs, 1960–63. Named by US-ACAN for Lieutenant Commander Alexander T. Craven, United States Navy, pilot of R4D aircraft in support of the USGS Topo West survey of this area in 1962–63. He returned to Antarctica, 1963–64.

=== Cantrell Peak ===
71°12′S 165°14′E. A peak 1,895 metres (6,217 ft) high standing 6 nautical miles (11 km; 6.9 mi) north-northeast of Mount Calvin and overlooking Ebbe Glacier from the south, in the north part of Everett Range. Mapped by USGS from surveys and United States Navy aerial photographs, 1960–63. Named by US-ACAN for Major Robert L. Cantrell, USMC, pilot on photographic flights in C-130 aircraft during Operation Deep Freeze 1968 and 1969.

=== Mount Calvin ===
71°17′S 165°06′E. A mountain over 1,600 metres (5,200 ft) high, standing 4 nautical miles (7.4 km; 4.6 mi) southeast of Pilon Peak in the south part of Everett Range. Mapped by USGS from surveys and United States Navy aerial photographs, 1960–63. Named for Lieutenant Calvin Luther Larsen, United States Navy, navigator and photographic officer of United States Navy Squadron VX-6 during Operation Deep Freeze 1969; as a chief photographer's mate, he wintered at Little America V in 1957. Lieutenant Larsen's first name was applied by US-ACAN to avoid a further overuse of the surname Larsen in Antarctic geographic names.

=== Mount Regina ===
71°27′S 165°45′E. Mountain 2,080 metres (6,820 ft) high standing 10 nautical miles (19 km; 12 mi) west-northwest of Mount LeResche in the south part of Everett Range. Mapped by USGS from surveys and United States Navy photography, 1960–63. Named by US-ACAN for Thomas J. Regina, Photographer's Mate, United States Navy, on C-130 aircraft flights in the 1968–69 season. He was a member of the McMurdo Station winter party in 1963.

== Sources ==
- Alberts, Fred G., ed. (1995), Geographic Names of the Antarctic (PDF) (2 ed.), United States Board on Geographic Names This article incorporates public domain material from websites or documents of the United States Board on Geographic Names.
- Ebbe Glacier, USGS: United States Geographic Board
- Mount Soza, USGS: United States Geographic Board
