= Molar Massif =

Mountain in Antarctica

- Location within Antarctica

Geography
- Continent: Antarctica
- Region(s): Victoria Land, Antarctica
- Range coordinates: 71°38′S 163°45′E

Molar Massif (71°38′S 163°45′E) is a large mountain massif immediately east of the Lanterman Range in the Bowers Mountains of Antarctica. It was mapped by the United States Geological Survey (USGS) from ground surveys and United States Navy air photos, 1960–1964. The descriptive name was applied by the United States Advisory Committee on Antarctic Names (US-ACAN) because, when viewed in plan, the outline of the massif resembles a molar tooth.

== Location ==
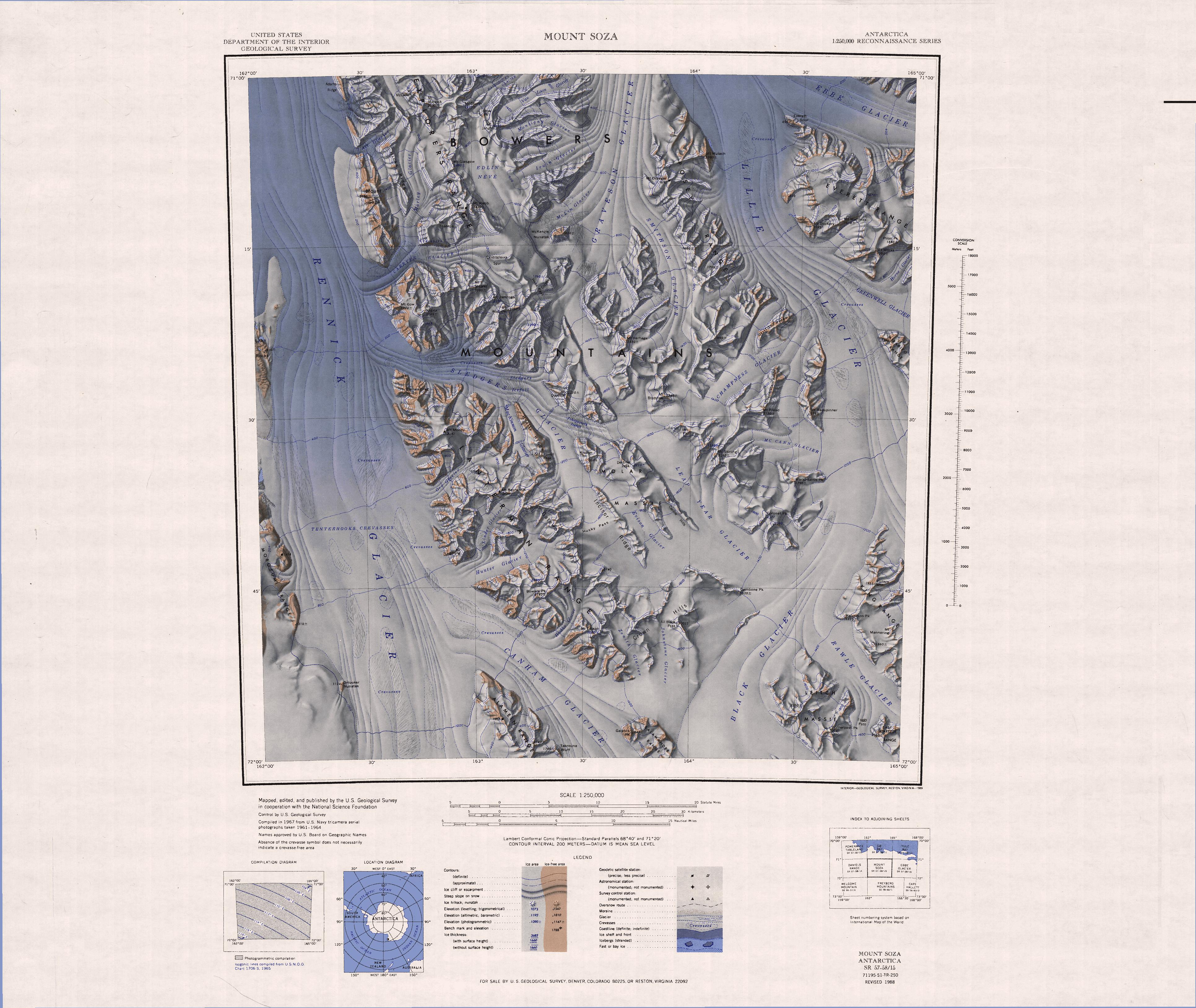
Terrain north of West Quartzite Range

The Molar Massif is bounded by the Sledgers Glacier to the west, which separates it from the Lanterman Range. To the north Tobogganers Icefall separates it from Mount Overlook. To the east Leap Year Glacier separates it from the Mount Stirling massif. The Crown Hills are to the south.

== Features ==
=== Wisdom Hills ===
71°33′S 163°33′E. A cluster of summits which rise to 2,000 metres (6,600 ft) high and form the northwest segment of Molar Massif. Named in 1983 by the New Zealand Antarctic Place-Names Committee (NZ-APC), on a proposal from geologist M.G. Laird, in association with the name Molar Massif.

=== Dentine Peak ===
71°35′S 163°44′E. The highest peak 2,210 metres (7,250 ft) high in the northeast portion of Molar Massif. Named from association with Molar Massif by geologist R.A. Cooper, leader of New Zealand Antarctic Research Programme (NZARP) paleontological parties to this area, 1974-75 and 1981-82.

=== Incisor Ridge ===
71°40′S 163°41′E. A ridge, 9 nautical miles (17 km; 10 mi) long, forming the southwest segment of Molar Massif. Named in association with Molar Massif by the NZ-APC (1983) on the proposal of geologist M.G. Laird.

=== Husky Pass ===
71°40′S 163°34′E. A pass between Lanterman Range and Molar Massif, located at the head of Sledgers Glacier and an unnamed tributary, leading to Leap Year Glacier. Named by the New Zealand Geological Survey Antarctic Expedition (NZGSAE), 1963-64, for the great efforts made here by dog teams in hauling out of the Rennick Glacier watershed into that of the Lillie Glacier.

=== Evison Glacier ===
71°41′S 163°51′E. A small glacier draining from the south end of Molar Massif in the Bowers Mountains. Named by the NZGSAE, 1967-68, for F.F. Evison, New Zealand's first professor of geophysics.

=== Canine Hills ===
71°37′S 163°50′E. A line of mostly snow-covered hills and ridges trending northwest-southeast for 11 nautical miles (20 km; 13 mi) and forming the eastern half of Molar Massif. Named by the NZ-APC in 1983 from a proposal by geologist M.G. Laird, in association with the names Molar Massif and Incisor Ridge.

== Nearby features ==
Features to the north of the massif include:

=== Mount Overlook ===
71°28′S 163°26′E. A mostly snow-covered mountain rising to about 2,010 metres (6,590 ft) high and overlooking the middle portion of Sledgers Glacier from the north. The feature was so named by M.G. Laird, leader of a NZARP geological party to the area, 1981-82, because the party obtained an excellent view from the summit.

=== Mount Bradshaw ===
71°28′S 163°52′E. A mountain peak 2,240 metres (7,350 ft) high at the northeast side of the névé of Leap Year Glacier, 4 nautical miles (7.4 km; 4.6 mi) northwest of lan Peak. Named by the NZ-APC in 1983 after John Bradshaw, geologist, University of Canterbury, N.Z., a member of NZARP geological parties to the area, 1974-75 and 1981-82.

=== Mount Verhage ===
71°23′S 163°42′E. A prominent mountain, 2,450 metres (8,040 ft) high, standing directly at the head of Smithson Glacier. Mapped by USGS from ground surveys and United States Navy air photos, 1960–62. Named by US-ACAN for Lieutenant Ronald G. Verhage, United States Navy, supply officer at McMurdo Station, winter party, 1967.

== Sources ==
- Alberts, Fred G., ed. (1995), Geographic Names of the Antarctic (PDF) (2 ed.), United States Board on Geographic Names This article incorporates public domain material from websites or documents of the United States Board on Geographic Names.
- Mount Soza, USGS: United States Geographic Board

This article incorporates public domain material from websites or documents of the United States Geological Survey.
