= Posey Range =

Mountain range in Victoria Land, Antarctica

- Location within Antarctica

Geography
- Continent: Antarctica
- Region(s): Victoria Land, Antarctica
- Range coordinates: 71°12′S 164°0′E

Posey Range (71°12′S 164°0′E) is a mountain range in eastern Bowers Mountains, bounded by the Smithson Glacier, Graveson Glacier, Lillie Glacier and Champness Glacier.

== Exploration and naming ==
The Posey Range was mapped by the United States Geological Survey (USGS) from ground surveys and United States Navy air photos, 1960–62. It was named by the United States Advisory Committee on Antarctic Names (US-ACAN) for Julian W. Posey, meteorologist, who was scientific leader at South Pole Station, winter party 1959.

== Location ==
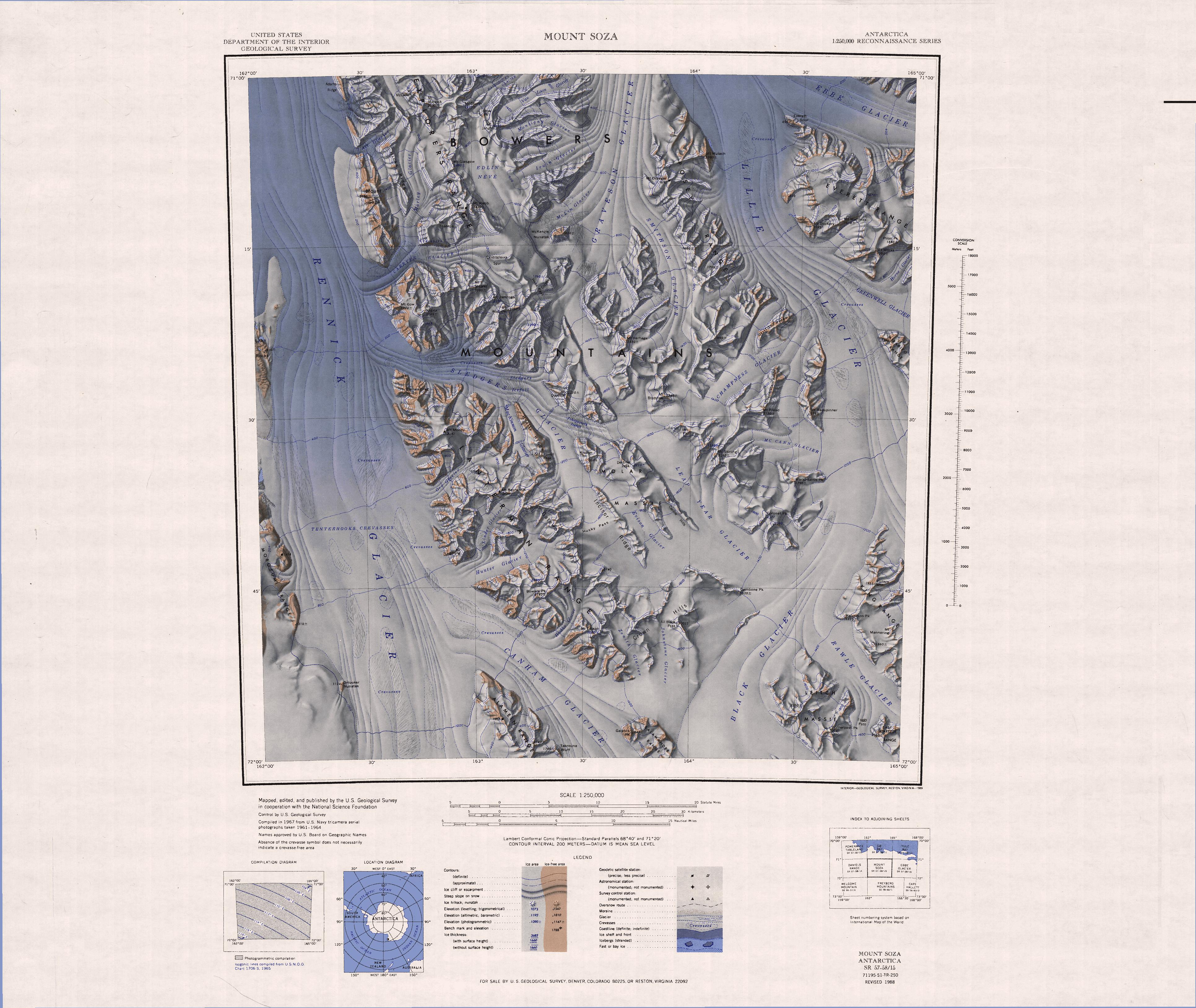
Southern part of the range to northwest

The Champness Glacier defines the south edge of the Posey Range, running east to join the Lillie Glacier, which flows north to the sea and defines the eastern edge of the range. The Smithson Glacier flow north past the southern part of the range and joins the Graveson Glacier, which continues north and joins the Lillie Glacier at the north tip of the range. The Cosey Range is east of the Explorers Range and west of the Everett Range. To its south is the massif that contain Mount Stirling.

== Features ==
Features of the Posey Range, from north to south, include Mount Mulach, Mount Draeger and the Griffith Ridge.

=== Mount Mulach ===
71°07′S 164°04′E. A mountain 1,080 metres (3,540 ft) high standing 4 nautical miles (7.4 km; 4.6 mi) northeast of Mount Draeger on the east side of the Posey Range, where it overlooks the Lillie Glacier. Mapped by USGS from ground surveys and United States Navy air photos, 1960-62. Named by US-ACAN for Chief Electrician's Mate William J. Mulach, United States Navy, of the McMurdo Station winter party, 1967.

=== Mount Draeger ===
71°09′S 163°54′E. A mountain, 1,690 metres (5,540 ft) high, in the northwest part of the Posey Range. The mountain overlooks from the east the junction of the Smithson Glacier with the Graveson Glacier. Mapped by USGS from surveys and United States Navy air photos, 1960-62. Named by US-ACAN for chief radioman Ernest J. Draeger, United States Navy, a member of the winter party at McMurdo Station in 1967.

=== Griffith Ridge ===
71°22′S 164°23′E. A rock ridge 5 nautical miles (9.3 km; 5.8 mi) long in the Bowers Mountains, located just within the mouth of Champness Glacier, where the latter joins the larger Lillie Glacier. Mapped by USGS from surveys and United States Navy air photos, 1960-62. Named by US-ACAN for Lieutenant Harry G. Griffith, United States Navy, public works officer at McMurdo Station, 1967.

== Sources ==
- Alberts, Fred G., ed. (1995), Geographic Names of the Antarctic (PDF) (2 ed.), United States Board on Geographic Names This article incorporates public domain material from websites or documents of the United States Board on Geographic Names.
- Mount Soza, USGS: United States Geographic Board

This article incorporates public domain material from websites or documents of the United States Geological Survey.
