= Mirabito Range =

Mountain range in Victoria Land, Antarctica

- Location within Antarctica

Highest point
- Coordinates: 71°40′S 165°27′E

The Mirabito Range (71°40′S 165°27′E) is a narrow, northwest-trending mountain range, 64 kilometres (40 mi) long and 6 kilometres (3.7 mi) wide that lies between the upper part of Lillie Glacier and the Greenwell Glacier in northern Victoria Land, Antarctica. The range is part of the Concord Mountains.

== Exploration and naming ==
The range was mapped by the United States Geological Survey (USGS) from surveys and United States Navy aerial photography, 1960–63. It was named by the Advisory Committee on Antarctic Names (US-ACAN) for Lieutenant Commander John A. Mirabito, U.S. Navy, staff Meteorological Officer on four Deep Freeze Operations, 1955–59.

== Location ==
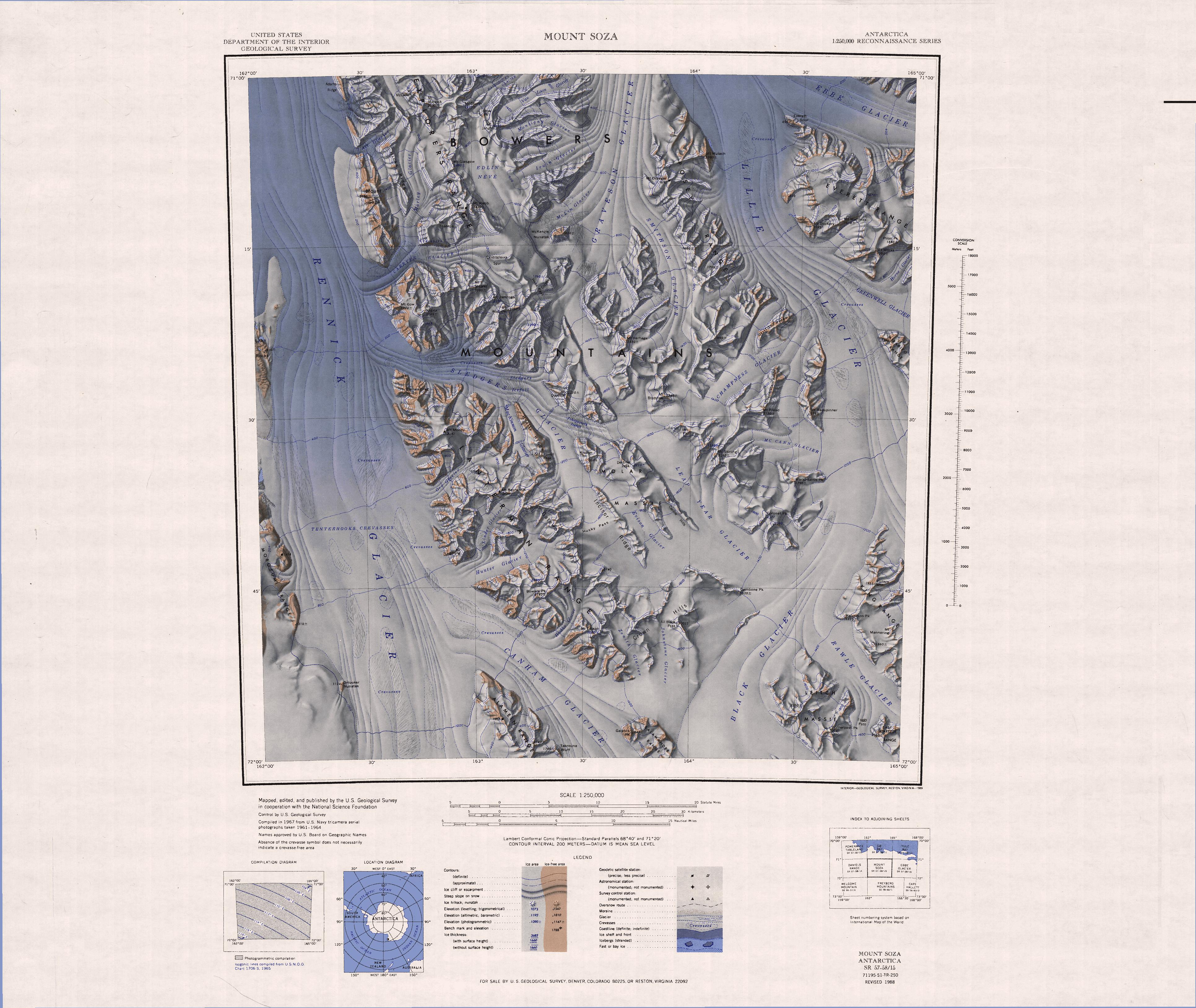
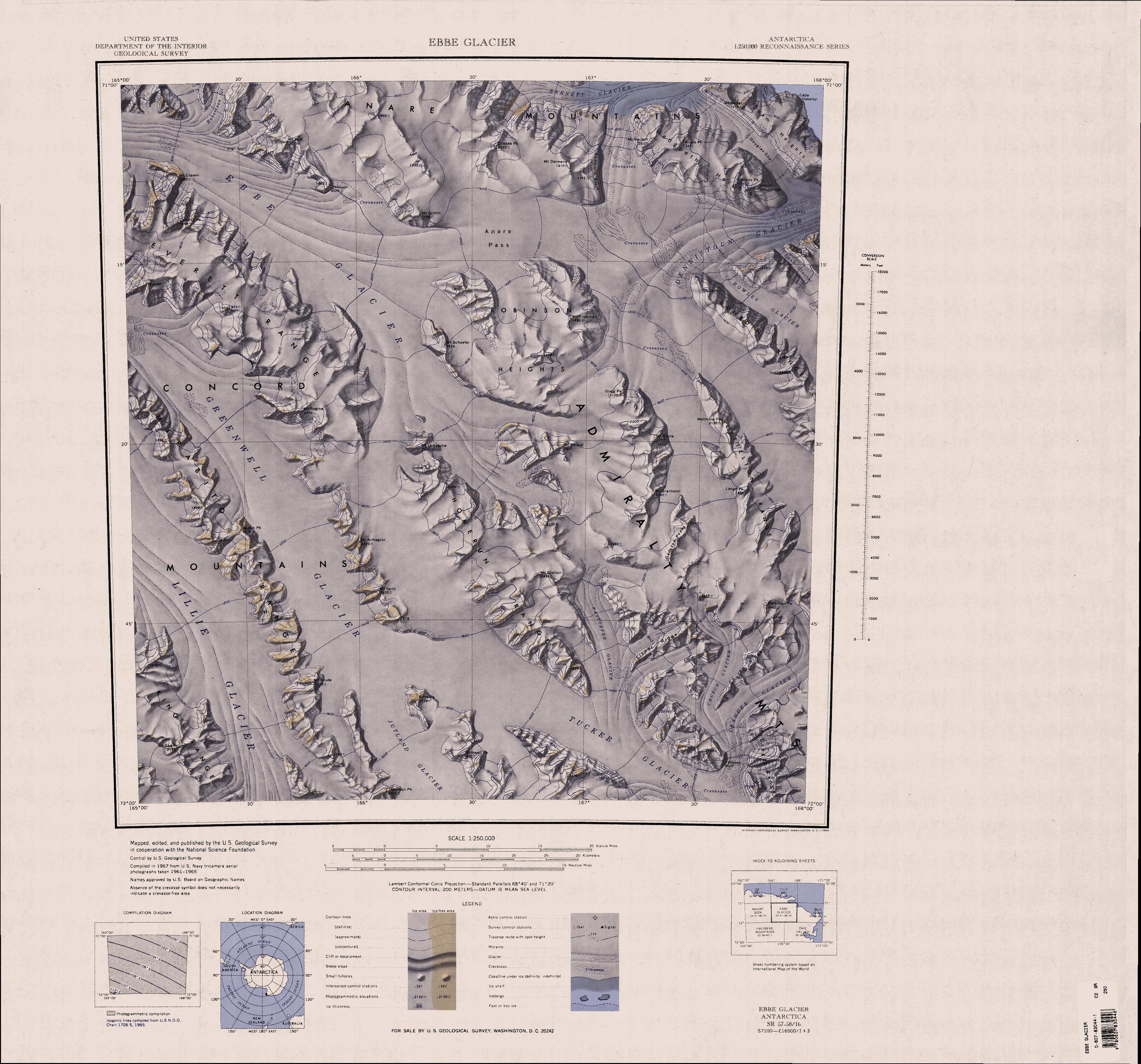
Concord Mountains. Mirabito Range in west of the right-hand map

The northwest tip of the Mirabito Range is east of the Lillie Glacier and southwest of the Greenwell Glacier at the point where it joins the Lillie Glacier. The range extends in a south-southeast direction between these two glaciers. In the extreme south it is west of the Jutland Glacier, which joins the Greenwell Glacier. Features include Austin Peak in the center of the range, Mount Shute further south and Thompson Peak at the south end.

== Features ==
=== Austin Peak ===
71°37′S 165°29′E. A peak in the east-central portion of the Mirabito Range. Named by the northern party of NZGSAE, 1963–64, for William T. Austin, USARP Representative at McMurdo Station, 1963–64, who organized support for the New Zealand field parties.

=== Mount Shute ===
71°50′S 165°47′E. A mountain, 2,070 metres (6,790 ft), standing 14 miles (23 km) southeast SE of Austin Peak in Mirabito Range. Mapped by USGS from surveys and U.S. Navy air photos 1960 63. Named by US-ACAN for Larry R. Shute, USARP meteorologist at Hallett Station, 1963–64.

=== Red Rock Peak ===
71°58′S 166°05′E. A peak rising to 2,000 metres (6,600 ft) about 1 mile (1.6 km) north-northwest of Thomson Peak in the south part of Mirabito Range, Victoria Land. The name is descriptive of the rock at the peak and was given by Bradley Field, geologist, NZGS, a member of a NZARP geological party to the area, 1980–81.

=== Thomson Peak ===
71°59′S 166°07′E. A peak, 2,350 metres (7,710 ft) high, situated 11 miles (18 km) southeast of Mount Shute at the extreme south limit of Mirabito Range. Named by the northern party of NZGSAE, 1963–64, for Robert B. Thomson of New Zealand, scientific leader at Hallett Station, 1960; officer-in-charge at Wilkes Station, 1962; deputy leader at Scott base, 1963–64.

== Sources ==
- Alberts, Fred G., ed. (1995), Geographic Names of the Antarctic (PDF) (2 ed.), United States Board on Geographic Names This article incorporates public domain material from websites or documents of the United States Board on Geographic Names.
- Ebbe Glacier, USGS: United States Geographic Board
- "Mirabito Range", Antarctica NZ
- Mount Soza, USGS: United States Geographic Board
