= Ob' Bay =

Body of water in Victoria Land, Antarctica

- Location within Antarctica
- Coordinates: 70°35′S 163°22′E
- Ocean/sea sources: Southern Ocean

Ob' Bay (70°35′S 163°22′E) is a bay lying between Lunik Point and Cape Williams in Antarctica. Lillie Glacier Tongue occupies the east part of the bay. The bay was charted by the Soviet Antarctic Expedition (1958) and named after the expedition ship Ob'.

== Location ==
Ob' Bay is on the Pacific Ocean to the east of the Explorers Range of the Bowers Mountains. It is northwest of the Anare Mountains The bay stretches between Lunik Point below Mount Dergach in the west and Cape Williams in the east. Astapenko Glacier enters the bay to the south of Mount Dergach, and is joined at its point of entry by Chugunov Glacier and Astakhov Glacier to the east. Further east, past Platypus Ridge, Lillie Glacier enters the bay, with Lillie Glacier Tongue extending into the bay. The Sputnik Islands are in the entrance to the bay.

Sailing Directions for Antarctica (1943) says "Lillie Glacier Tongue extends northward from snow-covered rounded hills between Cape Cheetham and Williams Head for a distance of about 20 miles, and is about 125 feet (38 m) high. A sounding of 134 fathoms (245 m) has been plotted about 4 miles northward of the Tongue. Many grounded icebergs and unbroken fast ice fringe the shore, and a strong northwestward current sets along the coast."

== Features ==
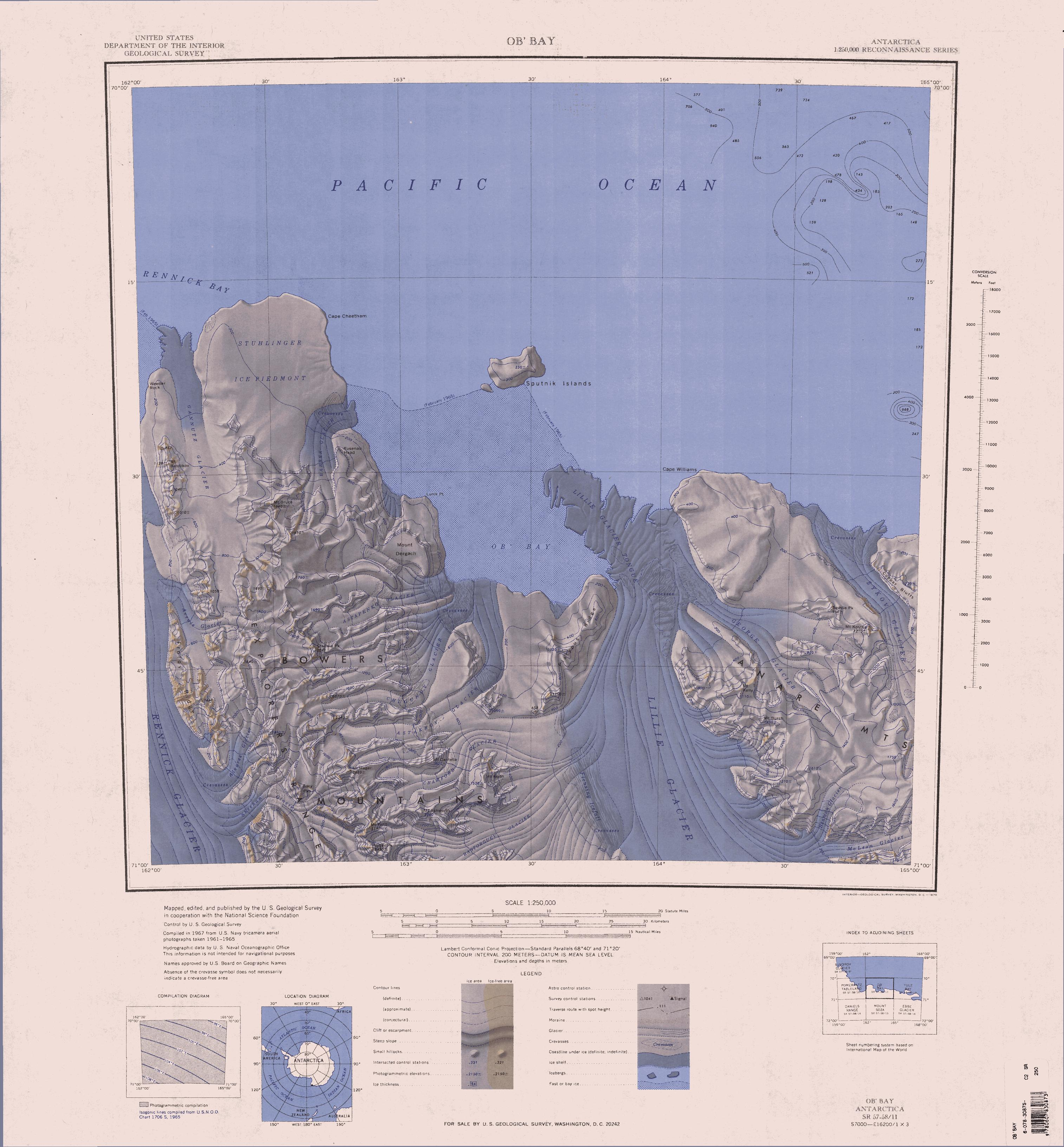
Ob' Bay area including mouth of Lillie Glacier, center of map

Named features, from west to east, include:

=== Barber Glacier ===
70°26′S 162°45′E. A glacier rising just east of Mount Bruce in the Bowers Mountains and flowing north to the coast between Stuhlinger Ice Piedmont and Rosenau Head. Mapped by USGS from surveys and United States Navy air photos, 1960–65. Named by US-ACAN for Capt. Don W. Barber, CE, USA, construction and equipment officer, U.S. Naval Support Force, Antarctica, 1967 and 1968.

=== Lunik Point ===
70°32′S 163°06′E. An ice-covered coastal point, lying 3 nautical miles (5.6 km; 3.5 mi) northeast of Mount Dergach on the west side of Ob' Bay. Photographed and plotted by the Soviet Antarctic Expedition, 1958, and named after the first Soviet moon module (called "Lunik").

=== Mount Dergach ===
70°36′S 163°01′E. A flat-topped, ice-covered mountain located just west of Ob' Bay and south of Lunik Point. Photographed from the air by United States Navy Operation Highjump, 1946–47. Surveyed by the Soviet Antarctic Expedition in 1958 and named after meteorologist A.P. Dergach, a member of the Soviet Antarctic Expedition, 1959–61, who perished in a fire at Mirny Station on August 3, 1960.

=== Astapenko Glacier ===
70°40′S 163°00′E. Glacier, 11 nautical miles (20 km; 13 mi) long, draining the north and northeast slopes of Stanwix Peak in the Bowers Mountains and flowing ENE to Ob' Bay. Mapped by United States Geological Survey (USGS) from surveys and U.S. Navy air photos, 1960–62. Named by United States Advisory Committee on Antarctic Names (US-ACAN) for Pavel D. Astapenko, Soviet IGY observer, a Weather Central meteorologist at Little America V in 1958.

=== Chugunov Glacier ===
70°43′S 163°09′E. Glacier about 15 nautical miles (28 km; 17 mi) long located just north of Astakhov Glacier in the Bowers Mountains. It is one of several glaciers which drain the east slopes of the Explorers Range and flow to Ob' Bay. Plotted from photographs taken by the Soviet Antarctic Expedition in 1958. Named for N.A. Chugunov, Soviet aerologist who died while taking part in this expedition.

=== Astakhov Glacier ===
70°45′S 163°21′E. The glacier next south of Chugunov Glacier in the Explorers Range, Bowers Mountains. It flows northeast from Mount Hager and enters Ob' Bay just west of Platypus Ridge. Mapped by USGS from surveys and U.S. Navy air photos, 1960–65. Named by US-ACAN for Petr Astakhov, Soviet exchange scientist at the U.S. South Pole Station in 1967.

=== Platypus Ridge ===
70°42′S 163°43′E. Large ice-covered ridge bordering the west side of the mouth of Lillie Glacier. It extends northeast from Bowers Mountains to the head of Ob' Bay. Its position was fixed by S.L. Kirkby, surveyor with Australian National Antarctic Research Expedition (ANARE) (Thala Dan) in Feb. 1962. Named by ANARE after this monotreme mammal, native only to Australia.

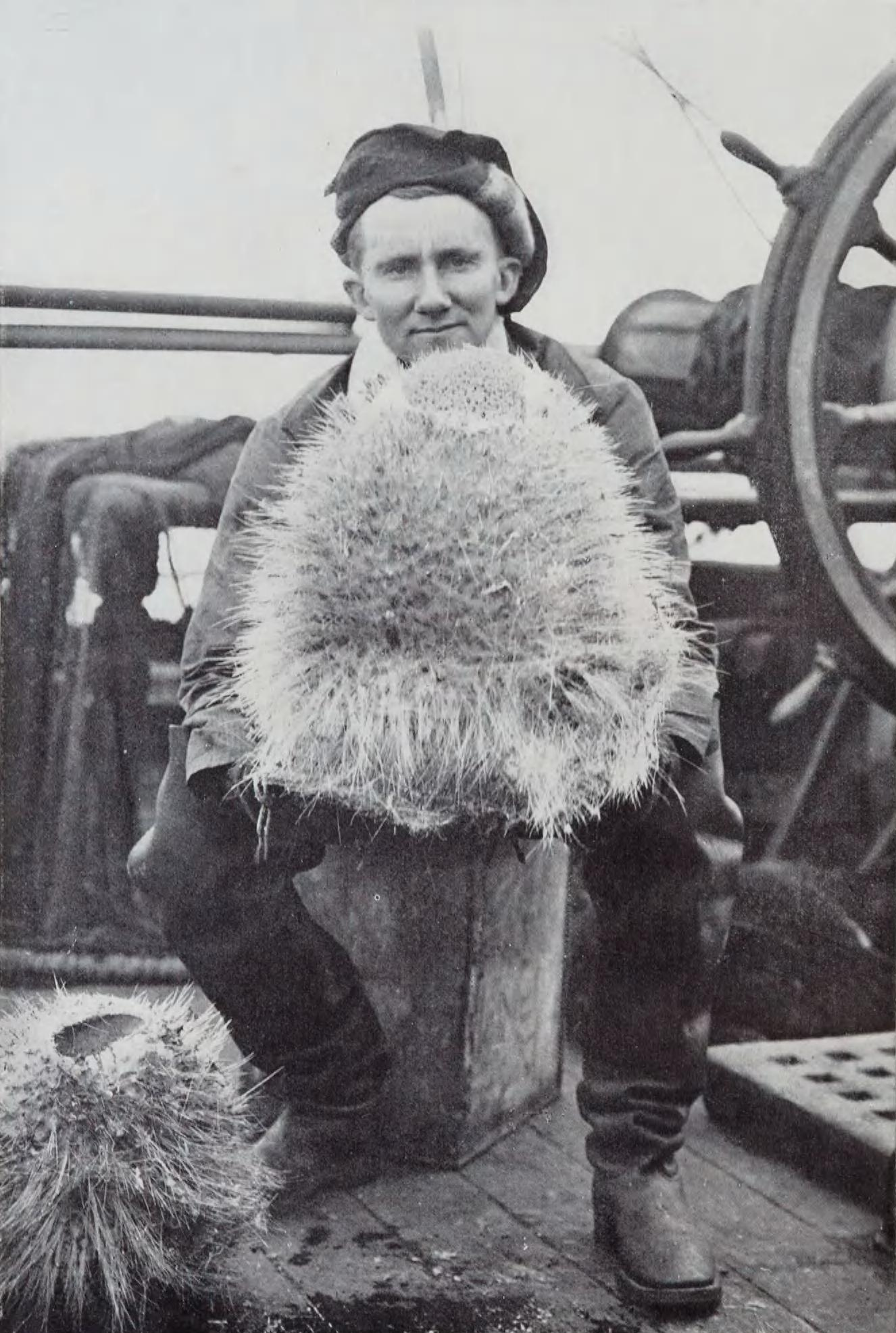
Denis G. Lillie with siliceous sponges

=== Lillie Glacier Tongue ===
70°34′S 163°48′E. The prominent seaward extension of the Lillie Glacier into Ob' Bay. Discovered by the British Antarctic Expedition, 1910–13, when the Terra Nova explored westward of Cape North in February 1911. Named by British Antarctic Expedition for Denis G. Lillie, biologist on the Terra Nova.

=== Sputnik Islands ===
70°22′S 163°22′E. Two ice-covered islands, one much larger than the other, located between Cape Cheetham and Cape Williams in the entrance to Ob' Bay. The islands were photographed from the air by United States Navy Operation Highjump, 1946–47. Surveyed by the Soviet Antarctic Expedition, 1958, and named after Sputnik 1, the first Soviet artificial earth satellite.

== Sources ==
- Alberts, Fred G., ed. (1995), Geographic Names of the Antarctic (PDF) (2 ed.), United States Board on Geographic Names This article incorporates public domain material from websites or documents of the United States Board on Geographic Names.
- Ob' Bay, USGS: United States Geological Survey
- Sailing Directions for Antarctica: Including the Off-lyng Islands South of Latitude 60̊, United States. Hydrographic Office, 1943

This article incorporates public domain material from websites or documents of the United States Geological Survey.
