= Millen Range =

Mountain range in Antarctica

- Location within Antarctica

Highest point
- Elevation: 3,200 m (10,500 ft)

Geography
- Continent: Antarctica
- Region(s): Victoria Land, Antarctica
- Range coordinates: 72°20′S 166°15′E

The Millen Range (72°20′S 166°15′E) is a prominent northwest–southeast trending mountain range, located west of the Cartographers Range in the Victory Mountains of Antarctica. Peaks in the range include Inferno, Omega, Le Couteur, Head, Cirque, Gless, Turret, Crosscut and Mount Aorangi. It was named by the New Zealand Federated Mountain Clubs Antarctic Expedition (NZFMCAE) of 1962–63, for John M. Millen, leader of the expedition.

== Location ==
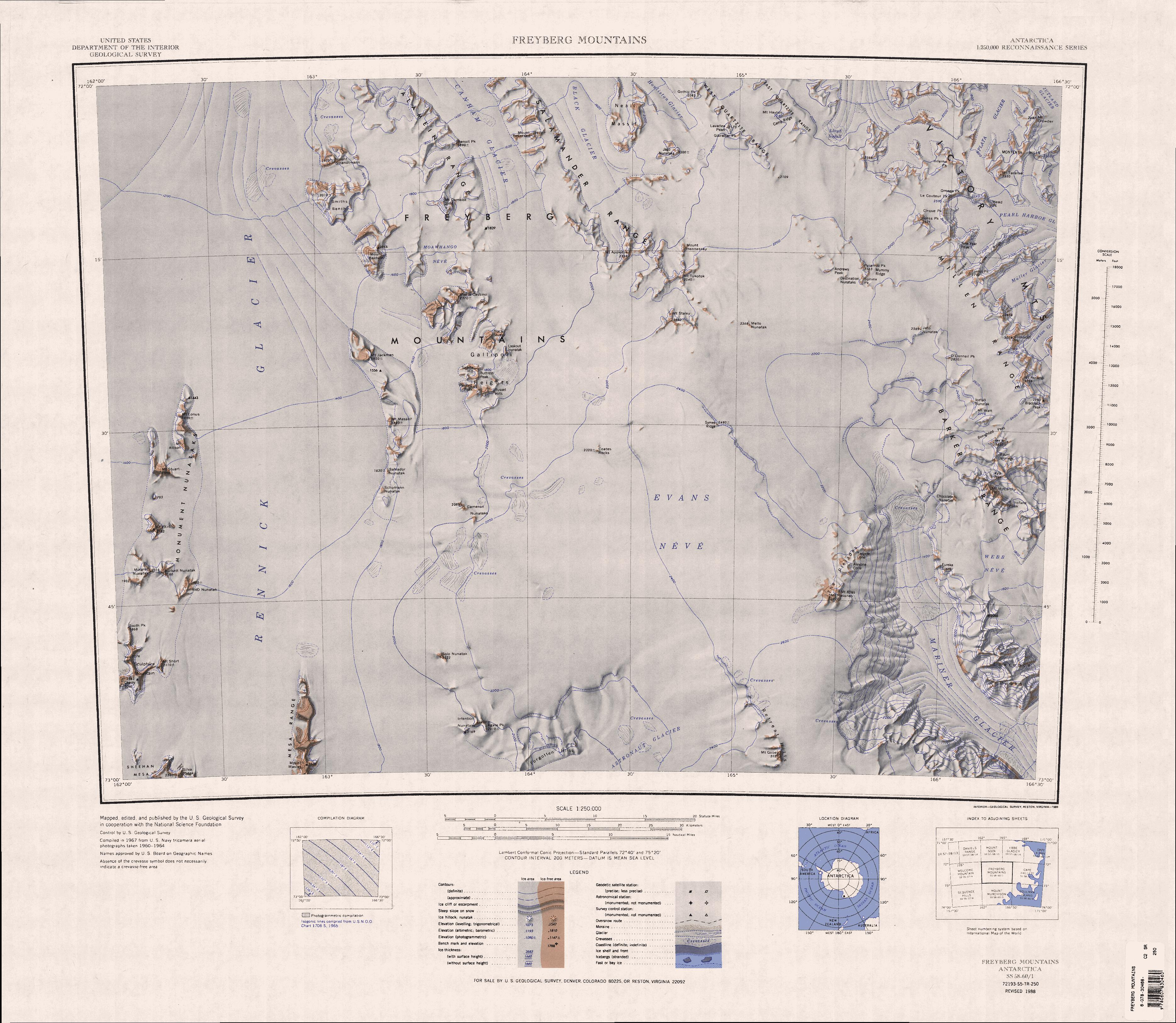
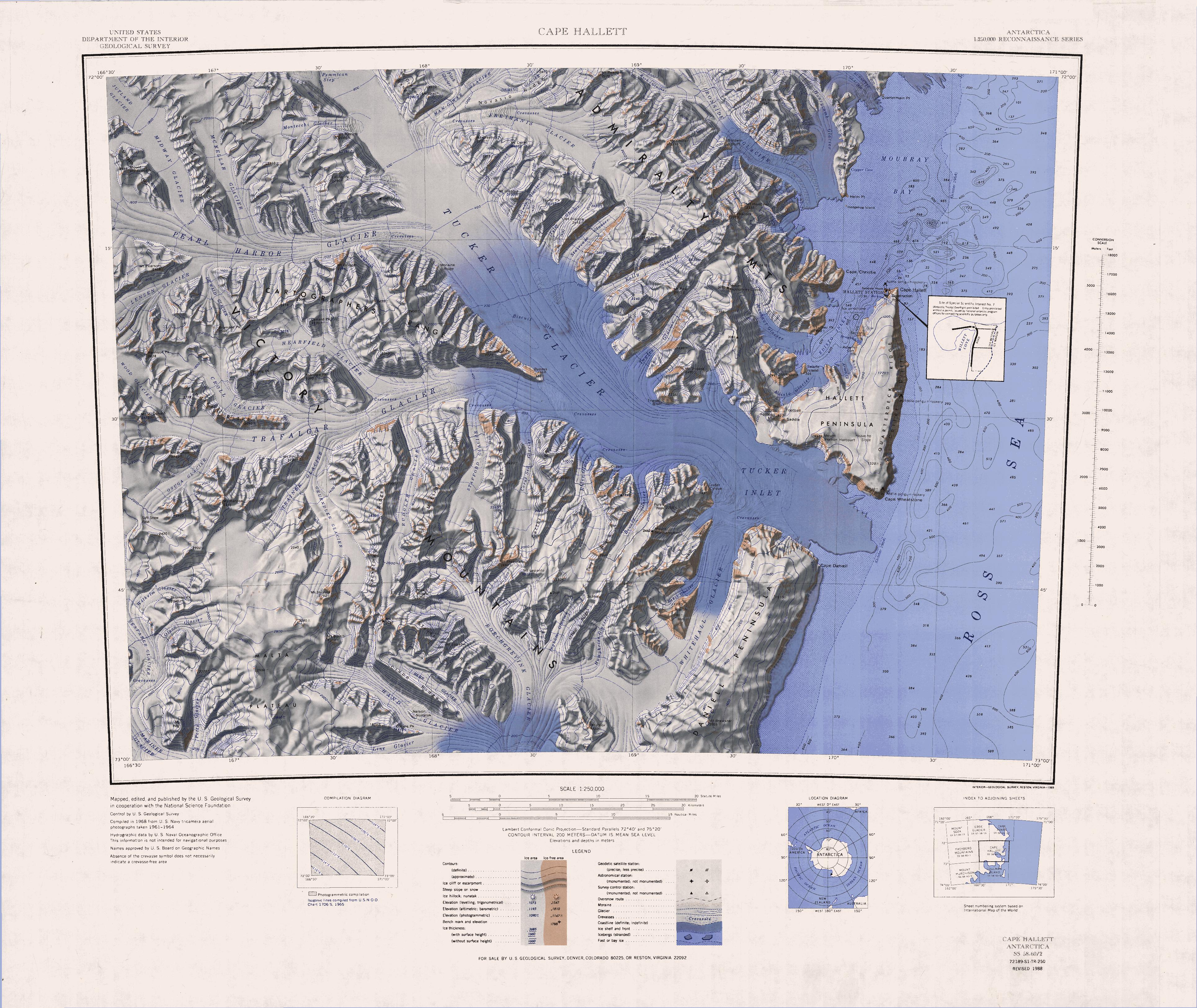
Millen Range in east of left map, tip in right map

The Millen Range in the western Victory Mountains extends in a southeast direction to the east of the East Quartzite Range, Destination Nunataks and Barker Range. It is bounded to the east by the Pearl Harbor Glacier, Muller Glacier, Lensen Glacier and Wood Glacier.

== Features ==
Features include, from northwest to southeast,

=== Inferno Peak ===
72°07′S 165°59′E. A peak 3 nautical miles (5.6 km; 3.5 mi) north of Le Couteur Peak in the north end of Millen Range. So named by the Southern Party of NZFMCAE, 1962-63, because geologic examination showed it contained the granite/greywacke contact, with baking of the sedimentary rock imparting a reddish color to the peak.

=== Head Peak ===
72°10′S 166°11′E. A peak 3.5 nautical miles (6.5 km; 4.0 mi) east of Le Couteur Peak, situated on a projecting ridge of Millen Range in the névé area of Pearl Harbor Glacier. So named by the Southern Party of NZFMCAE, 1962-63, due to its likeness to a head and to its position at the head of Pearl Harbor Glacier.

=== Omega Peak ===
72°09′S 166°03′E. A peak 1 nautical mile (1.9 km; 1.2 mi) northeast of Le Couteur Peak. So named by the Southern Party of NZFMCAE, 1962-63, because this was the last major peak climbed by the party, January 2, 1963.

=== Le Couteur Peak ===
72°09′S 165°59′E. A peak between Cirque and Omega Peaks, in the north part of Millen Range. Named by the Southern Party of the NZFMCAE, 1962-63, for P.C. Le Couteur, geologist with this party.

=== Cirque Peak ===
72°11′S 165°58′E. A peak 1 nautical mile (1.9 km; 1.2 mi) south of Le Couteur Peak. So named by the Northern Party of NZFMCAE, 1962-63, due to the peak's position at the head of a large cirque containing a section of the Pearl Harbor Glacier névé.

=== Gless Peak ===
72°12′S 165°51′E. A peak, 2,630 metres (8,630 ft) high, standing 2 nautical miles (3.7 km; 2.3 mi) west-southwest of Cirque Peak. Mapped by the United States Geological Survey (USGS) from surveys and United States Navy air photos, 1960-64. Named by the United States Advisory Committee on Antarctic Names (US-ACAN) for Elmer E. Gless, biologist at Hallett Station, summers 1965-66, 1966-67 and 1967-68.

=== New Year Peak ===
72°14′S 166°03′E. The major peak about 2,600 metres (8,500 ft) high on the northwest side of Toboggan Gap. The name was suggested by Bradley Field, geologist, NZGS, whose field party camped below the peak during the New Year period, 1981-82.

=== Toboggan Gap ===
72°16′S 166°03′E. A pass through the Millen Range just north of Turret Peak, offering good sledging from the polar plateau to the Pearl Harbor Glacier ne~ve. Named by the Southern Party of NZFMCAE, 1962-63.

=== Turret Ridge ===
72°14′S 166°13′E. A ridge about 5 nautical miles (9.3 km; 5.8 mi) long extending northeast from Turret Peak. Visited by a New Zealand Antarctic Research Programme (NZARP) geological party led by R.H. Findlay, 1981-82, and named in association with Turret Peak.

=== Turret Peak ===
72°16′S 166°06′E. A prominent rock peak, 2,790 metres (9,150 ft) high, standing 7 nautical miles (13 km; 8.1 mi) northwest of Crosscut Peak. The peak is topped with a 10 metres (33 ft) high vertical spire, or tower, which is an excellent landmark. Named for its distinctive appearance by the Southern party of NZFMCAE, 1962-63.

=== Crosscut Peak ===
72°22′S 166°19′E. A peak, 3,120 metres (10,240 ft) high, just north of Joice Icefall. So named by the Southern Party of NZFMCAE, 1962-63, due to its jagged northern ridge and summit.

=== Joice Icefall ===
72°23′S 166°21′E. An icefall draining from the polar plateau through the Millen Range into Lensen Glacier. Named by the Southern Party of NZFMCAE, 1962-63, after I. Joice, field assistant to the party.

=== Mount Aorangi ===
72°25′S 166°22′E. The highest mountain, 3,135 metres (10,285 ft) high, in the Millen Range. So named by the NZFMCAE, 1962-63, because of this mountain's cloudpiercing ability, and also in memory of Mount Cook, New Zealand, known to the Maori people as "Aorangi" (the cloud piercer).

=== Braddock Peak ===
72°27′S 166°28′E. A peak rising to 2,960 metres (9,710 ft) high immediately southeast of Mount Aorangi in the south part of Millen Range. Named by the New Zealand Antarctic Place-Names Committee (NZ-APC), on the proposal of geologist R.A. Cooper, after Peter Braddock, field leader of geological parties to the area in the 1974-75 and 1980-81 seasons.

=== Mount Pearson ===
72°17′S 166°43′E. A prominent snow peak 2,440 metres (8,010 ft) high situated at the west side of the mouth of Lensen Glacier where the latter joins Pearl Harbor Glacier. Named by the northern party of NZFMCAE, 1962-63, for F.H. Pearson, surveyor with the party.

== Sources ==
- Alberts, Fred G., ed. (1995), Geographic Names of the Antarctic (PDF) (2 ed.), United States Board on Geographic Names This article incorporates public domain material from websites or documents of the United States Board on Geographic Names.
- Cape Hallet, USGS: United States Geographic Board
- Freyberg Mountains, USGS: United States Geographic Board

This article incorporates public domain material from websites or documents of the United States Geological Survey.
