= Copper Cove =

Copper Cove may refer to:

- Copper Cove (Antarctica)
- Copper Cove Subdivision, California
