= Mount McCarthy =

Mount McCarthy may refer to:

- Mount McCarthy (Prince Charles Mountains)
- Mount McCarthy (Victoria Land)
