= Mount Macdonald (disambiguation) =

Mount Macdonald is a mountain in British Columbia, Canada.

Mount Macdonald or Mount McDonald may also refer to:

== Antarctica ==
- Mount Macdonald (Antarctica), a mountain in the Commonwealth Range
- Mount McDonald (Antarctica), a mountain in the Barker Range

== Other places ==
- Mount Macdonald (Vanuatu), a peak on the island of Efate
- Mount Macdonald (Yukon), a mountain in Yukon Territory, Canada
- Mount McDonald, New South Wales, a former mining town near Wyangala, New South Wales, Australia
