= Trigon Bluff =

Trigon Bluff (72°29′S 169°9′E) is a steep, triangular bluff 10 nautical miles (18 km) west of Football Mountain, rising to 1,245 m on the north side of Tucker Glacier. Named by the New Zealand Geological Survey Antarctic Expedition (NZGSAE), 1957–58, which placed a triangulation station on its summit. The name is descriptive.
