= Slagle Ridge =

Ridge in Antarctica

- Location within Antarctica

Highest point
- Coordinates: 71°55′S 169°50′E

Geography
- Location: Victoria Land, Antarctica
- Parent range: Admiralty Mountains

Slagle Ridge (71°55′S 169°50′E) is a high and massive snow-covered ridge between Slone Glacier and Burnette Glacier in the Admiralty Mountains, Victoria Land, Antarctica.

== Exploration and name ==
Slagle Ridge was mapped by the United States Geological Survey (USGS) from surveys and United States Navy air photos, 1960–63. It was named by the United States Advisory Committee on Antarctic Names (US-ACAN) for Captain Thomas D. Slagle, U.S. Navy, Chief Medical Officer at Little America V in 1958.

== Location ==
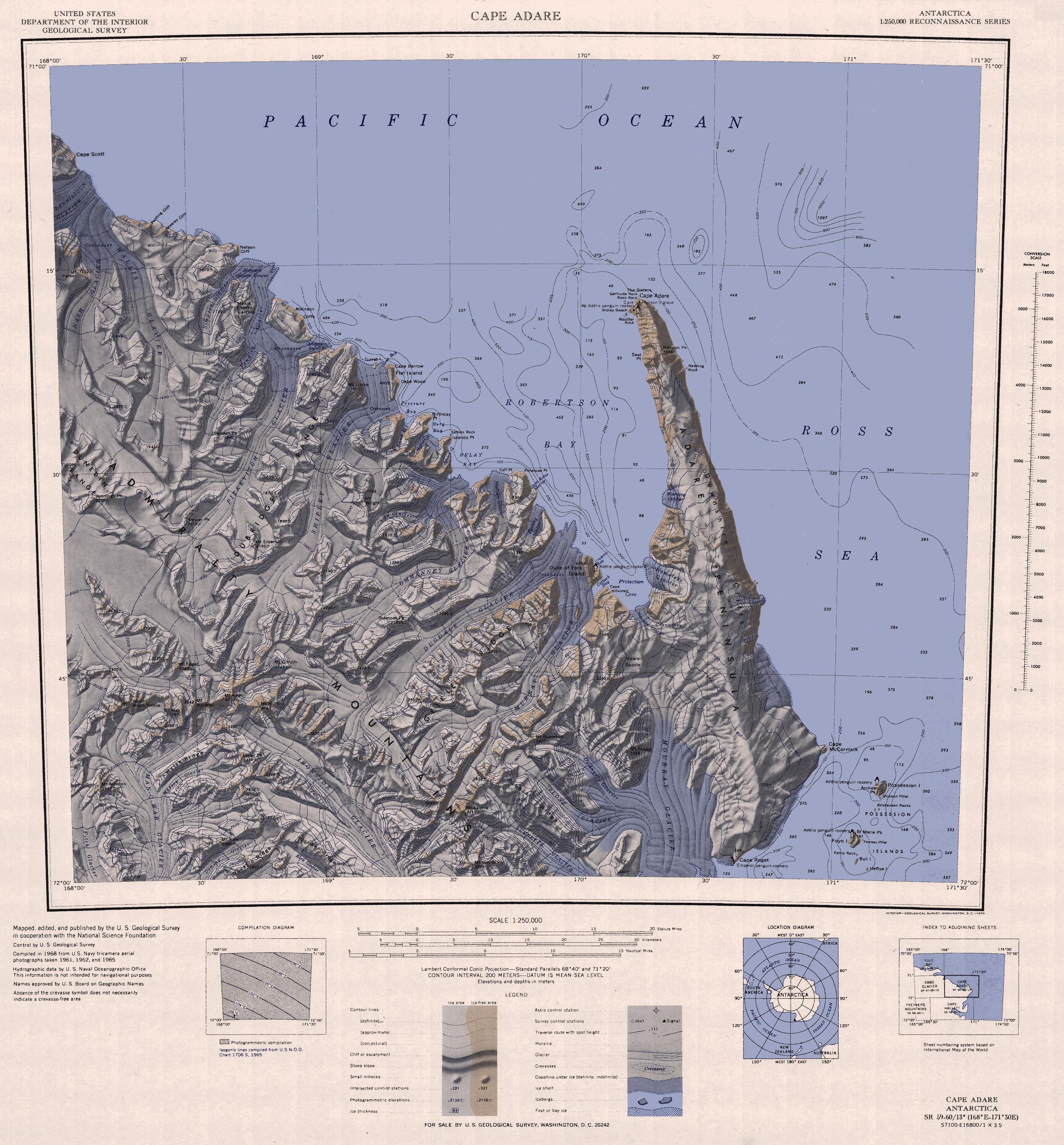
Slage Ridge in southeast

The Slagle Ridge extends northwest–southeast between the Slone Glacier and Burnette Glacier, both tributaries of the Moubray Glacier, which flows down the west side of the Adare Peninsula. The Murray Glacier originates to the north of the ridge. It is east of Mount Sabine, Mount Von Braun and Mount Whewell, and southwest of Mount Robinson and Mount Ruegg.

== Nearby features ==
=== Mount Sabine ===
71°55′S 169°33′E. A prominent, relatively snow-free mountain rising to 3,720 metres (12,200 ft) high between the heads of Murray Glacier and Burnette Glacier. Discovered on January 15, 1841, by Captain James Ross, RN, who named this feature for Lieutenant Colonel Edward Sabine of the Royal Artillery, Foreign Secretary of the Royal Society, one of the most active supporters of the expedition.

=== Mount Von Braun ===
71°59′S 169°34′E. Mountain 3,275 metres (10,745 ft) high located 4 nautical miles (7.4 km; 4.6 mi) south of Mount Sabine. Mapped by USGS from surveys and United States Navy air photos, 1960–63. Named by US-ACAN for Wernher von Braun of the National Aeronautics and Space Administration, a visitor at McMurdo Station, 1966–67.

=== Mount Whewell ===
72°03′S 169°35′E. A massive mountain 2,945 metres (9,662 ft) high between the mouths of Ironside Glacier and Honeycomb Glacier. Named by Sir James Clark Ross, January 15, 1841, for the Reverend Doctor William Whewell, Master of Trinity College, Cambridge.

=== Mount Robinson ===
71°50′S 169°49′E. A mountain 2,430 metres (7,970 ft) high at the head of the DeAngelo Glacier. Discovered on January 15, 1841, by Captain James Clark Ross, Royal Navy, who named the feature for Rev. Doctor Thomas Romney Robinson of Armagh, one of the more active promoters of magnetic research in the Antarctic and a member of the committee of the British Association which advocated sending out this expedition.

=== Mount Ruegg ===
71°51′S 170°11′E. The culminating peak 1,870 metres (6,140 ft) high on the divide between DeAngelo Glacier and Moubray Glacier. Named by the New Zealand Antarctic Place-Names Committee (NZ-APC) for Captain H. Ruegg, nautical advisor to the Marine Department of New Zealand, a visitor to the Ross Sea area in 1956.

=== Mount Bevin ===
71.9°S 169.45°E A prominent sharply pointed mountain which rises to 3,490 metres (11,450 ft) high at the west side of the head of Murray Glacier. The mountain stands 2 nautical miles (3.7 km; 2.3 mi) west-northwest of Mount Sabine. Named by US-ACAN (2004) after Anthony (Tony) J. Bevin, Surveyor-General, New Zealand, and chairman, New Zealand Geographic Board, 1996–2004, with responsibility for New Zealand surveying and place naming in Antarctica.

== Sources ==
- Alberts, Fred G., ed. (1995), Geographic Names of the Antarctic (PDF) (2 ed.), United States Board on Geographic Names This article incorporates public domain material from websites or documents of the United States Board on Geographic Names.
- Cape Adare, USGS: United States Geographic Board
- "Mount Bevin", Geographic Names Information System, United States Geological Survey, United States Department of the Interior

This article incorporates public domain material from websites or documents of the United States Geological Survey.
