= Cartographers Range =

Mountain Range

- Location within Antarctica

Highest point
- Elevation: 2,011 m (6,598 ft)

Geography
- Continent: Antarctica
- Region(s): Victoria Land, Antarctica
- Range coordinates: 72°21′S 167°50′E

Cartographers Range (72°21′S 167°50′E) is a rugged range about 25 nautical miles (46 km; 29 mi) long in the Victory Mountains, Victoria Land in Antarctica. It is bounded on the north by Pearl Harbor Glacier, on the east by Tucker Glacier, and on the south by Hearfield Glacier and Trafalgar Glacier. Mapped by the United States Geological Survey (USGS) from surveys and United States Navy air photos, 1960–64. Named by the United States Advisory Committee on Antarctic Names (US-ACAN) for the cartographers and cartographic technicians of the Branch of Special Maps, USGS.

== Glaciers ==
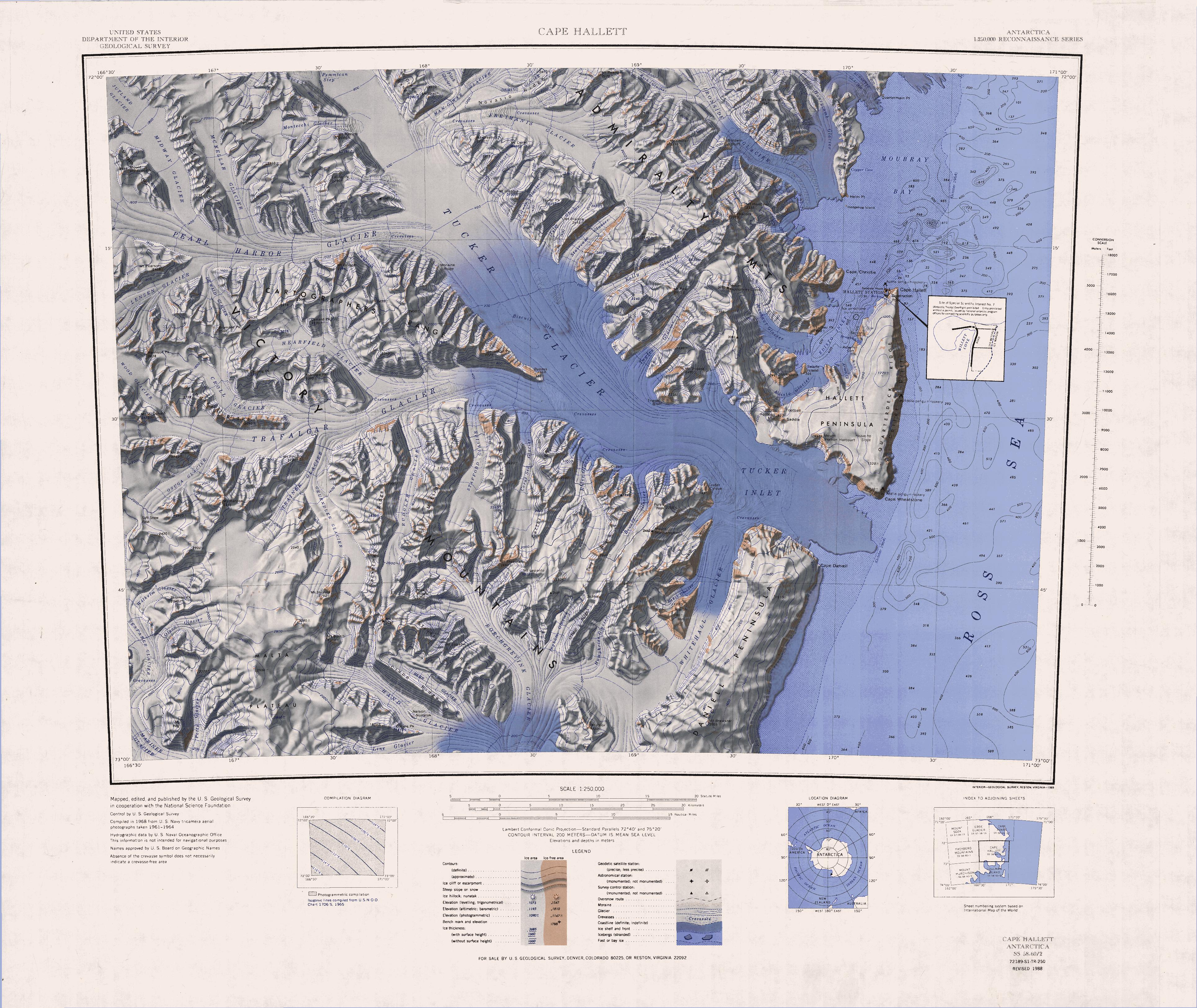
Cartographers Range towards the northeast

The Cartographers Range is bounded to the north by the Lensen Glacier and Pearl Harbor Glacier, to the east by the Tucker Glacier and to the south by the Wood Glacier and Trafalgar Glacier. The Lensen Glacier, DeWald Glacier and Whiplash Glacier flow north from the range into the Pearl Harbor Glacier. The Wood Glacier, Croll Glacier, Hearfield Glacier and Coulston Glacier flow south into the Trafalgar Glacier.

== Features ==
Features include, from west to east:

=== Harrison Peak ===
72°24′S 166°39′E. A peak 2,830 metres (9,280 ft) high along the north side of Wood Glacier, about 5 nautical miles (9.3 km; 5.8 mi) north of Mount McDonald. Mapped by USGS from surveys and United States Navy air photos, 1960-64. Named by US-ACAN for William R. Harrison, biologist at McMurdo Station, 1967-68.

=== Bramble Peak ===
72°22′S 166°59′E. A peak 2,560 metres (8,400 ft) high that surmounts the northeast side of the head of Croll Glacier. Mapped by USGS from surveys and United States Navy air photos, 1960-64. Named by US-ACAN for Edward J. Bramble, United States Navy, aviation machinist's mate with Squadron VX-6 at McMurdo Station, 1967.

=== Capling Peak ===
72°26′S 167°08′E. A peak 2,730 metres (8,960 ft) high on the north side of Croll Glacier, 5 nautical miles (9.3 km; 5.8 mi) southeast of Bramble Peak. Mapped by USGS from surveys and United States Navy air photos, 1960-64. Named by US-ACAN for Robert W. Capling, United States Navy, aviation machinist's mate and flight engineer on Hercules aircraft at McMurdo Station during Operation Deep Freeze 1967 and 1968.

=== Aldridge Peak ===
72°27′S 167°24′E. A peak 2,290 metres (7,510 ft) high on the ridge between Hearfield Glacier and Trafalgar Glacier. Mapped by USGS from surveys and United States Navy air photos, 1960-62. Named by US-ACAN for James A. Aldridge, aviation machinist's mate with United States Navy Squadron VX-6 at McMurdo Station, 1967.

=== Conard Peak ===
72°22′S 167°26′E. A peak 2,230 metres (7,320 ft) high along the north side of Hearfield Glacier, about 5 nautical miles (9.3 km; 5.8 mi) north of Aldridge Peak. Mapped by USGS from surveys and United States Navy air photos, 1960-64. Named by US-ACAN for Ralph W. Conard, a member of the aircraft ground handling crew with United States Navy Squadron VX-6 at Williams Field, Ross Island, during Operation Deep Freeze 1968.

=== Mount Bridger ===
72°17′S 167°35′E. A mountain 2,295 metres (7,530 ft) high along the south side of Pearl Harbor Glacier, situated 5 nautical miles (9.3 km; 5.8 mi) north-northeast of Conard Peak. Mapped by USGS from surveys and United States Navy air photos, 1960-64. Named by US-ACAN for William D. Bridger, United States Navy, aviation machinist's mate and flight engineer on Hercules aircraft at Williams Field, Ross Island, on Operation Deep Freeze 1968.

=== Moraine Ridge ===
72°18′S 168°03′E. A small ridge in the northeast part of Cartographers Range, descending to the southwest flank of Tucker Glacier just south of the junction with Pearl Harbor Glacier. So named by the NZGSAE, 1957-58.

=== Stevenson Peak ===
72°25′S 168°17′E. A peak, 1,780 metres (5,840 ft) high, standing 5 nautical miles (9.3 km; 5.8 mi) west-northwest of Bypass Hill. Mapped by USGS from surveys and United States Navy air photos, 1960-64. Named by US-ACAN for Robert G. Stevenson, geologist at McMurdo Station, 1967-68.

=== Bypass Hill ===
72°28′S 168°28′E. Hill, 660 metres (2,170 ft) high, situated on the ridge at the junction of Tucker and Trafalgar Glaciers. Named by the New Zealand Geological Survey Antarctic Expedition (NZGSAE), 1957-58, who established a survey station at this point.

== Sources ==
- Alberts, Fred G., ed. (1995), Geographic Names of the Antarctic (PDF) (2 ed.), United States Board on Geographic Names This article incorporates public domain material from websites or documents of the United States Board on Geographic Names.
- Cape Hallet, USGS: United States Geographic Board

This article incorporates public domain material from websites or documents of the United States Geological Survey.
