= Destination Nunataks =

Mountain group in Victoria Land, Antarctica

- Location within Antarctica

Geography
- Continent: Antarctica
- Region(s): Victoria Land, Antarctica
- Range coordinates: 72°15′S 165°28′E

The Destination Nunataks (72°15′S 165°28′E) are a group of peaks and nunataks, 9 nautical miles (17 km; 10 mi) long and 4 nautical miles (7.4 km; 4.6 mi) wide, rising to 2,565 metres (8,415 ft) at Pyramid Peak and including Sphinx Peak, Andrews Peak, Mummy Ridge, and unnamed nunataks to the northwest, located in northeast Evans Névé, 7 nautical miles (13 km; 8.1 mi) northwest of the Barker Range, Victoria Land, Antarctica.

== Exploration and naming ==
This group was visited in 1970–71 by a Victoria University of Wellington Antarctic Expedition (VUWAE) geological party led by M.G. Laird. The name "Destination Rocks" was originally used for the feature because these nunataks were near the northern limits of Laird's expedition. The name Destination Nunataks, as approved by the New Zealand Antarctic Place-Names Committee (NZ-APC) and the United States Advisory Committee on Antarctic Names (US-ACAN) in 1985, applies to the entire group described rather than to just two nunataks at the southeast end as indicated on some maps.

== Location ==
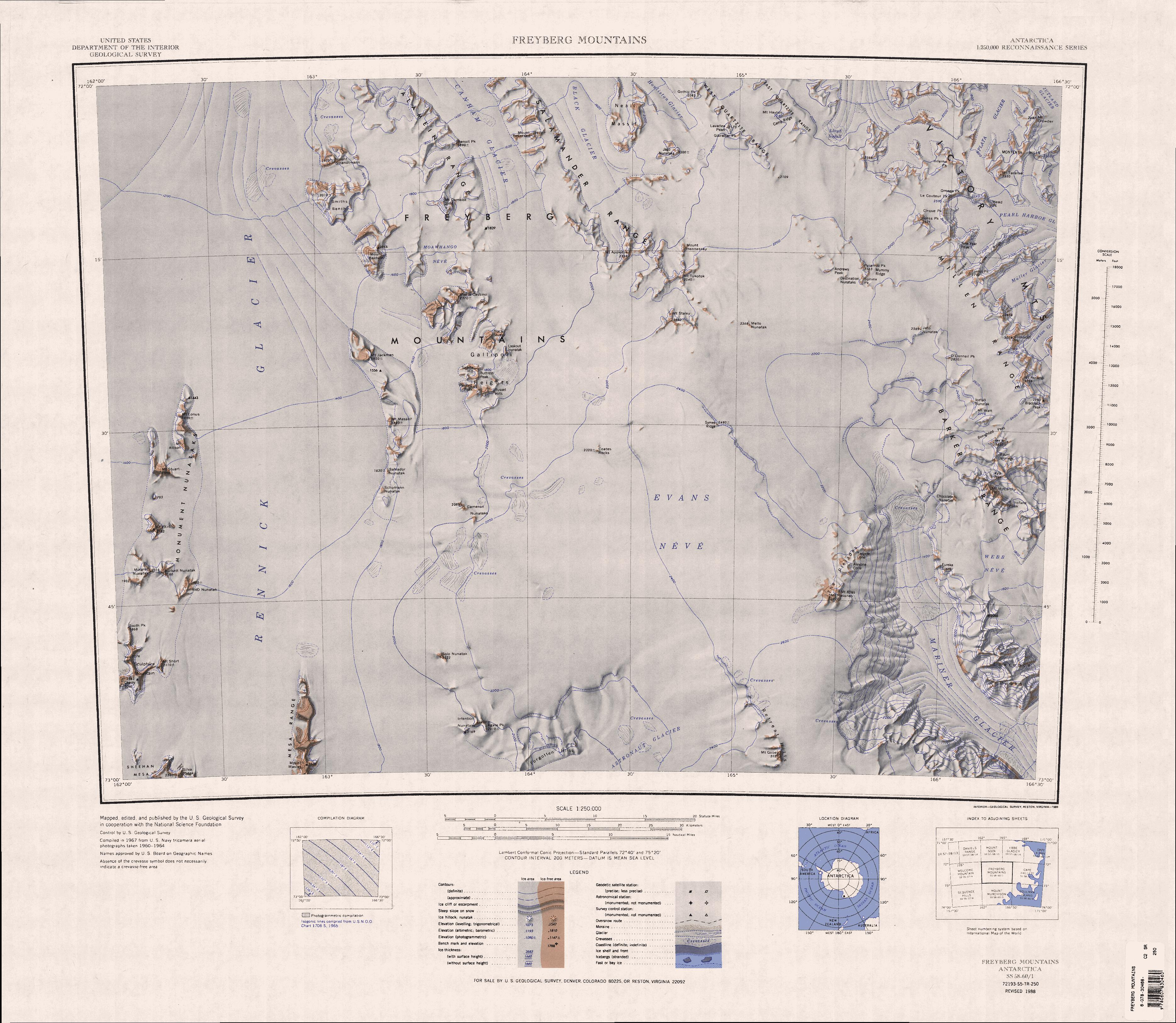
West Quartzite Range east of center in north of map

The Destination Nunataks lie at the end of a ridge extended southeast from the West Quartzite Range. The Millen Range of the Victory Mountains lies to the east, and the Barker Range to the south. Evans Névé is to the southwest. The southern end of the Salamander Range is to the west.

== Features ==
=== Pyramid Peak ===
72°16′S 165°35′E. A peak in the southeast part of the Destination Nunataks, rising to 2,565 metres (8,415 ft) high 1 nautical mile (1.9 km; 1.2 mi) north of Sphinx Peak. Descriptively named by the Northern Party of NZFMCAE, 1962-63.

=== Sphinx Peak ===
72°17′S 165°35′E. A massive summit 1 nautical mile (1.9 km; 1.2 mi) south of Pyramid Peak, in the southeast part of the Destination Nunataks. Named in association with Pyramid Peak by the Northern Party of NZFMCAE, 1962-63.

=== Andrews Peak ===
72°17′S 165°25′E. A peak 2,400 metres (7,900 ft), 3 nautical miles (5.6 km; 3.5 mi) west of Pyramid Peak. Named by the New Zealand Antarctic Place-Names Committee (NZ-APC) after Peter Andrews, geologist with the VUWAE Evans Névé field party, 1971-72, who worked in this area.

=== Mummy Ridge ===
72°16′S 165°39′E. A ridge 1 nautical mile (1.9 km; 1.2 mi) east of Pyramid Peak. The ridge was visited in 1981-82 by Bradley Field, geologist, New Zealand Geological Survey (NZGS), who suggested the name in association with nearby Pyramid Peak and Sphinx Peak.

== Sources ==
- Alberts, Fred G., ed. (1995), Geographic Names of the Antarctic (PDF) (2 ed.), United States Board on Geographic Names This article incorporates public domain material from websites or documents of the United States Board on Geographic Names.
- Freyberg Mountains, USGS: United States Geographic Board

This article incorporates public domain material from websites or documents of the United States Geological Survey.
