= Mount Minto (Antarctica) =

Mountain in Antarctica

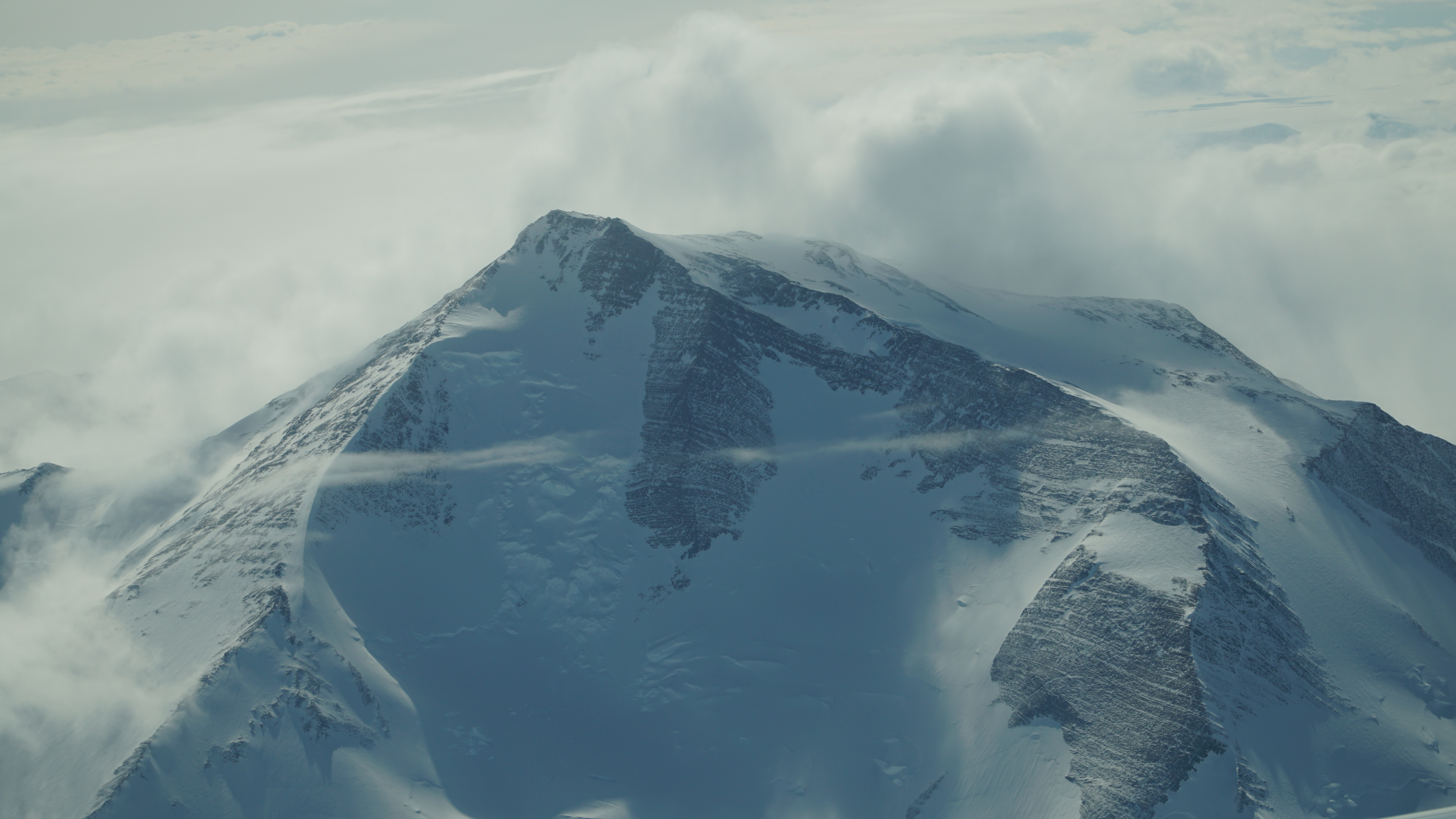
- View of Mount Minto

Highest point
- Elevation: 4,163 m (13,658 ft)
- Prominence: 2,641 m (8,665 ft)
- Listing: Ultra, Ribu
- Coordinates: 71°47′S 168°45′E

Geography
- Location within Antarctica
- Location: Victoria Land, Antarctica
- Parent range: Admiralty Mountains

Mount Minto (71°47′S 168°45′E) is a lofty, mostly ice-free mountain rising to 4,163 metres (13,658 ft), located 2.5 nautical miles (4.6 km; 2.9 mi) east of Mount Adam in the central portion of the Admiralty Mountains, Victoria Land, Antarctica.

== Discovery and name ==
Mount Minto was discovered in January 1841 by Captain James Clark Ross, Royal Navy, who named it for Gilbert Elliot-Murray-Kynynmound, 2nd Earl of Minto, then First Lord of the Admiralty.

== Location ==
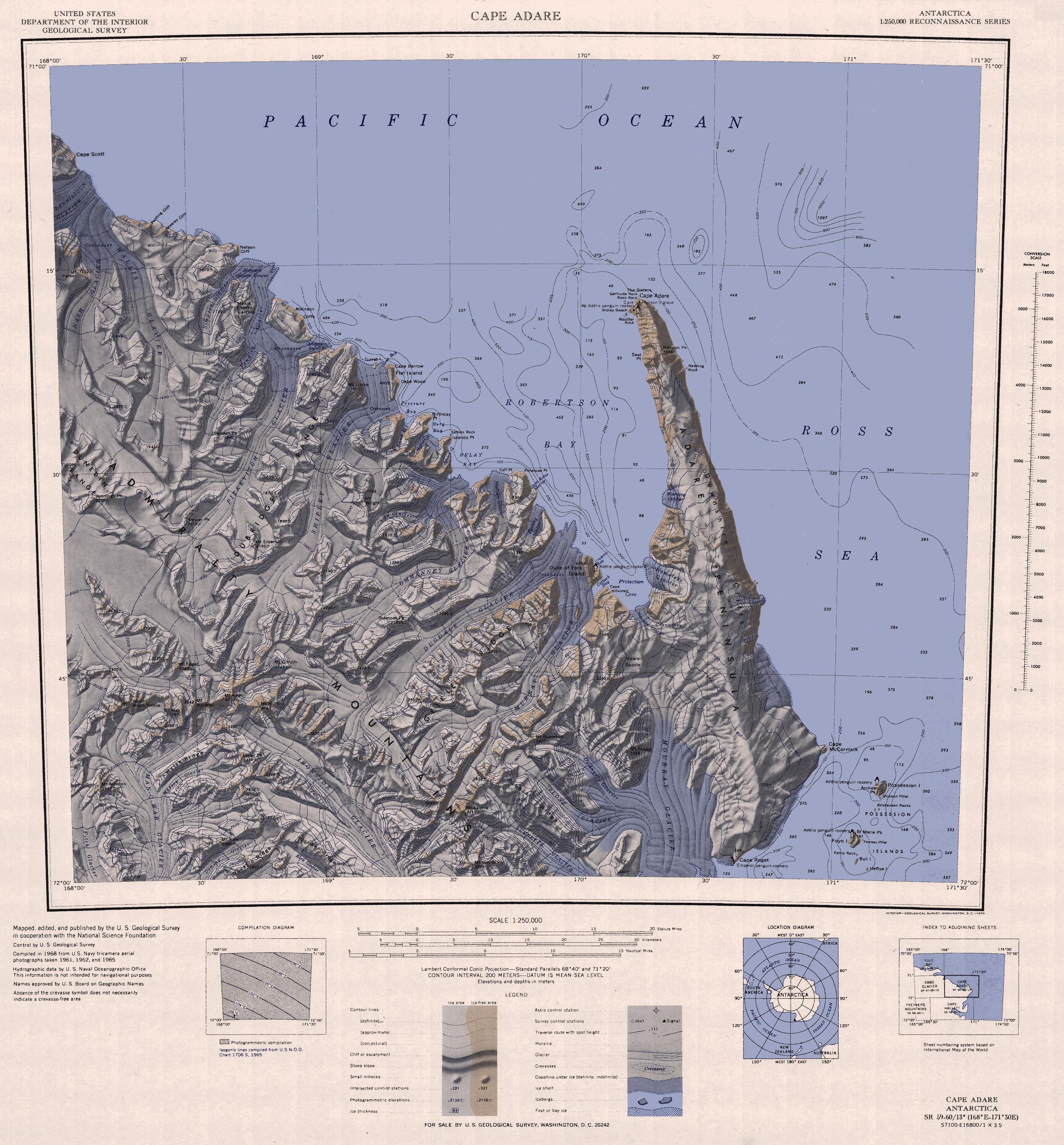
Mount Minto in southwest

Mount Minto is at the head of the Ironside Glacier, which flows southeast, and to the east of the head of the Man-o-War Glacier, which flows west and then south. The Dugdale Glacier receives ice from its north face. Nearby features to the south include Mount Achilles, Wylie Ridge, and Meier Peak. Features to the west include Mount Black Prince, Mount Ajax, Mount Royalist and Mount Adam. Features to the north include Mount Faget and Mount Gilruth.

== Nearby features ==
=== Mount Achilles ===
71°53′S 168°08′E. A prominent pyramidal mountain 2,880 metres (9,450 ft) high rising from the divide between Fitch Glacier and Man-o-War Glacier. Named by New Zealand Geological Survey Antarctic Expedition (NZGSAE), 1957-58, after the former New Zealand cruiser HMNZS Achilles.

=== Meier Peak ===
71°51′S 168°40′E. A peak 3,450 metres (11,320 ft) high rising at the south side of the head of Ironside Glacier, 4 nautical miles (7.4 km; 4.6 mi) south-southwest of Mount Minto. Mapped by the United States Geological Survey (USGS) from surveys and United States Navy air photos, 1960-63. Named by the United States Advisory Committee on Antarctic Names (US-ACAN) for Lieutenant Commander Miron D. Meier, United States Navy Reserve, helicopter pilot with Squadron VX-6 during Operation Deep Freeze 1967 and 1968.

=== Wylie Ridge ===
71°51′S 168°27′E. A ridge that extends westward from Meier Peak. It parallels the north side of Massey Glacier for 6 nautical miles (11 km; 6.9 mi) and terminates at Man-o-War Glacier. Mapped by USGS from surveys and U.S. Navy air photos, 1960-63. Named by US-ACAN for Lieutenant Commander Ronald P. Wylie, USN, pilot with Squadron VX-6 during Operation Deep Freeze 1967 and 1968.

=== Mount Black Prince ===
71°47′S 168°15′E. A mountain 3,405 metres (11,171 ft) high composed of dark colored rock, which tends to create an imposing appearance. Located 4 nautical miles (7.4 km; 4.6 mi) west of Mount Ajax. Named by NZGSAE, 1957-58, for its appearance and also for the New Zealand Cruiser HMNZS Black Prince.

=== Mount Ajax ===
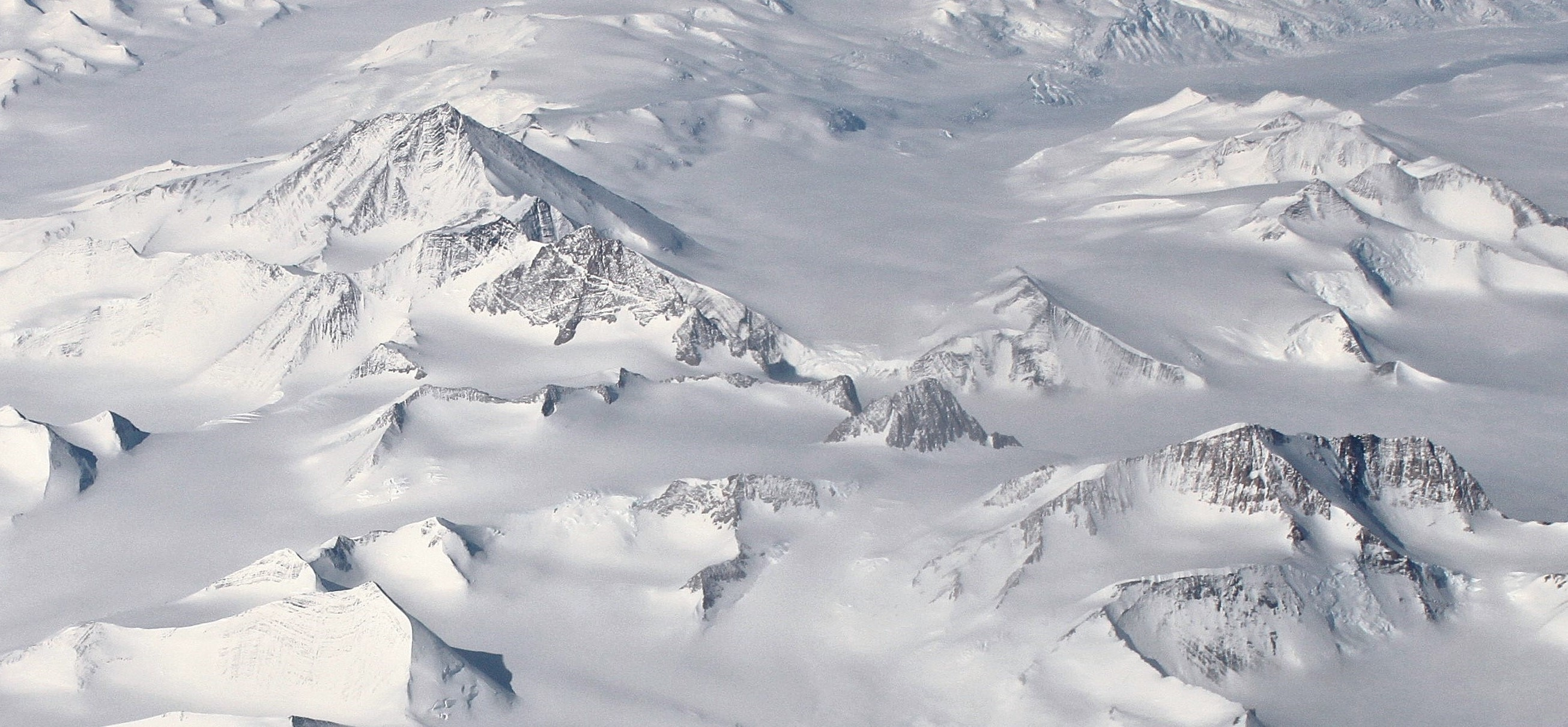
Mount Minto in upper left and Mount Ajax in lower right

71°48′S 168°27′E. A mountain 3,770 metres (12,370 ft) high rising 1 nautical mile (1.9 km; 1.2 mi) west-southwest of Mount Royalist. Named by the NZGSAE, 1957-58, after HMNZS Ajax. The mountain is one of several in this area named for New Zealand ships.

=== Mount Royalist ===
71°47′S 168°30′E. A prominent mountain 3,640 metres (11,940 ft) high standing 2 nautical miles (3.7 km; 2.3 mi) west of Mount Adam. Named by the NZGSAE, 1957-58, for its impressive appearance and also for the New Zealand cruiser HMNZS Royalist. Several adjacent peaks are named for New Zealand ships.

=== Mount Adam ===
71°47′S 168°37′E. A mountain 4,010 metres (13,160 ft) high situated 2.5 nautical miles (4.6 km; 2.9 mi) west-northwest of Mount Minto. Discovered in January 1841 by Captain James Clark Ross, Royal Navy, who named this feature for V. Admiral Sir Charles Adam, a senior naval lord of the Admiralty.

=== Mount Eos ===
71°42′S 168°38′E. A mountain with a bare summit rising to about 2,600 metres (8,500 ft) high, 4.5 nautical miles (8.3 km; 5.2 mi) north of Mount Adam. Visited in 1981-82 by Bradley Field, geologist, NZGS, who suggested the name because the area provided excellent views of dawns and sunsets. In Greek mythology, Eos is the goddess of dawn.

=== Mount Faget ===
71°44′S 168°26′E. A mountain 3,360 metres (11,020 ft) high 4 nautical miles (7.4 km; 4.6 mi) northwest of Mount Adam. Mapped by USGS from surveys and United States Navy air photos, 1960-63. Named by US-ACAN for Maxime A. Faget of the National Aeronautics and Space Administration, a visitor at McMurdo Station, 1966-67.

=== Mount Gilruth ===
71°44′S 168°48′E. A mostly ice-covered mountain 3,160 metres (10,370 ft) high 4.5 nautical miles (8.3 km; 5.2 mi) east-northeast of Mount Adam. Mapped by USGS from surveys and United States Navy air photos, 1960-63. Named by US-ACAN for Robert R. Gilruth of the National Aeronautics and Space Administration, a visitor at McMurdo Station, 1966-67.

=== Stamper Peak ===
71°41′S 169°19′E. A peak 2,180 metres (7,150 ft) high, 10 nautical miles (19 km; 12 mi) east-northeast of Mount Gilruth. It rises from the south-central part of the ridge separating Dugdale Glacier and Ommanney Glacier. Mapped by the USGS from surveys and U.S. Navy air photos, 1960-63. Named by US-ACAN for Wilburn E. Stamper, RM2, USN, radioman at McMurdo Station, 1967.

== Sources ==
- Alberts, Fred G., ed. (1995), Geographic Names of the Antarctic (PDF) (2 ed.), United States Board on Geographic Names This article incorporates public domain material from websites or documents of the United States Board on Geographic Names.
- Cape Adare, USGS: United States Geographic Board

This article incorporates public domain material from websites or documents of the United States Geological Survey.
