= Moubray Bay =

Bay in the western Ross Sea, Antarctica

- Location within Antarctica
- Location: Victoria Land
- Coordinates: 72°11′S 170°15′E

Moubray Bay (72°11′S 170°15′E) is a bay in the western Ross Sea, indenting the coast of Victoria Land, Antarctica, between Cape Roget and Cape Hallett. It was discovered in 1841 by Sir James Clark Ross and named by him for George H. Moubray, clerk in charge of the expedition ship Terror.

== Location ==
Cape Roget, the northern point of the bay, is the southern point on the Adare Peninsula. To the west of Cape Roget the Moubray Glacier flows south to the bay from the Adare Saddle. The DeAngelo Glacier and Slone Glacier are its tributaries, running southeast from the Admiralty Mountains. To their south, past Quartermain Point the Burnette Glacier enters the bay. Further south, past Honeycomb Ridge, Copper Cove, Helm Point and Hedgehog Island, the Honeycomb Glacier and Ironside Glacier flow into the bay. The Kirk Glacier is a right tributary of the Ironside Glacier. South of this is Cape Christie at the entrance to Edisto Inlet, which is fed by the Manhaul Glacier and Edisto Glacier, which flows past Tombstone Hill and Felsite Island. The Hallett Peninsula forms the southeast side of Edisto Inlet, with Hallett Station and Cape Hallett at its northern extreme.

== Seal population ==
The seal populations in Edisto Inlet/Moubray Bay and in McMurdo Sound further south were counted in 2008–2012 using high-resolution satellite images, and compared to ground counts made in 1959–1968. There are now very few breeding seals in Edisto/Moubray, although the population of breeding seals in McMurdo Sound seems to have bounced back from seal harvesting in the 1960s. The reasons are not clear, but may be due to changes in available food, which may in turn be due to industrial fishery or possibly to changes in extent of pack ice and fast ice.

== Glaciers ==
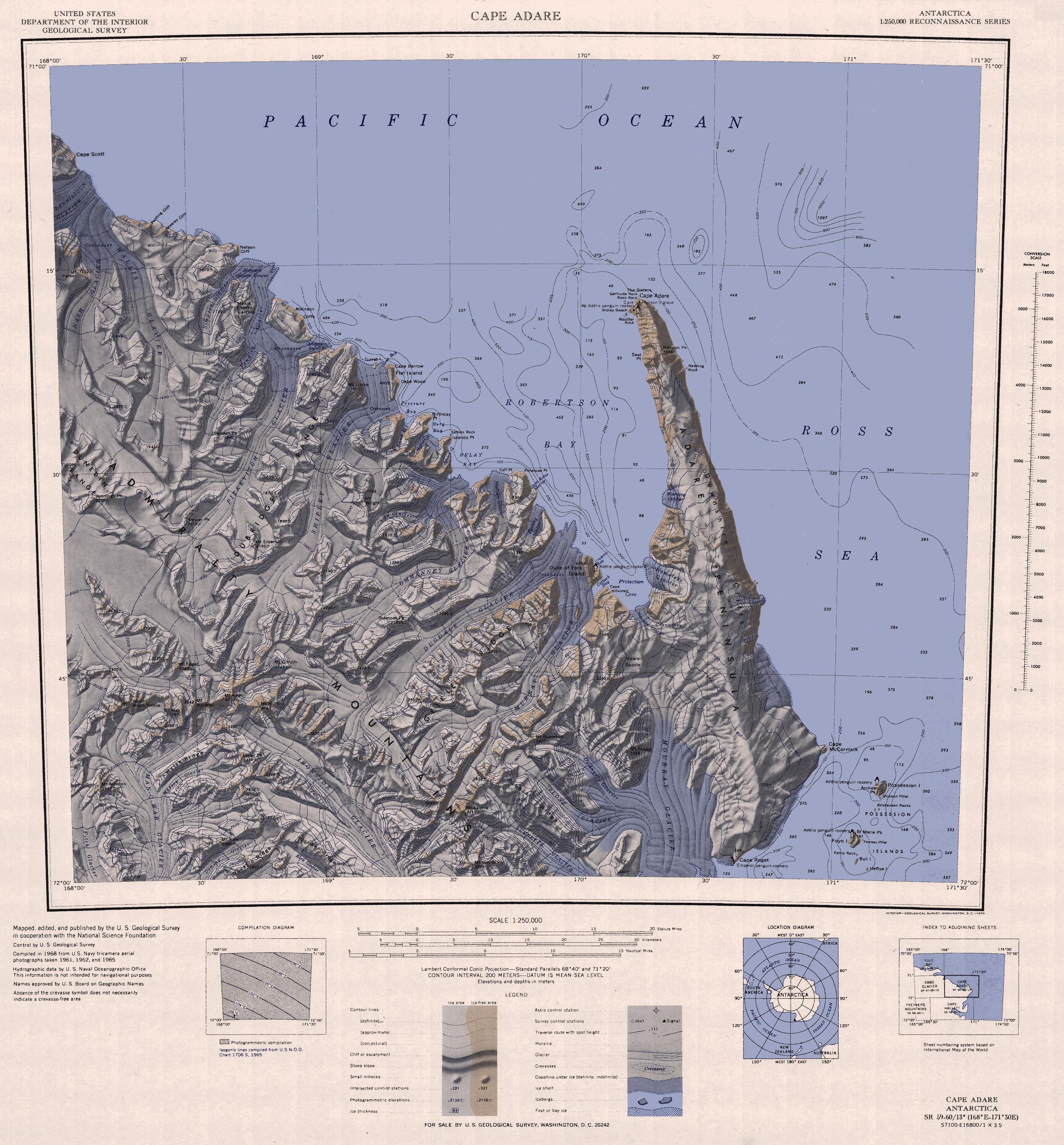
Region to the north of the bay

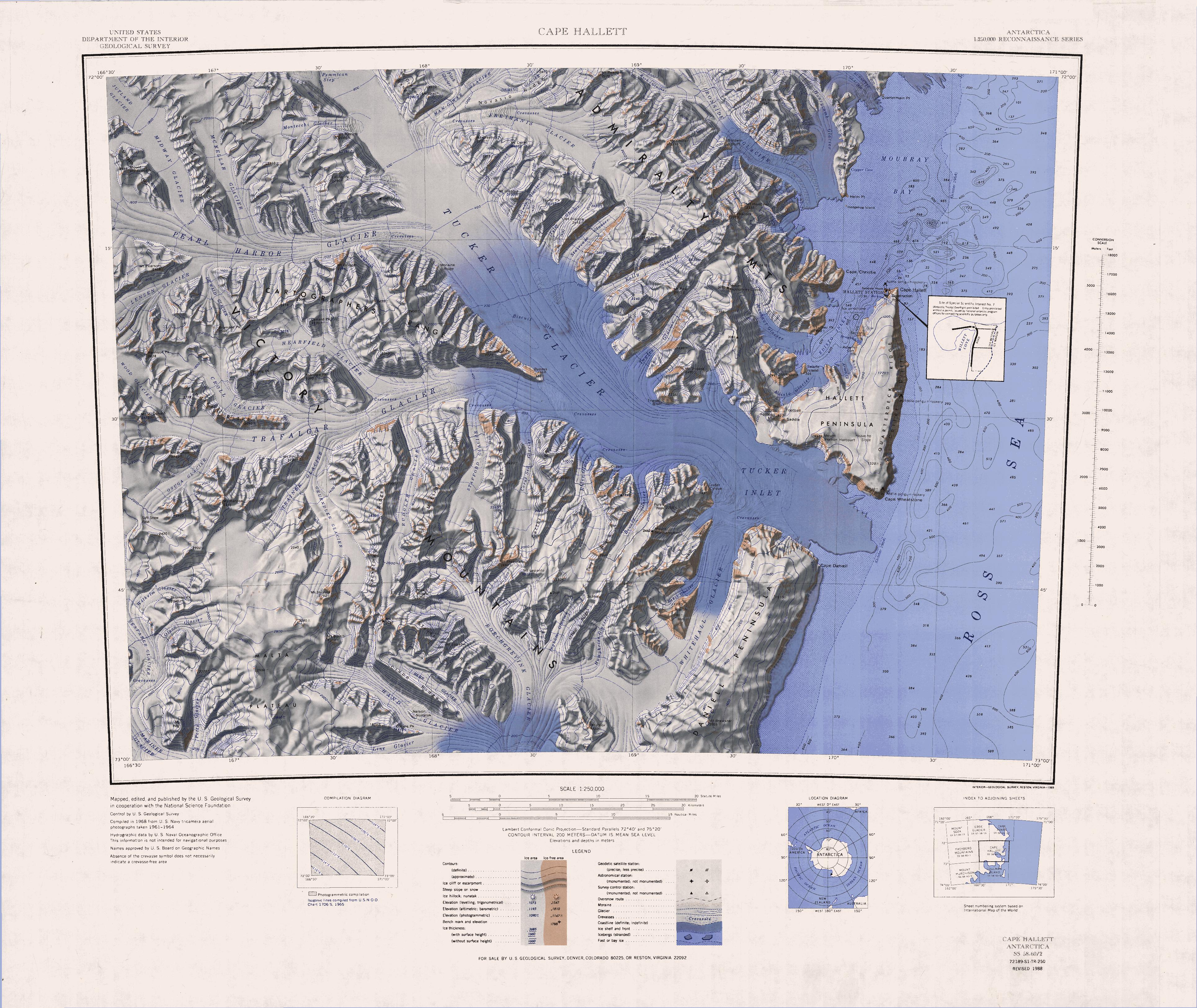
Moubray Bay to northeast of map

Glaciers entering the bay, anti-clockwise from the north, include:

=== Moubray Glacier ===
71°52′S 170°18′E. A rather steep glacier flowing south to Moubray Bay from Adare Saddle on Adare Peninsula. It is one of the main contributors of ice to Moubray Piedmont Glacier. Named by the New Zealand Geological Survey Antarctic Expedition (NZGSAE), 1957–58, for its proximity to Moubray Bay.

=== Moubray Piedmont Glacier ===
71°55′S 170°20′E. A piedmont glacier filling the north part of Moubray Bay, formed by the confluence of Moubray Glacier and ice streams falling from the west side of the south end of Adare Peninsula. The greater part of it is probably afloat. Named by the NZGSAE, 1957-58, for Moubray Bay.

=== DeAngelo Glacier ===
71°54′S 170°10′E. Tributary glacier which drains the slopes of Mount Robinson in the Admiralty Mountains. It flows southeast to enter Moubray Glacier southward of Mount Ruegg. Mapped by United States Geological Survey (USGS) from surveys and United States Navy air photos, 1960-63. Named by United States Advisory Committee on Antarctic Names (US-ACAN) for Richard J. DeAngelo, Airman First-Class, United States Air Force, who perished in the C-124 Globemaster crash in this vicinity in 1958.

=== Slone Glacier ===
71°56′S 170°03′E. A glacier descending along the north side of Slagle Ridge in the Admiralty Mountains to enter the west side of Moubray Glacier. Mapped by the USGS from surveys and United States Navy air photos, 1960-63. Named by the US-ACAN for Airman Kelly Slone, USAF, who perished in the crash of a C-154 Globemaster aircraft in this vicinity in 1958.

=== Burnette Glacier ===
72°01′S 170°03′E. Steep glacier in the Admiralty Mountains, flowing southeast between Honeycomb Ridge and Quartermain Point into Moubray Bay. Mapped by the USGS from surveys and United States Navy air photos, 1960-62. Named by the US-ACAN for Airman 2nd Class Robert L. Burnette, USAF, who perished in a crash of a C-124 Globemaster in this vicinity in 1958.

=== Honeycomb Glacier ===
72°07′S 169°52′E. Glacier which drains the north and east sides of the mountainous mass surmounted by Mount Whewell, then flows south between that feature and Honeycomb Ridge to Moubray Bay. Named by the NZGSAE, 1957-58, for its proximity to Honeycomb Ridge.

=== Whewell Glacier ===
72°04′S 169°47′E. A narrow, steep glacier that drains the east slopes of Mount Whewell and merges with the lower part of Honeycomb Glacier. Mapped by USGS from surveys and U.S. Navy air photos, 1960-64. Named by US-ACAN in association with Mount Whewell.

=== Ironside Glacier ===
72°08′S 169°40′E. A spectacular glacier, about 30 nautical miles (56 km; 35 mi) long, originating at the south side of Mount Minto in the Admiralty Mountains and draining southeast between Mount Whewell and Mount Herschel into Moubray Bay. At its mouth it is joined by the Honeycomb Glacier flowing in from the north. The name is suggested by an association of ideas involved in the name Admiralty Mountains, and by the impression of power given by the great icefall in the lower portion of the glacier. Named by the NZGSAE, 1957-58.

=== Fischer Ridge ===
71°58′S 169°00′E. An ice-covered ridge trending northwest–southeast between Kirk Glacier and Ironside Glacier. Named by US-ACAN for William H. Fischer, Atmospheric Chemist at McMurdo Station, 1966-67.

=== Baldwin Bluff ===
72°06′S 169°27′E. A rock bluff along the southwest side of Ironside Glacier, about 5 nautical miles (9.3 km; 5.8 mi) southwest of the summit of Mount Whewell. Mapped by USGS from surveys and U.S. Navy air photos, 1960-64. Named by US-ACAN for Howard A. Baldwin, biologist at McMurdo Station, 1966-67.

=== Kirk Glacier ===
72°02′S 169°09′E. A tributary glacier draining southeast along the south side of Fischer Ridge into Ironside Glacier, in the Admiralty Mountains. Mapped by USGS from surveys and United States Navy air photos, 1960-64. Named by US-ACAN for Edward Kirk, United States Navy, commissaryman at McMurdo Station, 1967.

=== Manhaul Glacier ===
72°24′S 169°45′E. A glacier flowing from the east slopes of Mount Humphrey Lloyd to enter Edisto Inlet just south of Luther Peak, in Victoria Land. So named by NZGSAE, 1957-58, because the seaward tongue of this glacier which is afloat was crossed several times during the season by NZGSAE parties using man-hauling methods of transport.

=== Edisto Glacier ===
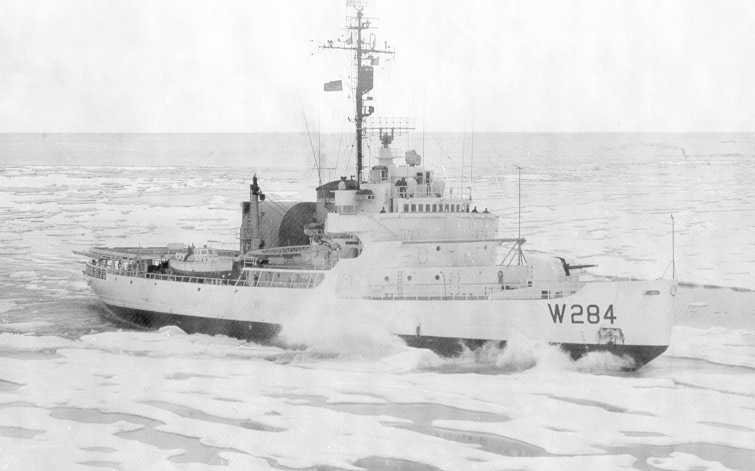
USS Edisto

72°27′S 169°53′E. Glacier flowing northeast between Felsite Island and Redcastle Ridge into the head of Edisto Inlet. Named by the NZGSAE, 1957-58, for the USS Edisto, first vessel to visit the Edisto Inlet area.

== Other features ==
Other features, anti-clockwise from the north, include:

=== Quartermain Point ===
72°03′S 170°08′E. Prominent point in the north part of Moubray Bay between Helm Point and Cape Roget. Named by the NZGSAE, 1957-58, for L.B. Quartermain, president, New Zealand Antarctic Society, who took a close interest in the work of the expedition.

=== Honeycomb Ridge ===
72°05′S 169°58′E. Ridge which extends north from the mouth of Ironside Glacier on the west side of Moubray Bay. So named by the NZGSAE, 1957-58, because it consists mainly of a granitic rock which in many places is honeycombed on exposed surfaces by holes and cavities.

=== Copper Cove ===
72°09′S 170°00′E. Small cove 2 nautical miles (3.7 km; 2.3 mi) north of Helm Point, indenting the east side of Honeycomb Ridge at the west margin of Moubray Bay. So named by the NZGSAE, 1957-58, because its cliffs are in places stained green by the weathering products of copper ores.

=== Helm Point ===
72°11′S 170°00′E. Point which marks the southeast tip of Honeycomb Ridge on the west side of Moubray Bay. It consists of brown granodiorite and supports a relatively luxuriant vegetation of lichens and mosses, along with nests of snow petrels and Wilson's petrel. Two Japanese whalechasers, apparently familiar with the site, dropped anchor there for two nights early in February 1958. Named by the NZGSAE, 1957-58, for Arthur S. Helm, Secretary, Ross Sea Committee, who gave much assistance to the expedition. Helm was Secretary of the New Zealand Antarctic Place Names Committee, 1957-64.

=== Hedgehog Island ===
72°12′S 170°00′E. Small, bare granite island, or stack, in Moubray Bay, 1 nautical mile (1.9 km; 1.2 mi) south of Heim Point. It was first visited in 1957 by a small party from Hallett station. So named by the NZGSAE, 1957-58, because of its shape.

=== Luther Peak ===
72°22′S 169°50′E. Peak, 820 metres (2,690 ft) high, standing 11 nautical miles (20 km; 13 mi) southeast of Mount Peacock in the Admiralty Mountains and overlooking Edisto Inlet. Charted from radarscope photographs taken in March 1956 by members of United States Navy OpDFrz I aboard the USS Edisto. Named by the US-ACAN for Commander Roger W. Luther, United States Navy, captain of the Edisto.

=== Edisto Inlet ===
72°20′S 170°05′E. Rectangular arm of Moubray Bay, 7 nautical miles (13 km; 8.1 mi) long and 3 nautical miles (5.6 km; 3.5 mi) wide, entered between Cape Hallett and Cape Christie. The USS Edisto (Commander Roger W. Luther) was the first ship to enter this branch of Moubray Bay in February 1956, and the name Edisto Bay was given at that time. Edisto Inlet has overtaken the earlier name in usage.

=== Tombstone Hill ===
72°27′S 169°42′E. A prominent hill, 1,050 metres (3,440 ft) high, on the north side of Edisto Glacier in the Admiralty Mountainsd. Its summit is littered with slabs of hard sedimentary rock, many of which are steeply tilted on end to give the appearance of a field of tombstones. Named by NZGSAE, 1957-58.

=== Felsite Island ===
72°26′S 169°49′E. A rock island 1 nautical mile (1.9 km; 1.2 mi) long and 300 metres (980 ft) high, lying at the head of Edisto Inlet within the northward stream of Edisto Glacier. Named by the NZGSAE, 1957-58, as descriptive of several prominent dikes of cream-colored igneous rocks (felsite) in its otherwise dark sedimentary rock formation.

== Sources ==
- Ainley, David G.; Larue, Michelle A.; Stirling, Ian; Stammerjohn, Sharon; Siniff, Donald B. (2 April 2015), An apparent population decrease, or change in distribution, of Weddell seals along the Victoria Land coast, doi:10.1111/mms.12220
- Alberts, Fred G., ed. (1995), Geographic Names of the Antarctic (PDF) (2 ed.), United States Board on Geographic Names This article incorporates public domain material from websites or documents of the United States Board on Geographic Names.
- Cape Adare, USGS: United States Geological Survey
- Cape Hallet, USGS: United States Geological Survey

This article incorporates public domain material from websites or documents of the United States Geological Survey.
