= McGregor Range (Antarctica) =

Mountain range in Antarctica

- Location within Antarctica

Highest point
- Coordinates: 71°58′S 167°51′E

Geography
- Location: Victoria Land, Antarctica
- Parent range: Admiralty Mountains

The McGregor Range (71°58′S 167°51′E) is a mountain range 13 nautical miles (24 km; 15 mi) long in the south-central Admiralty Mountains, Antarctica. The range is circumscribed by the flow of the Tucker Glacier, Leander Glacier, Fitch Glacier and Man-o-War Glacier.

== Exploration and naming ==
The McGregor Range was partially mapped by the NZGSAE, 1957–58. It was mapped by the United States Geological Survey (USGS) from surveys and U.S. Navy aerial photography, 1960–63. It was named by the United States Advisory Committee on Antarctic Names (US-ACAN) for Cdr. Ronald K. McGregor, United States Navy, leader of Antarctic Support Activities at McMurdo Station, winter party 1962.

== Location ==
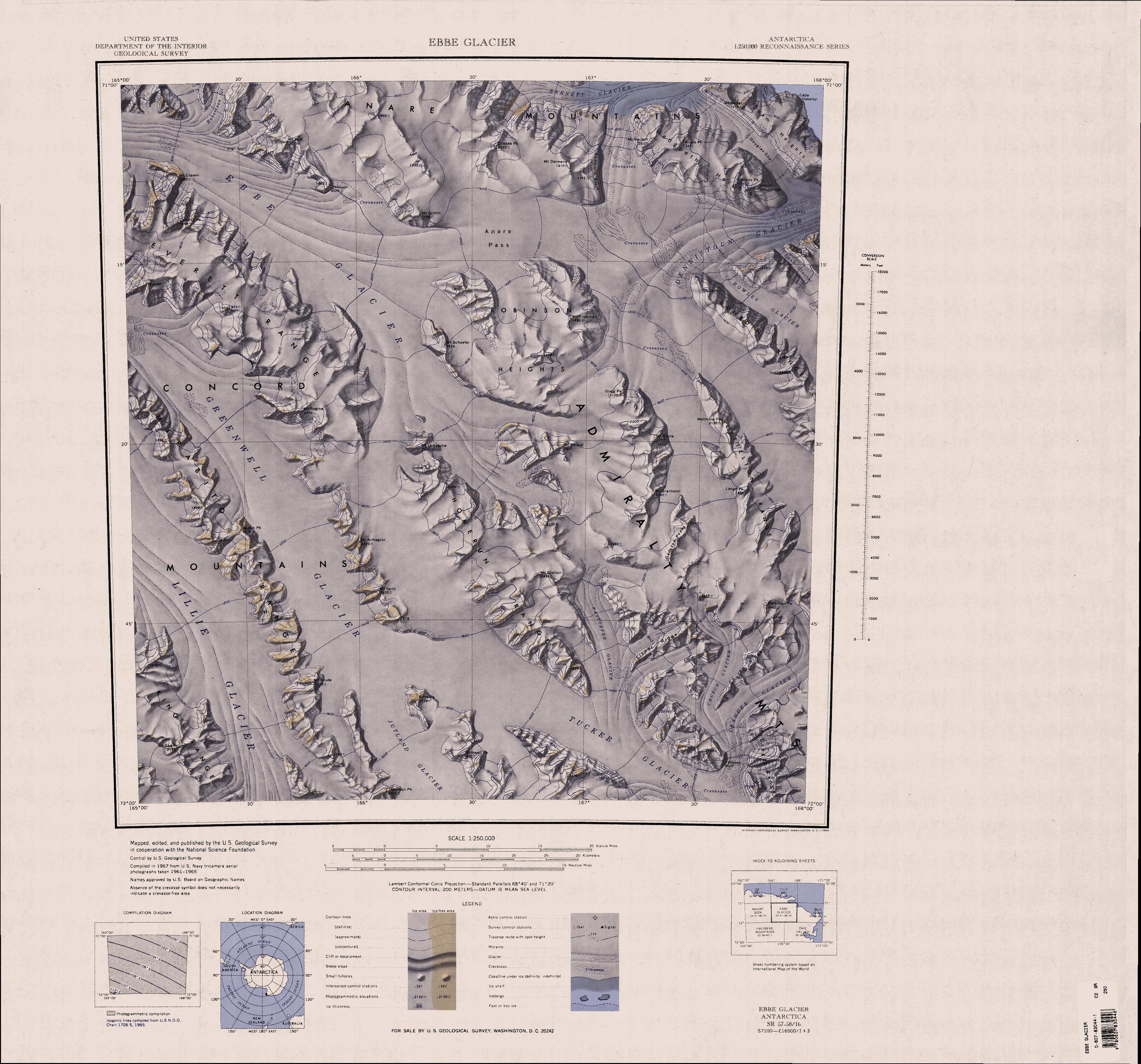
McGregor Range in extreme southeast of map

The McGregor Range extends north–south to the west of Fitch Glacier, which runs south to join Man-o-War Glacier, which in turn runs southwest to join Tucker Glacier. On its east the range is bounded by Leander Glacier, which runs along its north and west sides to join Tucker Glacier. Mount Brazil is in the south of the range.

== Features ==
=== Mount Brazil ===
72°03′S 167°59′E. A mountain 2,090 metres (6,860 ft) high at the south end of McGregor Range. Mapped by USGS from surveys and United States Navy air photos, 1960–62. Named by US-ACAN for Chief Warrant Officer John D. Brazil, United States Army, helicopter pilot supporting the USGS Topo North-South party that surveyed the area, 1961–62.

== Nearby features ==
=== Shadow Bluff ===
71°57′S 167°38′E. A rock bluff just west of McGregor Range, at the junction of the Tucker and Leander Glaciers. It is a landmark when sledging on the Tucker Glacier, and is nearly always in shadow, hence the name. Named by the New Zealand Geological Survey Antarctic Expedition (NZGSAE), 1957–58.

=== Mount Shadow ===
71°56′S 167°31′E. A small peak in the Admiralty Mountains that rises above and close west of Shadow Bluff at the junction of the Tucker Glacier and Leander Glacier. Climbed by the geological team of the NZGSAE, 1957-58, in January 1958, and named from association with Shadow Bluff and nearby Mount Midnight.

=== Mount Midnight ===
71°56′S 167°28′E. A peak nearly 2,000 metres (6,600 ft) high, standing on the north side of Tucker Glacier, 3.5 nautical miles (6.5 km; 4.0 mi) west of Shadow Bluff. Climbed by a geological team of the NZGSAE, 1957-58, in January 1958. Named by them in association with Mount Shadow, just eastward, and Shadow Bluff.

== Sources ==
- Alberts, Fred G., ed. (1995), Geographic Names of the Antarctic (PDF) (2 ed.), United States Board on Geographic Names This article incorporates public domain material from websites or documents of the United States Board on Geographic Names.
- Cape Adare, USGS: United States Geographic Board
- Cape Hallet, USGS: United States Geological Survey
- Ebbe Glacier, USGS: United States Geographic Board

This article incorporates public domain material from websites or documents of the United States Geological Survey.
