= Cape Roget =

Headland of Antarctica

Coordinates: 71°59′17″S 170°36′04″E

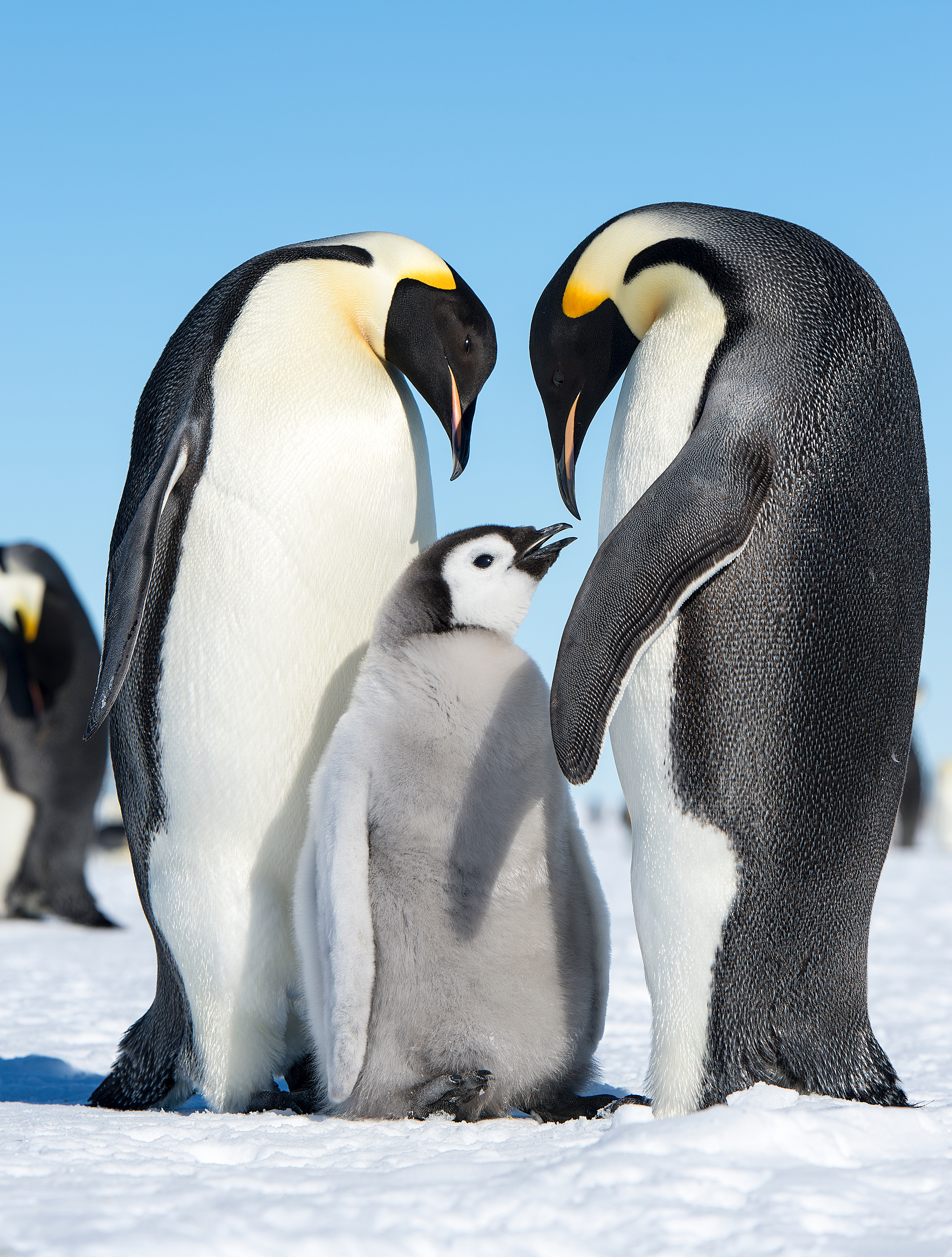
Emperor penguins breed in the Important Bird Area of Cape Roget

Cape Roget is a steep rock cape at the southern end of the east coast of the Adare Peninsula, marking the northern side of the entrance to Moubray Bay, in northern Victoria Land, Antarctica. It was discovered in 1841 by Captain James Clark Ross, who named it for Peter Mark Roget, British physician, lexicographer and Secretary of the Royal Society.

== Important Bird Area ==
A 371 ha site of sea ice at the northern entrance to Moubray Bay has been designated an Important Bird Area (IBA) by BirdLife International because it supports a colony of about 9,000 breeding pairs of emperor penguins, according to estimates based on 2009 satellite imagery.
