= Tucker Glacier =

Glacier in Antarctica

- Location within Antarctica
- Type: Outlet glacier
- Location: East Antarctica
- Coordinates: 72°32′S 169°15′E
- Terminus: Ross Sea

Tucker Glacier (72°32′S 169°15′E) is a major valley glacier of Victoria Land, Antarctica, about 90 nautical miles (170 km; 100 mi) long, flowing southeast between the Admiralty Mountains and the Victory Mountains to the Ross Sea. There is a snow saddle at the glacier's head, just west of Homerun Range, from which the Ebbe Glacier flows northwestward.

== Exploration and naming ==
Explored by New Zealand Geological Survey Antarctic Expedition (NZGSAE), 1957–58, and named by them after Tucker Inlet, the ice-filled coastal indentation at the mouth of this glacier named by Captain James Clark Ross in 1841.

== Geography ==
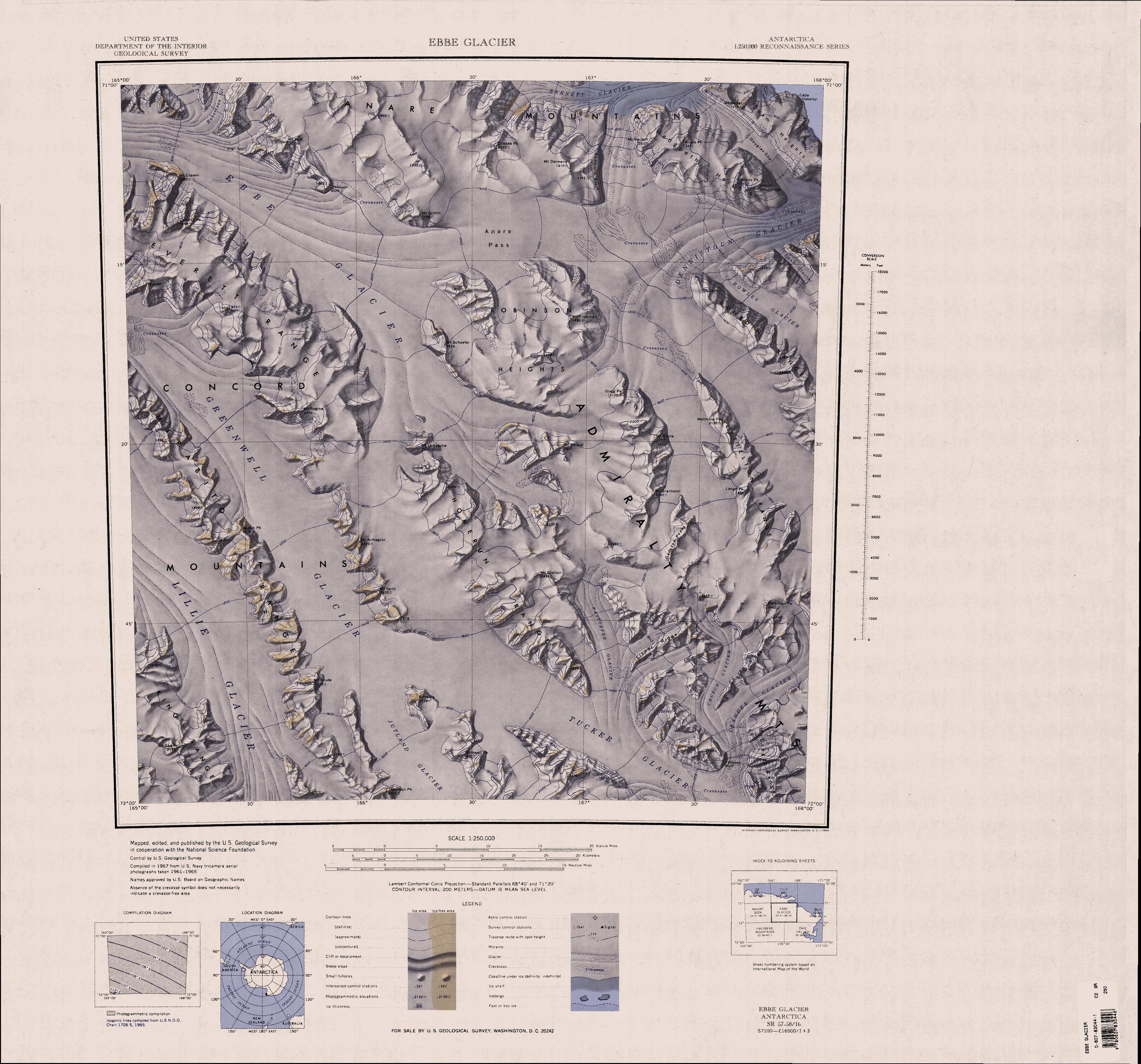
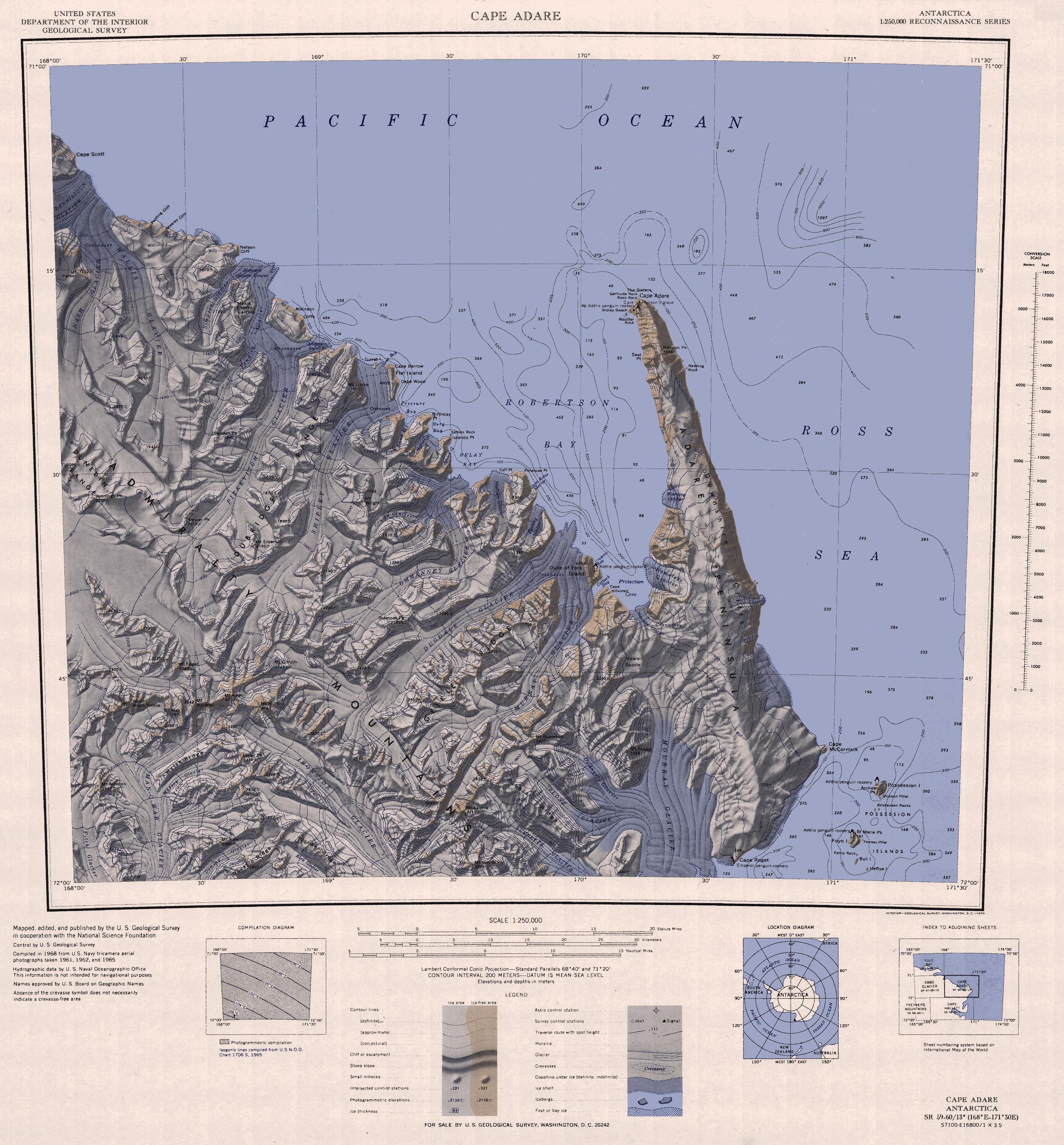
Upper section
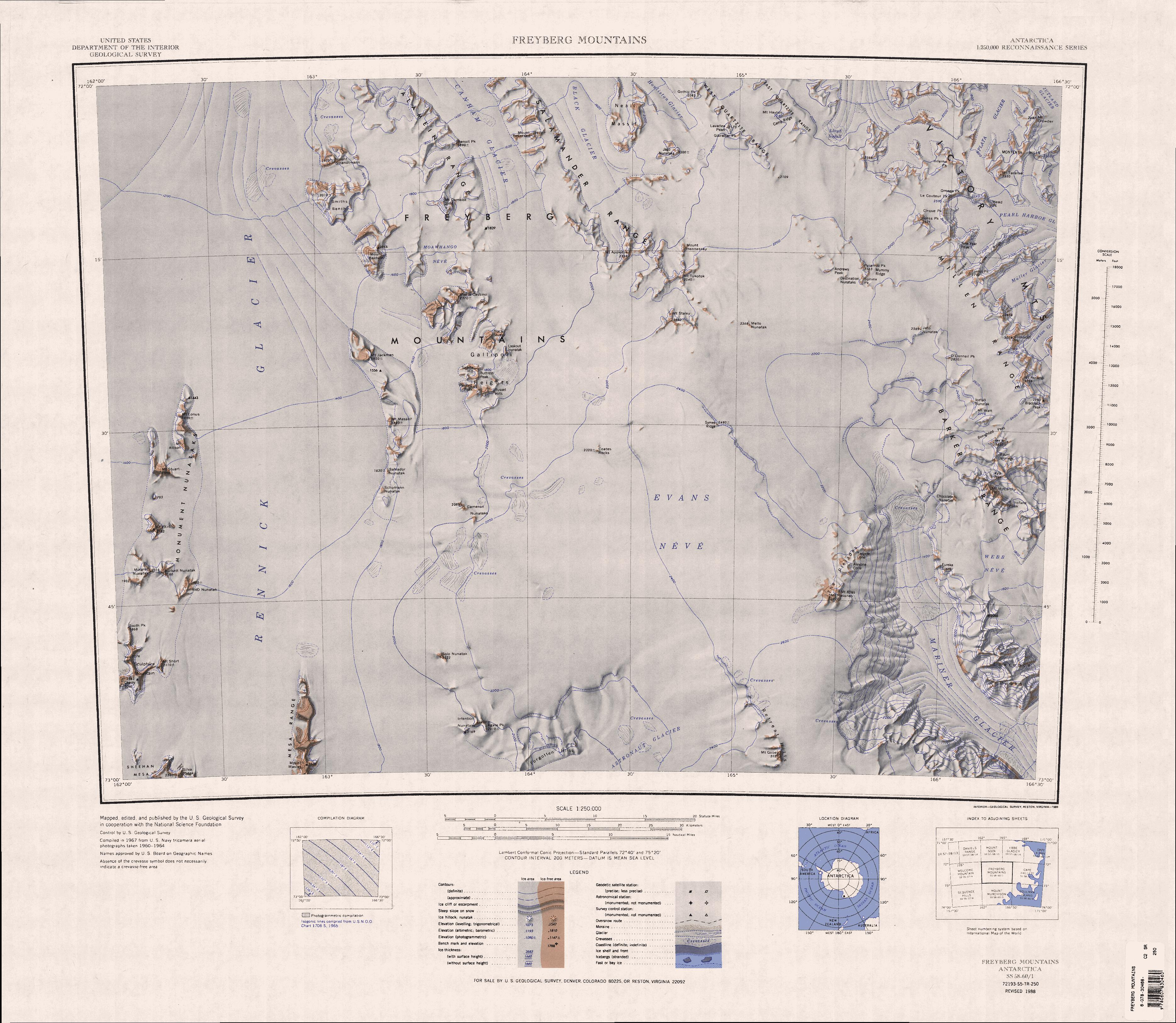
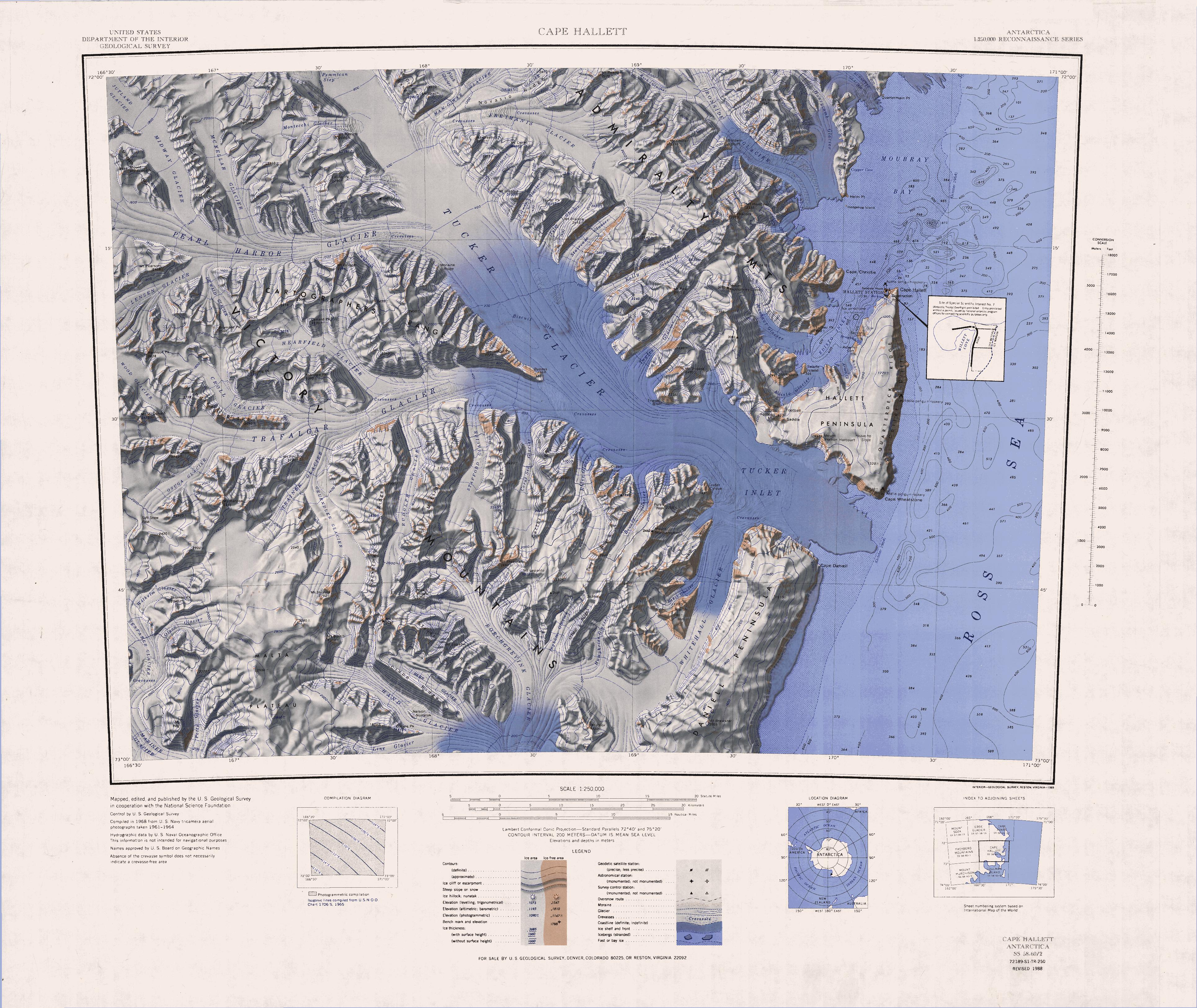
Mouth of the glacier to the east

The upper reaches of the Tucker Glacier south of the Homerun Range saddle with the Greenwell Glacier and Jutland Glacier, in the Lillie Glacier basin. The Tucker Glacier is fed by the Rastorfer Glacier from the left (north) and then by the Leander Glacier after it has been joined by the Church Glacier. South of the McGregor Range the Man-O-War Glacier enters from the northeast, combined with the Freimanis Glacier from the east. Tributaries of the Man-O-War Glacier include the Massey Glacier, Deming Glacier and Fitch Glacier. Tributaries of the Tucker Glacier from the Admiralty Mountains to the east below the Freimants Glacier include the Tocci Glacier, Helman Glacier, Tyler Glacier, Staircase Glacier, Kelly Glacier and Towles Glacier.

To the south of the Pemmican Step, the Montecchi Glacier enters from the west. South of that the Pearl Harbor Glacier enters the Tucker Glacier from the west, flowing to the north of the Cartographers Range. The Muller Glacier is an upper tributary of the Pearl Harbor Glacier, both forming in the Millen Range. Lower down the Lensen Glacier and DeWald Glacier join the Pearl Harbor Glacier from the south, while the Midway Glacier, McKellar Glacier and Summers Glacier join the Pearl Harbor Glacier from the north.

The Trafalgar Glacier is a major contributor from the west, flowing to the south of the Cartographers Range. Tributaries of the Trafalgar Glacier from the south include the Osuga Glacier, Trainer Glacier after its confluence with the Gruendler Glacier, Rudolph Glacier, Stafford Glacier and Coral Sea Glacier. Tributaries of the Trafalgar Glacier from the north include the Wood Glacier, Croll Glacier, Hearfield Glacier and Coulson Glacier. To the west of its mouth the glacier receives the Coral Sea Glacier, Elder Glacier and Bowers Glacier from the south. At its mouth the glacier flows into the Tucker Inlet. The Whitehall Glacier, with its tributary the Baker Glacier, also flow into the Tucker Inlet from the west.

== Left Tributaries ==
Tributaries from the left (northeast) include:

=== Rastorfer Glacier ===
71°50′S 167°06′E. Glacier draining south from the Admiralty Mountains and entering upper Tucker Glacier just east of Homerun Range. Mapped by the United States Geological Survey (USGS) from surveys and United States Navy aerial photography, 1960-63. Named by the United States Advisory Committee on Antarctic Names (US-ACAN) for James R. Rastorfer, USARP biologist at McMurdo Station in 1967-68 and Palmer Station in 1968-69.

=== Leander Glacier ===
71°56′S 167°41′E. A tributary glacier in the Admiralty Mountains, draining the area west of Mount Black Prince and flowing south between Shadow Bluff and McGregor Range to enter Tucker Glacier. Partially surveyed by the New Zealand Geological Survey Antarctic Expedition (NZGSAE), 1957–58, which also observed upper parts of the glacier from Mount Midnight and Mount Shadow. Named by NZGSAE for the light cruiser HMNZS Leander which served in World War II, 1939-45.

=== Church Glacier ===
71°51′S 167°34′E. Tributary glacier, 10 nautical miles (19 km; 12 mi) long, flowing southward along the west side of Church Ridge to enter Leander Glacier northwest of Shadow Bluff, in the Admiralty Mountains. Mapped by USGS from surveys and United States Navy air photos, 1960-63. Named by US-ACAN for Brooks D. Church, laboratory management technician at McMurdo Station, 1966–67 and 1967-68.

=== Freimanis Glacier ===
72°05′S 168°15′E. Tributary glacier that flows west-northwest for 25 nautical miles (46 km; 29 mi) and enters Tucker Glacier between Mount Greene and Novasio Ridge, in the Admiralty Mountains. Mapped by USGS from surveys and United States Navy air photos, 1960-62. Named by US-ACAN for Harry Freimanis, aurora scientist, station scientific leader at Hallett Station, 1962-63.

=== Man-o-War Glacier ===
72°04′S 168°03′E. A tributary glacier in the Admiralty Mountains that drains the vicinity south of Mount Black Prince and Mount Royalist and flows southward to enter Tucker Glacier between the McGregor Range and Novasio Ridge. Named in association with Admiralty Mountains by the NZGSAE, 1957-58.

=== Massey Glacier ===
71°53′S 168°24′E. A tributary glacier, 6 nautical miles (11 km; 6.9 mi) long, draining the west slopes of Meier Peak in the Admiralty Mountains. It flows west along the south side of Wylie Ridge to join Man-o-War Glacier. Mapped by USGS from surveys and United States Navy air photos, 1960-63. Named by US-ACAN for C. Stanton Massey, meteorologist at South Pole Station, 1968.

=== Deming Glacier ===
72°00′S 168°30′E. Tributary glacier flowing along the north side of Novasio Ridge to enter Man-o-War Glacier, in the Admiralty Mountains. Mapped by USGS from surveys and United States Navy air photos, 1960-63. Named by US-ACAN for Ralph A. Deming, AE1, United States Navy, Squadron VX-6 Aviation Electrician at McMurdo Station, 1967.

=== Fitch Glacier ===
72°01′S 168°07′E. Tributary glacier flowing south along the east side of McGregor Range to enter Man-o-War Glacier in the Admiralty Mountains. Mapped by USGS from surveys and United States Navy air photos, 1960-62. Named by US-ACAN for Lieutenant E.E. Fitch, United States Navy, medical officer at Hallett Station, 1963.

=== Tocci Glacier ===
72°10′S 168°18′E. A steep tributary glacier descending from Mount Lozen to enter the north side of Tucker Glacier, in the Admiralty Mountains. Mapped by USGS from surveys and United States Navy air photos, 1960-64. Named by US-ACAN for Joseph J. Tocci II, United States Navy, aerographer's mate at McMurdo Station, 1967.

=== Helman Glacier ===
72°12′S 168°28′E. A small tributary glacier in the Admiralty Mountains, flowing southward between Mount Gleaton and Taylor Peak into Tucker Glacier. Mapped by USGS from surveys and United States Navy air photos, 1960-64. Named by US-ACAN for Terry N. Helman, United States Navy, radioman at McMurdo Station, 1967.

=== Tyler Glacier ===
72°15′S 168°35′E. Tributary glacier flowing southwest between Taylor Peak and Mount Francis to enter Tucker Glacier. Mapped by USGS from surveys and United States Navy air photos, 1960-62. Named by US-ACAN for Lieutenant Paul E. Tyler, United States Navy, medical officer at Hallett Station, 1962.

=== Staircase Glacier ===
72°16′S 168°43′E. A glacier about 8 nautical miles (15 km; 9.2 mi) long, descending southwest between Mount Francis and Mount Titus into Tucker Glacier, in the Admiralty Mountains. So named by the NZGSAE, 1957–58, for its proximity to the "Staircase" survey station, the latter so designated because a long line of steps were cut in the ice in climbing to it.

=== Kelly Glacier ===
72°19′S 168°55′E. Steep tributary glacier descending southwest from Mount Peacock to enter Tucker Glacier just south of Mount Titus, in the Admiralty Mountains. Mapped by USGS from surveys and United States Navy air photos, 1960-62. Named by US-ACAN for Lieutenant Anthony J. Kelly, United States Navy, medical officer at Hallett Station, 1961.

=== Towles Glacier ===
72°25′S 169°05′E. Glacier descending from the western slopes of Mount Humphrey Lloyd to enter Tucker Glacier northwest of Trigon Bluff. Mapped by USGS from surveys and United States Navy air photos, 1960-62. Named by US-ACAN for Lieutenant William J. Towles, United States Navy, medical officer at Hallett Station, 1960.

== Right Tributaries ==
Tributaries from the right (southwest) include:

=== Cracktrack Glacier ===
71°40′S 166°30′E. A glacier flowing west from central Homerun Range into upper Tucker Glacier in the Admiralty Mountains. The glacier provided an access route to the Field Névé for R.H. Findlay's NZARP geological party during the 1981-82 season. So named because one of the motor toboggan tracks was torn badly here, requiring makeshift field repair.

=== Montecchi Glacier ===
72°04′S 167°35′E. A tributary glacier that drains east from Bertalan Peak to enter Tucker Glacier just north of Mount Hazlett, in the Victory Mountains. Mapped by USGS from surveys and United States Navy air photos, 1960-62. Named by US-ACAN for Pietrantonio Montecchi, geophysicist at McMurdo Station, 1966-67.

=== Pearl Harbor Glacier ===
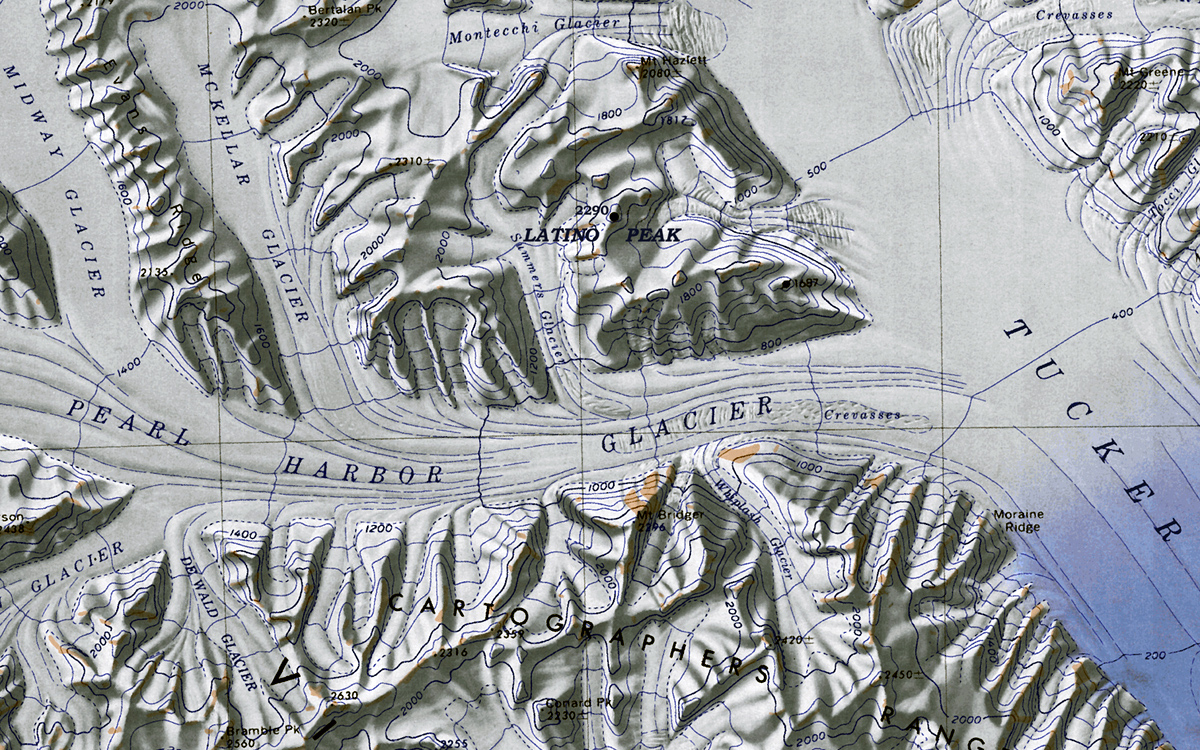
Lower Pearl Harbor Glacier

72°15′S 167°40′E. Major tributary glacier flowing generally east from the Victory Mountains and entering the southwest side of Tucker Glacier 17 nautical miles (31 km; 20 mi) northwest of Bypass Hill. Named by the NZGSAE 1957-58, to commemorate the heroism of the United States forces at Pearl Harbor in 1941.

=== Müller Glacier ===
72°16′S 166°24′E. A tributary glacier, flowing northeast from Millen Range to enter Pearl Harbor Glacier close northwest of Mount Pearson. Mapped by USGS from surveys and United States Navy air photos, 1960-64. Named by US-ACAN for Dietland Muller-Schwarze, USARP biologist at Hallett Station (1964–65), Cape Crozier (1969–70 and 1970–71), and Palmer Archipelago (1971-72). His wife, Christine Muller-Schwarze, joined him as a member of the biology research parties in the last three summer seasons.

=== Lensen Glacier ===
72°18′S 166°48′E. A tributary glacier that flows northeast to enter Pearl Harbor Glacier just east of Mount Pearson, in the Victory Mountains. Named by the New Zealand Federated Mountain Clubs Antarctic Expedition (NZFMCAE), 1962–63, for G.J. Lensen, a member of the NZGSAE, 1957–58, that worked in the Tucker Glacier area.

=== DeWald Glacier ===
72°19′S 167°00′E. A glacier 5 nautical miles (9.3 km; 5.8 mi) long draining the northeast slopes of Bramble Peak in the Victory Mountains. The glacier flows northwest to merge with the terminus of Lensen Glacier where both glaciers join the larger Pearl Harbor Glacier. Mapped by the USGS from surveys and United States Navy air photos, 1960-62. Named by US-ACAN for Lieutenant (j-g-) Bruce F. DeWald, United States Navy, aerographer with the McMurdo Station winter party in 1963 and 1966; forecast duty officer at McMurdo Station during the summer seasons of 1972-73 and 1973-74.

=== Whiplash Glacier ===
72°16′S 167°42′E. A tributary glacier flowing northwest ward from Cartographers Range into the lower part of Pearl Harbor Glacier where the direction becomes east, in the Victory Mountains. Named by the northern party of NZFMCAE, 1962–63, because of its characteristic shape.

=== Midway Glacier ===
72°10′S 166°50′E. A tributary glacier that flows south along the west side of Evans Ridge into Pearl Harbor Glacier, in the Victory Mountains. At the head, it shares a common snow saddle with Jutland Glacier which flows north. Named by the southern party of NZFMCAE, 1962–63, to continue the series of glaciers named after famous naval battles.

=== McKellar Glacier ===
72°12′S 167°07′E. A tributary glacier flowing south along the east side of Evans Ridge into Pearl Harbor Glacier. Named by the northern party of NZFMCAE, 1962–63, for I.C. McKellar, geologist and glaciologist to the NZGSAE, 1957–58, which undertook surveys in the nearby Tucker Glacier area.

=== Summers Glacier ===
72°13′S 167°28′E. A tributary glacier that drains the vicinity west of Latino Peak and flows south to enter Pearl Harbor Glacier, in the Victory Mountains. Mapped by USGS from surveys and United States Navy air photos, 1960-64. Named by US-ACAN for James L. Summers, United States Navy, chief utilitiesman at McMurdo Station, 1967.

=== Trafalgar Glacier ===
72°28′S 168°25′E. A tributary glacier about 30 nautical miles (56 km; 35 mi) long, flowing east in the Victory Mountains to join Tucker Glacier below Bypass Hill. Named by NZGSAE, 1957–58, in association with the Victory Mountains and after the famous British naval victory of 1805.

=== Osuga Glacier ===
72°34′S 166°55′E. A tributary glacier flowing northeast to Trafalgar Glacier just east of Mount Burton, in the Victory Mountains. Mapped by USGS from surveys and United States Navy air photos, 1960-64. Named by US-ACAN for David T. Osuga, biologist at McMurdo Station, 1966-67.

=== Trainer Glacier ===
72°34′S 167°29′E. A glacier 7 nautical miles (13 km; 8.1 mi) west of Rudolph Glacier, flowing northeast to enter Trafalgar Glacier in the Victory Mountains. Mapped by USGS from surveys and United States Navy air photos, 1960-62. Named by US-ACAN for Charles Trainer, meteorologist and senior United States representative at Hallett Station, 1960.

=== Gruendler Glacier ===
72°38′S 167°28′E. A tributary glacier that drains the north slopes of Malta Plateau near Mount Hussey and flows north into Trainer Glacier, in the Victory Mountains. Mapped by USGS from surveys and United States Navy air photos, 1960-64. Named by US-ACAN for James D. Gruendler, member of the USARP glaciological party to Roosevelt Island, 1967-68.

=== Rudolph Glacier ===
72°32′S 167°53′E. A large tributary glacier flowing north between Hackerman Ridge and McElroy Ridge to Trafalgar Glacier, in the Victory Mountains. Mapped by USGS from surveys and United States Navy air photos, 1960-62. Named by US-ACAN after Emanuel David Rudolph, American botanist (1927–92), USARP project leader for lichenology studies at Hallett Station in three summer seasons, 1961–64; Director, Ohio State University's Institute of Polar Studies (now Byrd Polar Research Center), 1969–73; Chairman of the Botany Department, Ohio State University, 1978-87.

=== Stafford Glacier ===
72°30′S 168°15′E. A glacier 5 nautical miles (9.3 km; 5.8 mi) east of Rudolph Glacier, flowing north into Trafalgar Glacier in the Victory Mountains. Mapped by USGS from surveys and United States Navy air photos, 1960-62. Named by US-ACAN for Sergeant Billy D. Stafford, USA, in charge of the enlisted detachment of the helicopter group which supported the USGS Topo North-South survey of the area in 1961-62.

=== Coral Sea Glacier ===
72°33′S 168°27′E. A southern tributary of Trafalgar Glacier, which in turn is a tributary of Tucker Glacier. Named by the NZGSAE, 1957–58, for the Coral Sea naval victory won by the United States and her allies in 1943, and because of the coralline appearance of the glacier due to an extremely broken icefall in its lower part.

=== Wood Glacier ===
72°29′S 166°42′E. A tributary glacier flowing southeast and entering Trafalgar Glacier just east of Mount McDonald. It shares a common saddle with Lensen Glacier which flows northward. Named by the southern party of NZFMCAE, 1962–63, for B.L. Wood, geologist member of NZGSAE, 1957–58, which also worked in this general area.

=== Croll Glacier ===
72°29′S 167°18′E. A tributary glacier flowing southeast along the north side of Handler Ridge into Trafalgar Glacier, in the Victory Mountains. Named by the northern party of NZFMCAE, 1962–63, for W.G. Croll, a member of the survey party attached to this expedition.

=== Hearfield Glacier ===
72°26′S 167°42′E. A tributary glacier which flows east-southeast along the south side of Cartographers Range and enters Trafalgar Glacier just east of Aldridge Peak, in the Victory Mountains. Named by the northern party of NZFMCAE, 1962–63, for B. Hearfield, a leading New Zealand alpinist and a member of NZGSAE, 1957–58, which also worked in the Tucker Glacier area.

=== Coulson Glacier ===
72°25′S 167°58′E. A small tributary glacier flowing south from Cartographers Range into Trafalgar Glacier, 10 nautical miles (19 km; 12 mi) west of Bypass Hill, in the Victory Mountains. Mapped by USGS from surveys and United States Navy air photos 1960 64. Named by US-ACAN for Peter W. Coulston, aviation electronics technician with United States Navy Squadron VX-6 at McMurdo Station, 1967.

=== Elder Glacier ===
72°35′S 168°46′E. Tributary glacier entering the Tucker Glacier just west of Oread Spur, in the Victory Mountains. Mapped by USGS from surveys and United States Navy air photos, 1960-62. Named by US-ACAN for William C. Elder, topographic engineer, a member of the USGS Topo North-South party that surveyed the area, 1961-62.

=== Bowers Glacier ===
72°37′S 169°03′E. Glacier at the west side of Mount Northampton in the Victory Mountains, flowing north into Tucker Glacier. Mapped by USGS from surveys and United States Navy air photos, 1960-62. Named by US-ACAN for Chester H. Bowers, meteorologist, senior United States representative at Hallett Station, 1962.

=== Whitehall Glacier ===
72°43′S 169°25′E. A large glacier flowing north into Tucker Inlet between Daniell Peninsula and the southeast part of the Victory Mountains. Named by NZGSAE, 1957–58, partly because of the literal meaning and partly with reference to the proximity of the glacier to the Admiralty Mountains, the Admiralty office in London being situated in Whitehall.

=== Baker Glacier ===
72°46′S 169°15′E. A small tributary glacier that enters Whitehall Glacier just north of Martin Hill, in the Victory Mountains. Mapped by USGS from surveys and United States Navy air photos, 1960-62. Named by US-ACAN for John R. Baker, biologist at Hallett Station in 1967-68 and 1968-69.

== Other features ==
=== Field Névé ===
71°38′S 167°00′E. A large névé between Homerun Range and Findlay Range in the Admiralty Mountains. The feature lies between the upper reaches of Ebbe Glacier, which flows northwest, and Tucker Glacier, which flows southeast. Named by the NZ-APC after Bradley Field, geologist, NZGS, a member of a NZARP geological party to north Victoria Land, 1981-82.

=== Pemmican Step ===
72°00′S 167°33′E. A step-like rise in the level of Tucker Glacier above its junction with Leander Glacier. It is very crevassed in its southern half, but there is easy traveling over it toward its north end. Named by the NZGSAE, 1957-58. It is the second of the steps on this glacier.

=== Biscuit Step ===
72°22′S 168°30′E. A step-like rise in the level of Tucker Glacier above its junction with Trafalgar Glacier. It is very crevassed in its north half, but there is a good route of easy gradient through it toward its southern end. Biscuits were an important part of the expedition's rations (Australasian colloquialism "tucker"), and a small cache of them was left near the step for the return down the glacier by the NZGSAE, 1957–58, which named the feature.

=== Crater Cirque ===
72°38′S 169°22′E. A cirque on the south wall of Tucker Glacier, immediately west of its junction with Whitehall Glacier. In its floor is an attractive lake containing red and green algae, and in the surrounding rock walls there are nests of Wilson's petrels, skuas, and snow petrels, as well as running streams and growths of moss and lichens. Given this descriptive came by the NZGSAE, 1957-58.

=== Church Ridge ===
71°49′S 167°45′E A southwest-trending ridge, 10 nautical miles (19 km; 12 mi) long, with several peaks over 2,000 metres (6,600 ft) high. The ridge separates the flow of the Church and Leander Glaciers. Mapped by USGS from surveys and U.S. Navy aerial photography, 1960-63. Named by US-ACAN for Cdr. A.E. Church, USN, assistant chief of staff for civil engineering with the U.S. Naval Support Force, Antarctica, 1967 and 1968.

=== Novasio Ridge ===
72°03′S 168°22′E. A long, ice-covered ridge separating the lower portions of Freimanis and Man-o-War Glaciers. Named by US-ACAN for Richard A. Novasio, USN, radioman at Hallett Station, 1957.

=== Handler Ridge ===
72°30′S 167°00′E. A prominent ridge about 10 nautical miles (19 km; 12 mi) long which serves as a divide between Croll Glacier and the upper portion of Trafalgar Glacier. Mapped by USGS from surveys and U.S. Navy air photos, 1960-64. Named by US-ACAN in 1969 for Dr. Philip Handler, then Chairman, National Science Board and President of the National Academy of Sciences.

=== Mount Kyle ===
71°57′S 168°35′E. A mountain 2,900 metres (9,500 ft) midway along the ridge bordering the north side of Deming Glacier. Mapped by USGS from surveys and U.S. Navy air photos, 1960-63. Named by US-ACAN for Ricky L. Kyle, UT2, USN, Utilitiesman at McMurdo Station, 1967.

=== Tucker Inlet ===
72°37′S 169°45′E. An ice-filled inlet identing the coast of Victoria Land between Cape Wheatstone and Cape Daniell. Discovered in February 1841 by Sir James Clark Ross who named this feature for Charles T. Tucker, master of the Erebus.

== Sources ==
- Alberts, Fred G., ed. (1995), Geographic Names of the Antarctic (PDF) (2 ed.), United States Board on Geographic Names This article incorporates public domain material from websites or documents of the United States Board on Geographic Names.
- Cape Adare, USGS: United States Geological Survey
- Cape Hallet, USGS: United States Geological Survey
- Ebbe Glacier, USGS: United States Geological Survey
- Freyberg Mountains, USGS: United States Geological Survey

This article incorporates public domain material from websites or documents of the United States Geological Survey.
