= Mount Francis =

Mountain in Ross Dependency, Antarctica

- Location within Antarctica

Highest point
- Elevation: 2,610 m (8,560 ft)
- Coordinates: 72°13′S 168°45′E

Geography
- Parent range: Admiralty Mountains, Antarctica

Mount Francis (72°13′S 168°45′E) is a massive, ridgelike mountain, 2,610 metres (8,560 ft) high, that overlooks Tucker Glacier from the north, standing between Tyler Glacier and Staircase Glacier in the Admiralty Mountains of Antarctica.

== Exploration and name ==
Mount Francis was mapped by the United States Geological Survey (USGS) from surveys and United States Navy air photos, 1960–62. It was named by the United States Advisory Committee on Antarctic Names (US-ACAN) for Henry S. Francis, Jr., Director of the International Cooperation and Information Program at the Office of Antarctic Programs, National Science Foundation. Francis wintered-over at Little America V Station in 1958 and made visits to Antarctica in other seasons.

== Location ==
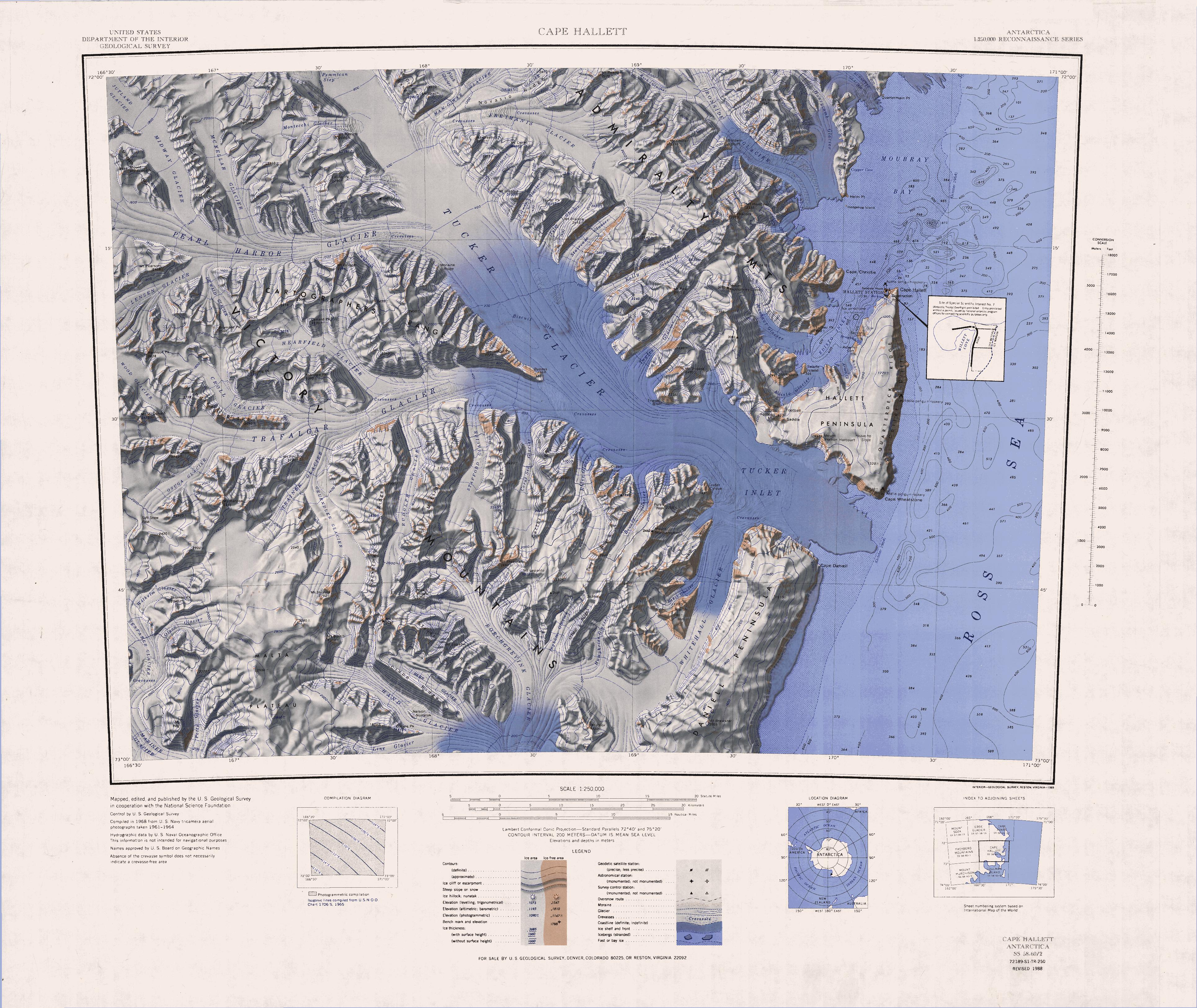
Mount Francis in upper center of map

Mount Francis is in the center of a linear group of mountains and glaciers on the east side of the lower Tucker Glacier. Freimanis Glacier runs west to the north of the group. Features are, from northwest to southeast, Mount Greene, Mount Lozen, Tocci Glacier, Mount Gleaton, Helman Glacier, Taylor Peak, Tyler Glacier, Mount Francis, Staircase Glacier, Mount Titus, Kelly Glacier, Mount Pew, Towles Glacier, Mount Humphrey Lloyd, Mount Trident.

== Features ==
Mountains to the northwest and southeast include

=== Mount Greene ===
72°06′S 168°14′E. A mountain 2,220 metres (7,280 ft) high at the south side of the mouth of Freimanis Glacier at the point the latter joins Tucker Glacier. Mapped by USGS from surveys and United States Navy air photos, 1960-62. Named by US-ACAN for First Lieutenant John H. Greene, United States Army, commander of the helicopter detachment that supported the USGS Topo North-South survey of the area, 1961-62.

=== Mount Lozen ===
72°07′S 168°24′E. A mountain 2,460 metres (8,070 ft) high at the northwest side of the head of Tocci Glacier. Mapped by USGS from surveys and United States Navy air photos, 1960-64. Named by US-ACAN for Michael R. Lozen, United States Navy, radioman at McMurdo Station, 1967.

=== Mount Gleaton ===
72°11′S 168°27′E. A mountain 2,130 metres (6,990 ft) high that overlooks Tucker Glacier from the north, standing near the end of the ridge just north of Helman Glacier. Mapped by USGS from surveys and United States Navy air photos, 1960-62. Named by US-ACAN for Clarence E. Gleaton, Chief Warrant Officer, United States Army, helicopter pilot in support of the USGS Topo North-South survey of this area, 1961-62.

=== Taylor Peak ===
72°12′S 168°39′E. The main peak 2,550 metres (8,370 ft) high of the heights separating Helman and Tyler Glaciers. Mapped by USGS from surveys and United States Navy air photos, 1960-62. Named by US-ACAN for C.B. Taylor, aurora scientist, New Zealand scientific leader at Hallett Station, 1962.

=== Mount Titus ===
72°15′S 169°02′E. A mountain, 2,840 metres (9,320 ft) high, surmounting the heights between the Staircase and Kelly Glaciers. Mapped by USGS from surveys and United States Navy air photos, 1960-62. Named by US-ACAN for Robert W. Titus, meteorologist, station scientific leader at Hallett Station, 1961.

=== Mount Pew ===
72°19′S 169°11′E. A mountain 2,950 metres (9,680 ft) that surmounts the central part of the ridge separating Kelly and Towles Glaciers. Mapped by USGS from surveys and U.S. Navy air photos, 1960-64. Named by US-ACAN for James A. Pew, geophysicist at McMurdo Station, 1966-67.

=== Mount Humphrey Lloyd ===
72°19′S 169°27′E. A conspicuous mountain 2,975 metres (9,760 ft) high which forms a substantial part of the divide between the heads of Towles and Manhaul Glaciers. Discovered in 1841 by Sir James Clark Ross. He named this feature for the Rev. Doctor Humphrey Lloyd of Trinity College, Dublin, an active member of the British Association which promoted interest in magnetic and meteorological research in the Antarctic.

=== Mount Trident ===
72°26′S 169°14′E. A prominent peak 2,480 metres (8,140 ft) high with three closely-spaced summits, rising above Trigon Bluff on the north side of Tucker Glacier. So named by New Zealand Geological Survey Antarctic Expedition (NZGSAE), 1957-58, because of the three summits.

== Sources ==
- Alberts, Fred G., ed. (1995), Geographic Names of the Antarctic (PDF) (2 ed.), United States Board on Geographic Names This article incorporates public domain material from websites or documents of the United States Board on Geographic Names.
- Cape Hallet, USGS: United States Geological Survey

This article incorporates public domain material from websites or documents of the United States Geological Survey.
