= Barker Range =

Mountain range in Victoria Land, Antarctica

- Location within Antarctica

Highest point
- Elevation: 2,400 m (7,900 ft)

Geography
- Continent: Antarctica
- Region(s): Victoria Land, Antarctica
- Range coordinates: 72°32′S 166°10′E

Barker Range (72°32′S 166°10′E) is a mountain range trending northwest–southeast and including Jato Nunatak, Mount Watt, Mount McCarthy, and Mount Burton, located at the southwest side of the Millen Range in the Victory Mountains, Victoria Land, Antarctica. It was named by the New Zealand Antarctic Place-Names Committee (NZ-APC) for James Barker, leader at Scott Base, 1972.

== Location ==
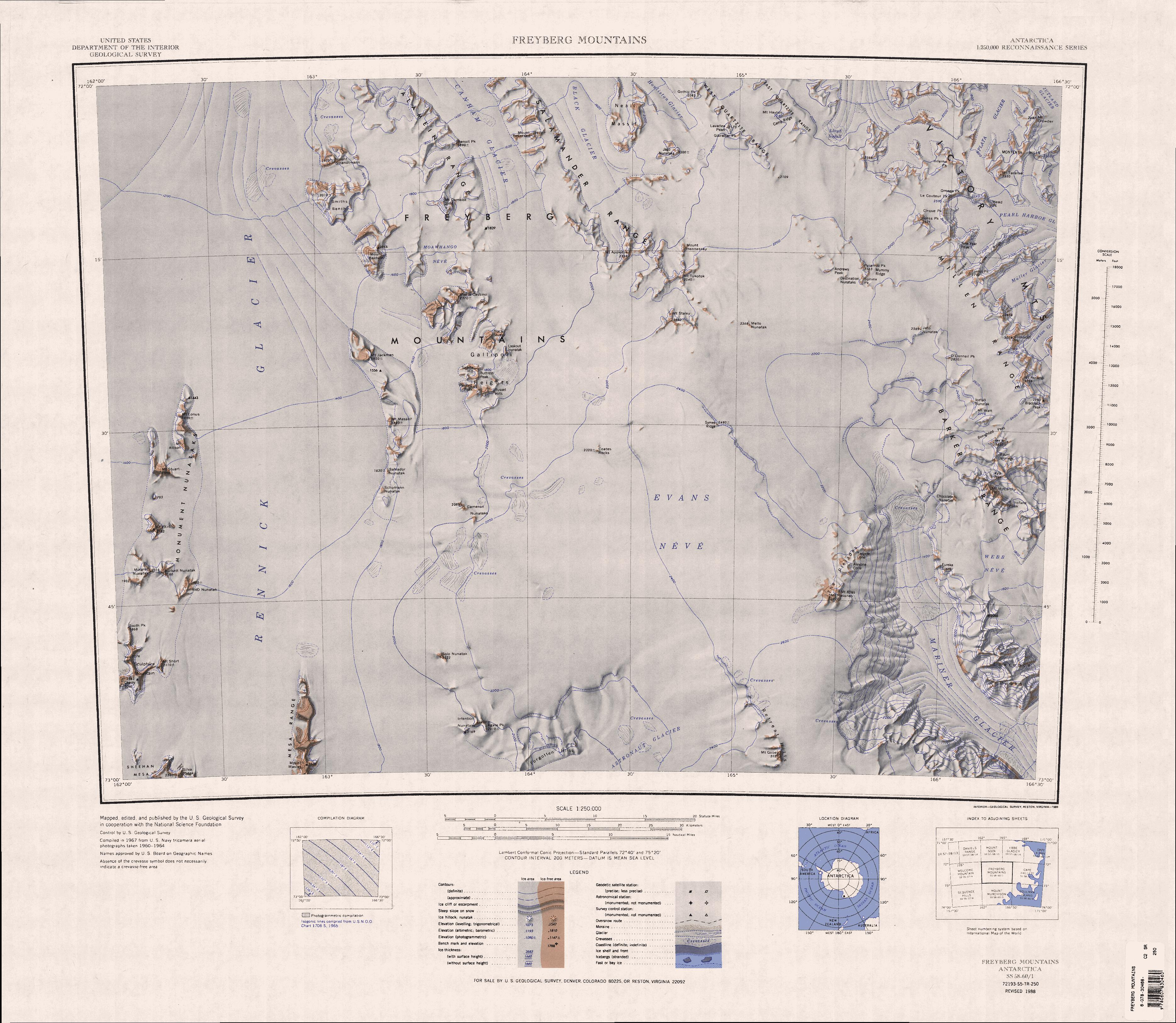
Western Barker Range towards southeast

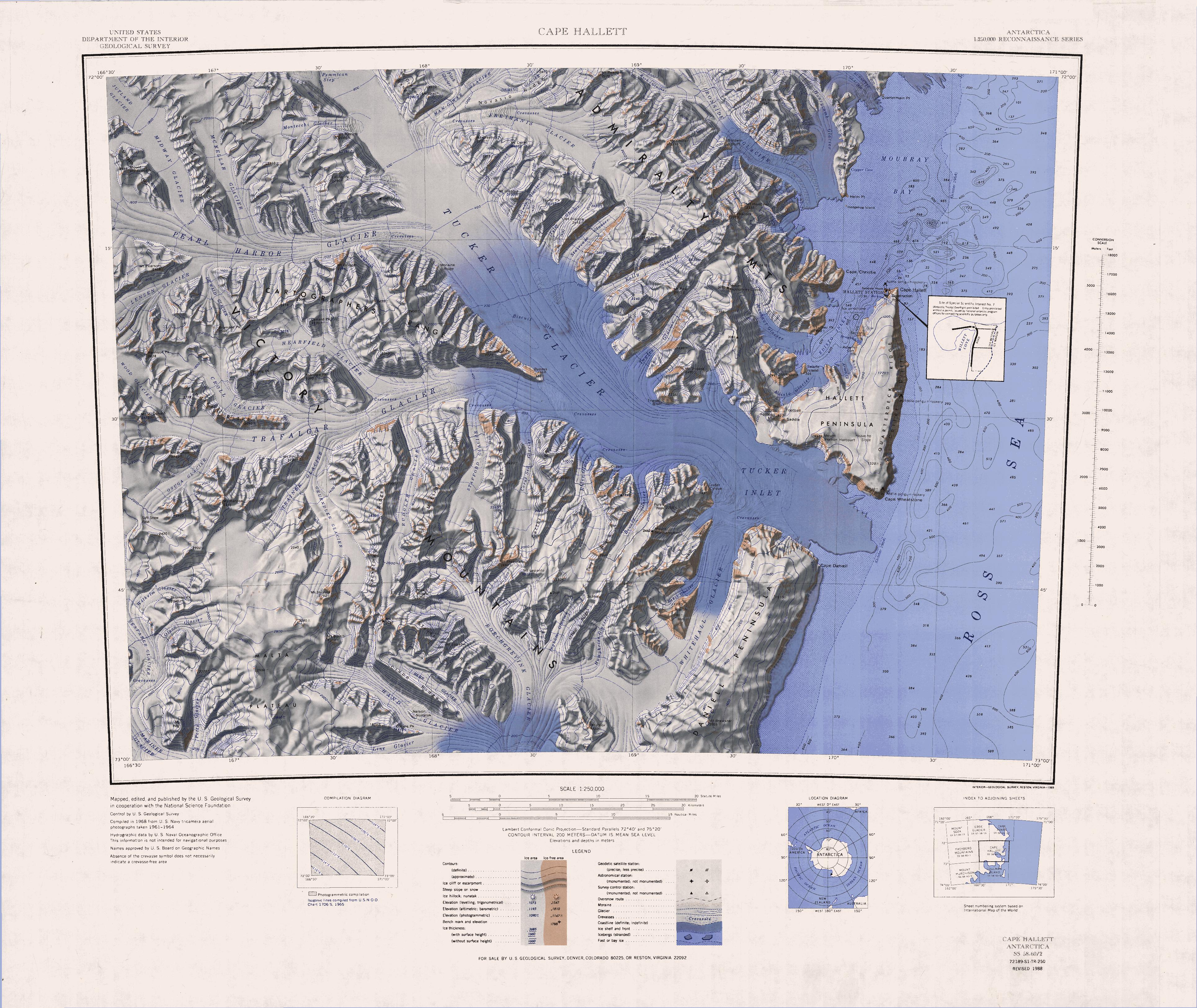
Eastern Barker Range towards southwest

The Barker Range is southeast of the Destination Nunataks. It is to the east of the Evans Névé and the head of the Mariner Glacier. The Webb Névé is to the south of the range. The Miller Range of the Victory Mountains is to the east. At the east of the range, the Wood Glacier flowing from the northwest converges with Osuga Glacier from the southwest to form Trafalgar Glacier.

== Features ==
=== Jato Nunatak ===
72°21′S 165°52′E. A small but distinctive nunatak at the north end of Barker Range. Named by the Southern Party of the New Zealand Federated Mountain Clubs Antarctic Expedition (NZFMCAE), 1962-63, after the JATO bottles used by American aircraft to assist in taking off with heavy loads at high elevations. The aircraft landing point was nearby.

=== O'Donnell Peak ===
72°24′S 166°01′E. A peak on the polar plateau, situated 5 nautical miles (9.3 km; 5.8 mi) west of Joice Icefall of the Millen Range. Mapped by the United States Geological Survey (USGS) from surveys and United States Navy air photos, 1960-64. Named by the United States Advisory Committee on Antarctic Names (US-ACAN) for Frank B. O'Donnell, meteorologist at Hallett Station in 1962.

=== Icefall Nunatak ===
72°28′S 166°08′E. A nunatak 1 nautical mile (1.9 km; 1.2 mi) north of Mount Watt. The nunatak was visited in 1981-82 by Bradley Field, geologist, New Zealand Geological Survey (NZGS), who suggested the name from the impressive icefalls that drop off at either side of the feature.

=== Mount Watt ===
72°28′S 166°09′E. A peak, 2,715 metres (8,907 ft) high, located 3 nautical miles (5.6 km; 3.5 mi) northwest of Mount Roy. Named by the Southern Party of NZFMCAE, 1962-63, after B.H. Watt, expedition secretary.

=== Benighted Pass ===
72°30′S 166°15′E. A snow pass between Mount Watt and Mount Roy. The name was suggested by New Zealand geologist M.G. Laird and derives from the forced lay-over of his field party in an emergency tent due to bad weather on the pass during 1981-82.

=== Mount Roy ===
72°31′S 166°15′E. A mountain rising to 2,850 metres (9,350 ft) high on the south side of Benighted Pass. Mapped by USGS from surveys and United States Navy air photos, 1960-64. Named by US-ACAN after Robert R. Roy, cook at Hallett Station in 1957.

=== Mount Jennings ===
72°32′S 166°15′E. A peak rising to about 2,800 metres (9,200 ft) high immediately south of Mount Roy. Named by the New Zealand Antarctic Place-Names Committee (NZ-APC) after Peter Jennings, field assistant and mechanic with the Victoria University of Wellington Antarctic Expedition (VUWAE) Evans Névé field party, 1971-72.

=== Kyle Peak ===
72°34′S 166°17′E. A peak 2 nautical miles (3.7 km; 2.3 mi) northeast of Mount McCarthy, rising to about 2,850 metres (9,350 ft) high. Named by the NZ-APC after Philip R. Kyle, geologist who worked in the vicinity of this peak, including The Pleiades, with the VUWAE, 1971-72; further geological work in this area with United States ArmyRP during the International Northern Victoria Land Project, 1981-82.

=== Mount McCarthy ===
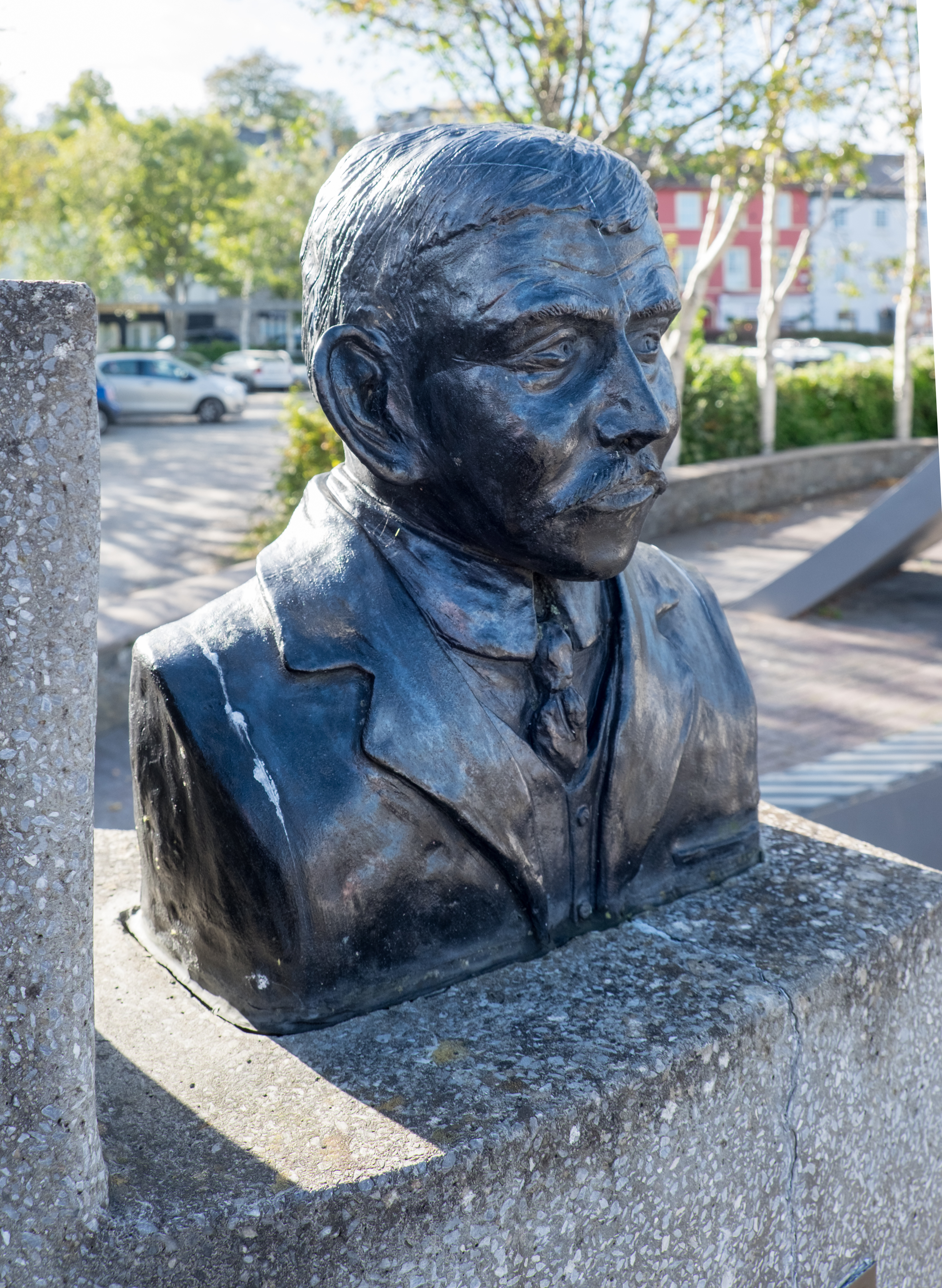
Mortimer McCarthy on the 2000 memorial to Timothy and Mortimer McCarthy by Graham Brett in Kinsale, Ireland

72°35′S 166°14′E. A peak, 2,865 metres (9,400 ft) high, standing 1 nautical mile (1.9 km; 1.2 mi) northwest of Schofield Peak. Named by the NZFMCAE, 1962-63, after Mortimer McCarthy, a member of the crew of the Terra Nova of the BrAE, 1910-13. McCarthy, was a guest of the United States Navy during the 1962-63 season when he revisited McMurdo Sound with two other Scott veterans.

=== Schofield Peak ===
72°36′S 166°18′E. A peak 1 nautical mile (1.9 km; 1.2 mi) southeast of Mount McCarthy. Mapped by USGS from surveys and United States Navy air photos, 1960-64. Named by US-ACAN after Edmund A. Schofield, biologist at Hallett Station, summer 1963-64, and McMurdo Station, 1967-68.

=== Mount McDonald ===
72°30′S 166°36′E. A peak 2,470 metres (8,100 ft) high on the north side of Trafalgar Glacier, 4 nautical miles (7.4 km; 4.6 mi) northwest of Mount Burton. Named by NZFMCAE, 1962-63, for William McDonald, crew member on the Terra Nova during the BrAE, 1910-13. McDonald, who lives in New Zealand, was a guest of the United States Navy during the 1962-63 Antarctic season when he visited the continent again with two others of Scott's veterans.

=== Mount Burton ===
72°33′S 166°44′E. A graywacke peak 2,740 metres (8,990 ft) high standing at the west side of the mouth of Osuga Glacier. Named by the NZFMCAE, 1962-63, after William Burton, crew member on the Terra Nova during the BrAE, 1910-13. Burton, who lived in New Zealand, was a guest of the United States Navy during the 1962-63 Antarctic season when he visited the continent again with two others of Scott's veterans.

== Sources ==
- Alberts, Fred G., ed. (1995), Geographic Names of the Antarctic (PDF) (2 ed.), United States Board on Geographic Names This article incorporates public domain material from websites or documents of the United States Board on Geographic Names.
- Cape Hallet, USGS: United States Geographic Board
- Freyberg Mountains, USGS: United States Geographic Board

This article incorporates public domain material from websites or documents of the United States Geological Survey.
