= Robinson Heights =

Mountain in Antarctica

- Location within Antarctica

Geography
- Continent: Antarctica
- Region(s): Victoria Land, Antarctica
- Range coordinates: 71°22′S 166°40′E

Robinson Heights in Antarctica (71°22′S 166°40′E) are the mainly ice-covered heights 2,170 metres (7,120 ft), elliptical in plan and 15 nautical miles (28 km; 17 mi) long, which rise south of Anare Pass and form the northwest end of the Admiralty Mountains, Antarctica.

== Exploration and naming ==
The Robinson Heights were mapped by the United States Geological Survey (USGS) from surveys and United States Navy photography, 1960–63. They were named by the United States Advisory Committee on Antarctic Names (US-ACAN) for Edwin S. Robinson, a United States Antarctic Research Program (USARP) geophysicist at McMurdo Sound in 1960. He participated in a number of geophysical traverses, including his leadership of the South Pole Station Traverse, 1962–63.

== Location ==
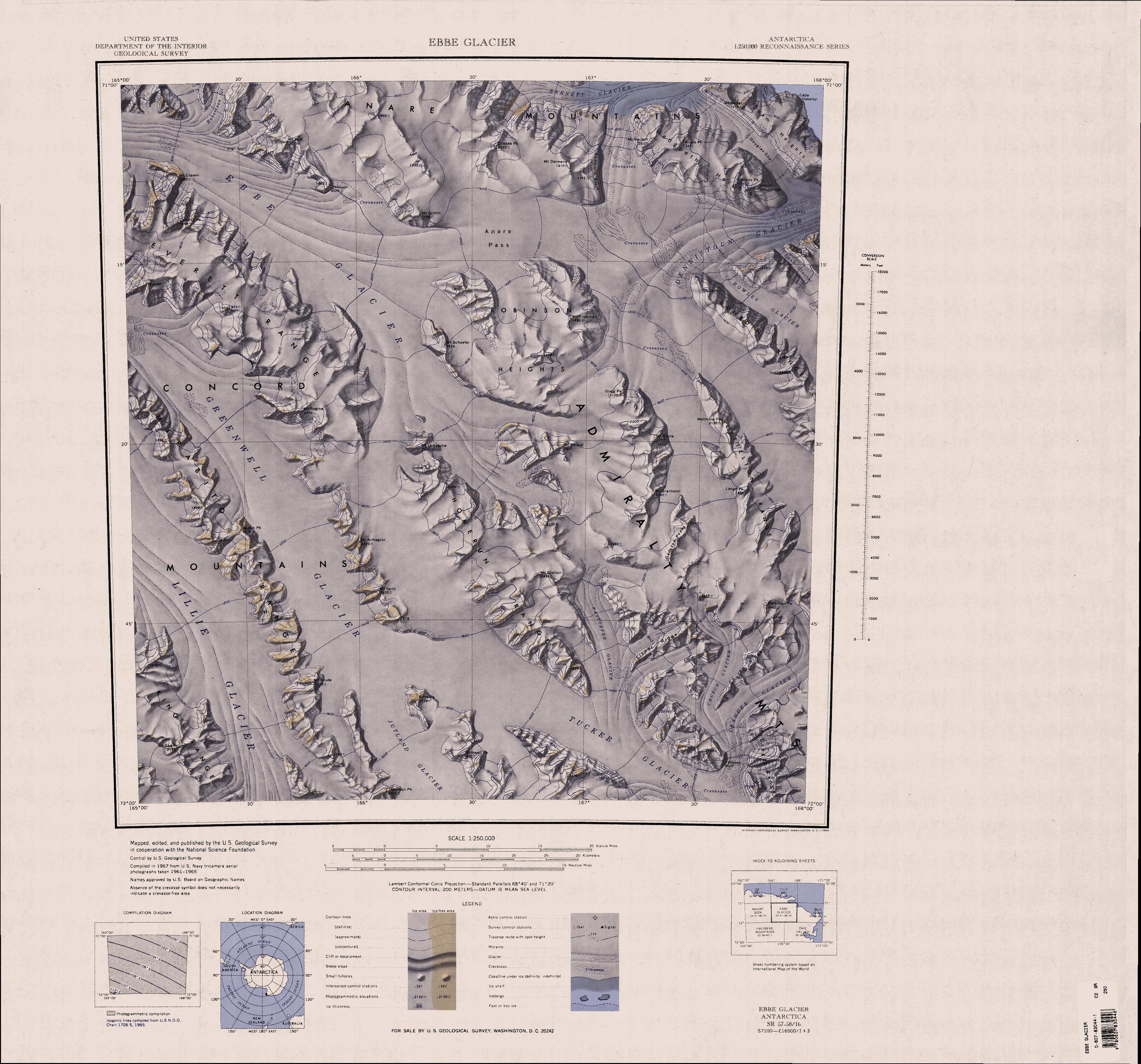
Robinson Heights to north of center of map

The Robinson Heights are in the Admiraly Mountains to the south of the Anare Pass, which lies between the Ebbe Glacier and the Dennistoun Glacier to the south of the Anare Mountains. The Ebbe Glacier flow past its southwest side, separating it from the Homerun Range. The Lyttelton Range is to the southeast and the Dunedin Range to the east. Features of the Robinson Heights include Mount Schaefer and Mount Frishman.

== Features ==
=== Mount Schaefer ===
71°22′S 166°23′E. A mountain 1,825 metres (5,988 ft) high which marks the west extremity of Robinson Heights. Mapped by USGS from surveys and United States Navy photography, 1960-63. Named by US-ACAN for Paul W. Schaefer, United States Antarctic Research Program (USARP) biologist at McMurdo Station, 1966-67.

=== Mount Frishman ===
71°20′S 166°56′E. A small, pointed mountain 1,880 metres (6,170 ft) high in the east part of Robinson Heights. Mapped by USGS from surveys and United States Navy photography, 1960-63. Named by US-ACAN for Steven A. Frishman, USARP biologist at Hallett Station, 1966-67.

== Sources ==
- Alberts, Fred G., ed. (1995), Geographic Names of the Antarctic (PDF) (2 ed.), United States Board on Geographic Names This article incorporates public domain material from websites or documents of the United States Board on Geographic Names.
- Ebbe Glacier, USGS: United States Geographic Board

This article incorporates public domain material from websites or documents of the United States Geological Survey.
