= Findlay Range =

Mountain range in Antarctica

- Location within Antarctica

Geography
- Continent: Antarctica
- Region(s): Victoria Land, Antarctica
- Range coordinates: 71°39′S 167°22′E

The Findlay Range 71°39′S 167°22′E is a range lying parallel to and west of Lyttelton Range, extending between Grigg Peak and Sorensen Peak.

== Exploration and naming ==
The Findlay Range was named by the New Zealand Antarctic Place-Names Committee (NZ-APC) after Robert H. Findlay, geologist, New Zealand Antarctic Division, DSIR; leader of a New Zealand Antarctic Research Programme (NZARP) geological party to this area, 1981-82.

== Location ==
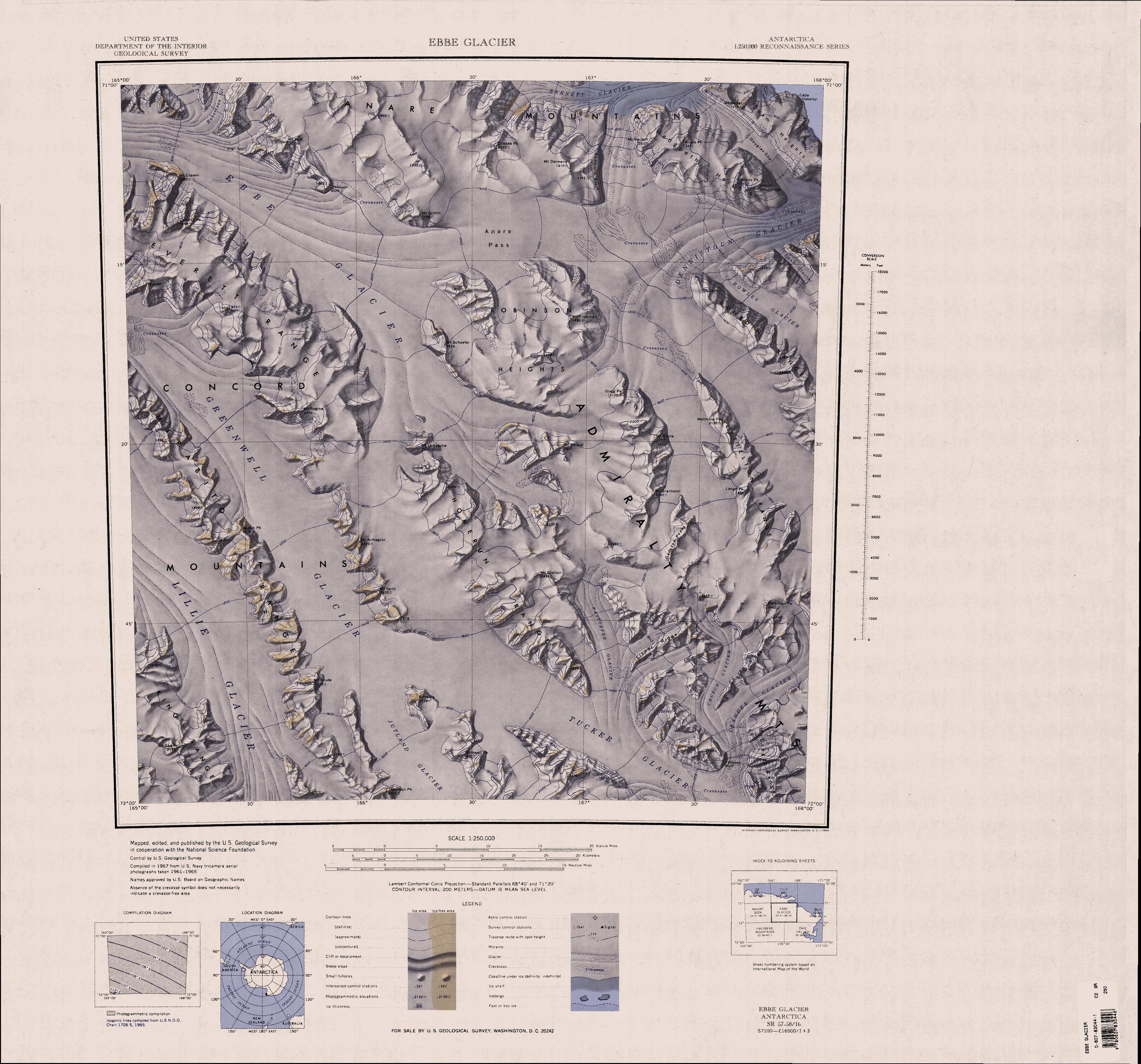
Findlay Range (not marked to north of center of map, southeast from Robinson Heights

The Findlay Range is in the Admiralty Mountains to the southeast of the Robinson Heights. The Lyttelton Range is to the east and the Homerun Range to the west. Features of the Finlay Range include Grigg Peak, Mount Pittard, Mount Granholm and the Gadsden Peaks.

== Features ==
=== Grigg Peak ===
71°26′S 167°09′E. A peak 2,130 metres (6,990 ft) high located 7 nautical miles (13 km; 8.1 mi) west of the north tip of Lyttelton Range. Mapped by USGS from surveys and United States Navy air photos, 1960-63. Named by US-ACAN for Gordon C. Grigg, USARP biologist at McMurdo Station, 1966-67.

=== Mount Bierle ===
71°30′S 167°19′E- A mountain 2,360 metres (7,740 ft) high rising 4.5 nautical miles (8.3 km; 5.2 mi) north of Mount Granholm. Mapped by USGS from surveys and U.S. Navy air photos, 1960-63. Named by US-ACAN for Donald A. Bierle, USARP biologist at McMurdo Station, 1966-67 and 1967-68.

=== Mount Pittard ===
71°31′S 166°54′E. Pointed mountain 2,410 metres (7,910 ft) high standing 12 nautical miles (22 km; 14 mi) east of the north part of Homerun Range. Mapped by USGS from surveys and United States Navy aerial photography, 1960-63. Named by US-ACAN for Donald A. Pittard, USARP biologist at McMurdo Station, 1966-67 and 1967-68.

=== Mount Granholm ===
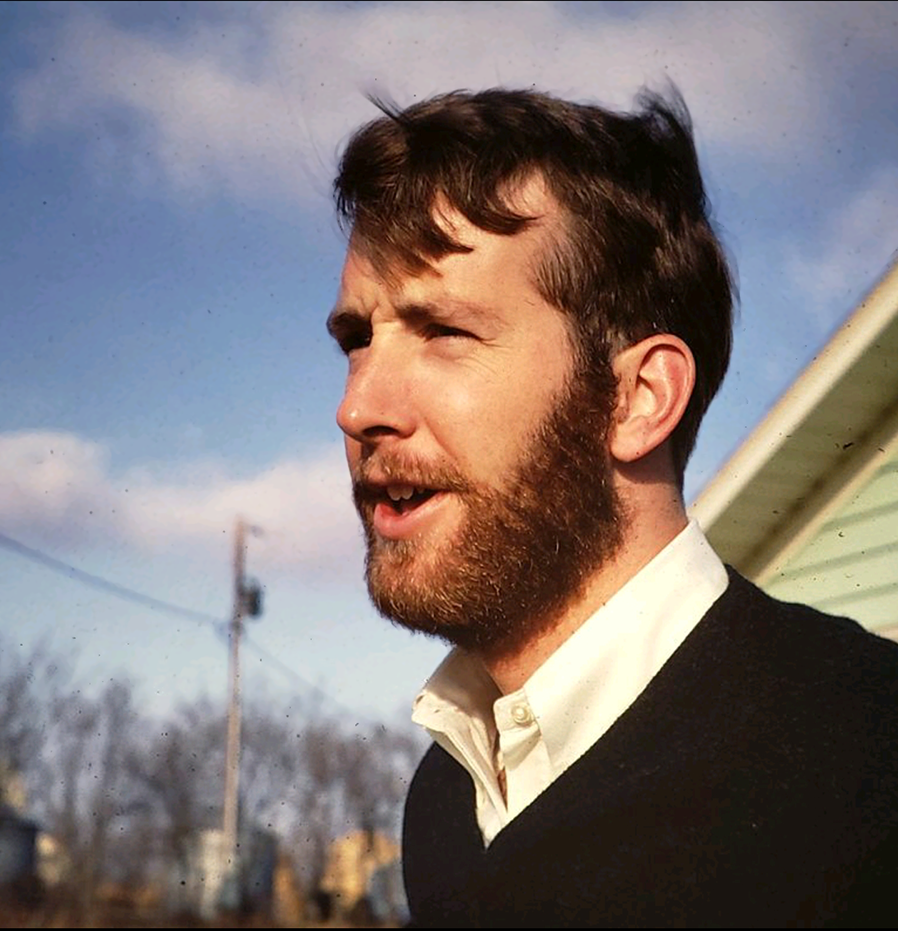
Granholm upon return from Antarctica, 1968

71°34′S 167°18′E. A mountain 2,440 metres (8,010 ft) high 9 nautical miles (17 km; 10 mi) southeast of Mount Pittard. Mapped by USGS from surveys and United States Navy aerial photographs, 1960-63. Named by US-ACAN for Nels H. Granholm, USARP biologist at Hallett Station, 1967-68.

=== Splettstoesser Pass ===
71°38′S 167°15′E. A snow-covered pass at about 2,200 metres (7,200 ft) high, running east–west through Findlay Range to the northwest of Gadsden Peaks. The name was proposed by R.H. Findlay, leader of a NZARP geological party, 1981-82, which used this pass in travel between Field Névé and Atkinson Glacier, a tributary to Dennistoun Glacier. Named after John F. Splettstoesser, geologist, Minnesota Geological Survey, who was field coordinator for USARP projects during the International Northern Victoria Land Project, 1981-82.

=== Gadsden Peaks ===
71°38′S 167°24′E. A line of northeast-trending peaks on a ridge, 5 nautical miles (9.3 km; 5.8 mi) long. They rise over 2,500 metres (8,200 ft) high and stand 5 nautical miles (9.3 km; 5.8 mi) west-southwest of Lange Peak of Lyttelton Range. Mapped by USGS from surveys and United States Navy aerial photographs, 1960-63. Named by US-ACAN for Michael Gadsden, radioscience researcher at McMurdo Station, 1965-66 and 1967-68.

=== Sorensen Peak ===
71°43′S 167°48′E. A peak 2,640 metres (8,660 ft) high which rises between the base of Lyttelton Range and Church Ridge. It surmounts the divide between the Dennistoun and Leander Glaciers. Mapped by USGS from surveys and United States Navy air photos, 1960-63. Named by US-ACAN for Douglas J. Sorensen, field assistant at McMurdo Station, 1965-66.

== Sources ==
- Alberts, Fred G., ed. (1995), Geographic Names of the Antarctic (PDF) (2 ed.), United States Board on Geographic Names This article incorporates public domain material from websites or documents of the United States Board on Geographic Names.
- Ebbe Glacier, USGS: United States Geographic Board

This article incorporates public domain material from websites or documents of the United States Geological Survey.
