= Mount Locke =

Mount Locke may refer to:

- Mount Locke, a minor planet
- Mount Locke (Texas), one of two mountains atop which the McDonald Observatory facilities are located
- Mount Locke (Antarctica), a mountain in the DuBridge Range, Antarctica
