= Homerun Range =

Mountain range in Victoria Land, Antarctica

- Location within Antarctica

Highest point
- Elevation: 1,870 m (6,140 ft)

Geography
- Continent: Antarctica
- Region(s): Victoria Land, Antarctica
- Range coordinates: 71°40′S 166°35′E

The Homerun Range (71°40′S 166°35′E) is a northwest-trending range, 28 nautical miles (52 km; 32 mi) long and 2 to 7 nautical miles (3.7 to 13.0 km; 2.3 to 8.1 mi) wide, east of Everett Range at the heads of the Ebbe Glacier and Tucker Glacier in Victoria Land, Antarctica.

== Exploration and naming ==
The name of the Homerun Range derives from "Homerun Bluff," a field name of the southern party of the New Zealand Federated Mountain Clubs Antarctic Expedition (NZFMCAE), 1962–63, used to denote a turning point in their traverse at this range to the airlift point and return to Scott Base. The entire range was mapped by the United States Geological Survey (USGS) from surveys and United States Navy air photos from 1960 to 1963.

== Location ==
The Homerun Range is in the Admiralty Mountains, southeast of the Everett Range of the Concord Mountains. Robinson Heights and the Findlay Range are to the north and east. The McGregor Range is to the southeast. The Homerun Range runs from northwest to southeast, from Mount LeResche at the head of the Ebbe Glacier, past Mount Shelton to the point where the Rastorfer Glacier flows into the Tucker Glacier. The Elsner Ridge is on the east side of the Rastorfer Glacier. A line of hills between the Homerun Range and the Mirabito Range of the Concord Mountains includes Mount Armagost and Mount Seitz.

== Features ==
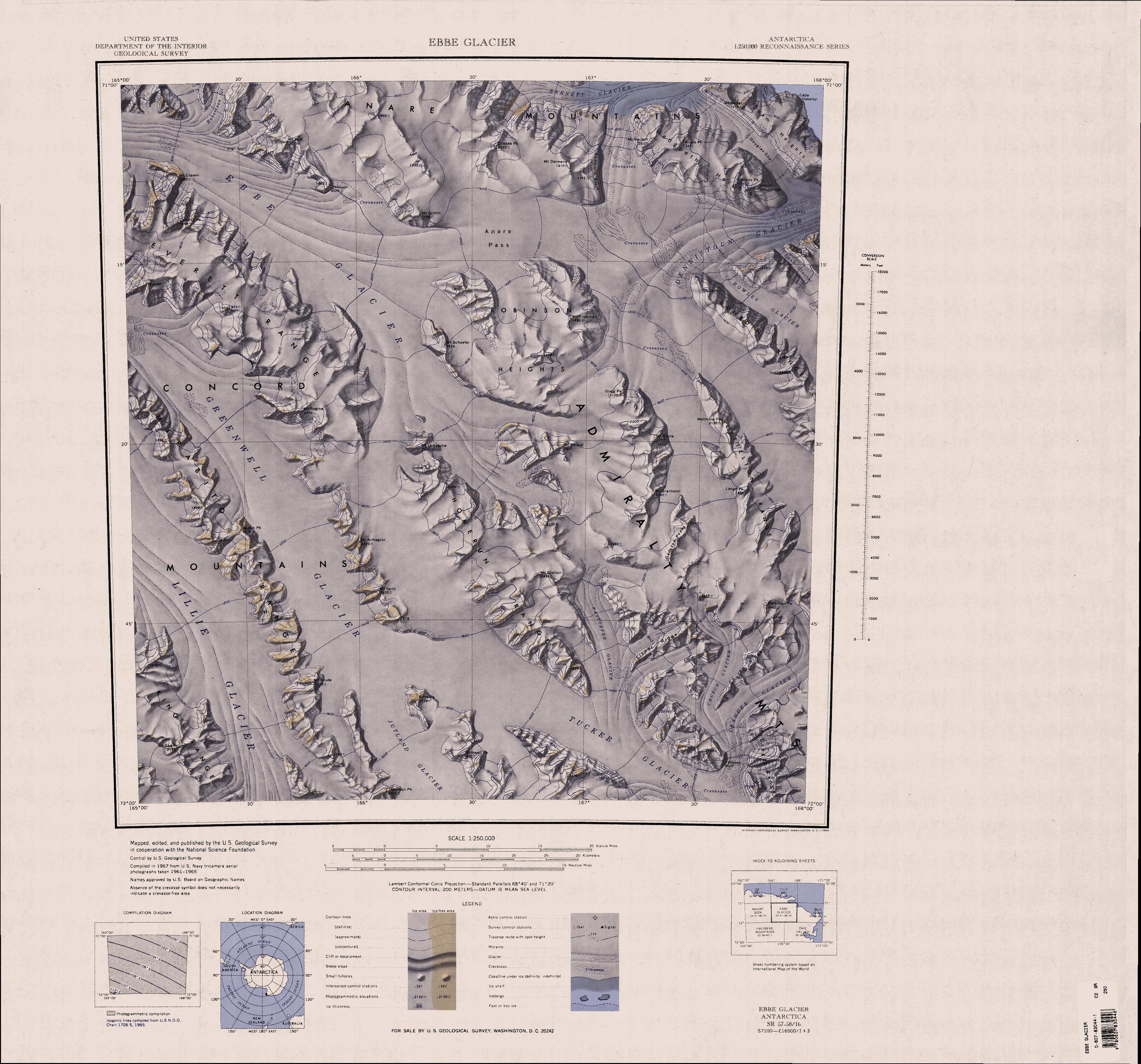
Hedgpeth Heights to north of center of map

Features of the range and nearby features include:

=== Mount LeResche ===
71°31′S 166°17′E. Prominent mountain 2,040 metres (6,690 ft) high at the extreme north end of Homerun Range. Mapped by USGS from surveys and United States Navy aerial photography, 1960-63. Named by the United States Advisory Committee on Antarctic Names (US-ACAN) for Robert E. LeResche, United States ArmyRP biologist at McMurdo Station, 1966–67 and 1967-68.

=== Mount Shelton ===
71°41′S 166°48′E. A mountain 2,485 metres (8,153 ft) high located just west of the upper part of Rastorfer Glacier in the east-central portion of the Homerun Range. Mapped by USGS from surveys and United States Navy air photos, 1960-63. Named by US-ACAN for John E. Shelton USARP meteorologist at Hallett Station, 1964-65.

=== Elsner Ridge ===
71°47′S 167°21′E. A narrow, southwest-trending ridge, or spur, 6 nautical miles (11 km; 6.9 mi) long, located 4 nautical miles (7.4 km; 4.6 mi) northeast of the south end of Homerun Range. Mapped by USGS from surveys and United States Navy, aerial photographs, 1960-63. Named by US-ACAN for Robert W. Elsner, United States ArmyRP biologist at McMurdo Station, 1967–68, 1968–69 and 1969-70.

=== Mount Armagost ===
71°38′S 166°01′E. One in the series of peaks 2,040 metres (6,690 ft) high that rise between Mirabito Range and Homerun Range. This peak stands 9 nautical miles (17 km; 10 mi) southwest of Mount LeResche. Mapped by USGS from surveys and United States Navy air photos, 1960-63. Named by US-ACAN for Chief Equipment Operator Harry M. Armagost, United States Navy, who wintered over at McMurdo Station in 1963 and 1967.

=== Mount Seitz ===
71°43′S 166°05′E. One in the series of peaks 2,130 metres (6,990 ft) high that rise between Mirabito Range and Homerun Range. This peak is 4 nautical miles (7.4 km; 4.6 mi) southeast of Mount Armagost and 9 nautical miles (17 km; 10 mi) northwest of Boss Peak. Mapped by USGS from surveys and United States Navy air photos, 1960-63. Named by US-ACAN for Thomas E. Seitz, Chief Construction Mechanic, United States Navy, of the McMurdo Station party, 1967.

== Sources ==
- Alberts, Fred G., ed. (1995), Geographic Names of the Antarctic (PDF) (2 ed.), United States Board on Geographic Names This article incorporates public domain material from websites or documents of the United States Board on Geographic Names.
- Ebbe Glacier, USGS: United States Geographic Board

This article incorporates public domain material from websites or documents of the United States Geological Survey.
