= Dunedin Range =

Mountain range in Victoria Land, Antarctica

- Location within Antarctica

Geography
- Continent: Antarctica
- Region(s): Victoria Land, Antarctica
- Range coordinates: 71°24′S 167°54′E

The Dunedin Range (71°24′S 167°54′E) is a northwest-trending mountain range, 23 nautical miles (43 km; 26 mi) long and 2 to 4 nautical miles (3.7 to 7.4 km; 2.3 to 4.6 mi) wide. It is located 5 nautical miles (9.3 km; 5.8 mi) east of Lyttelton Range in the Admiralty Mountains of Victoria Land, Antarctica.

== Name ==
The Dunedin Range was mapped by the United States Geological Survey (USGS) from surveys and United States Navy air photos, 1960–63. It was named by United States Advisory Committee on Antarctic Names (US-ACAN) for the city of Dunedin, New Zealand which over the years has had a close association with Antarctic expeditions; also in recognition of the friendship and cooperation of its citizens with American participation in the U.S. Antarctic Research Program.

== Location ==
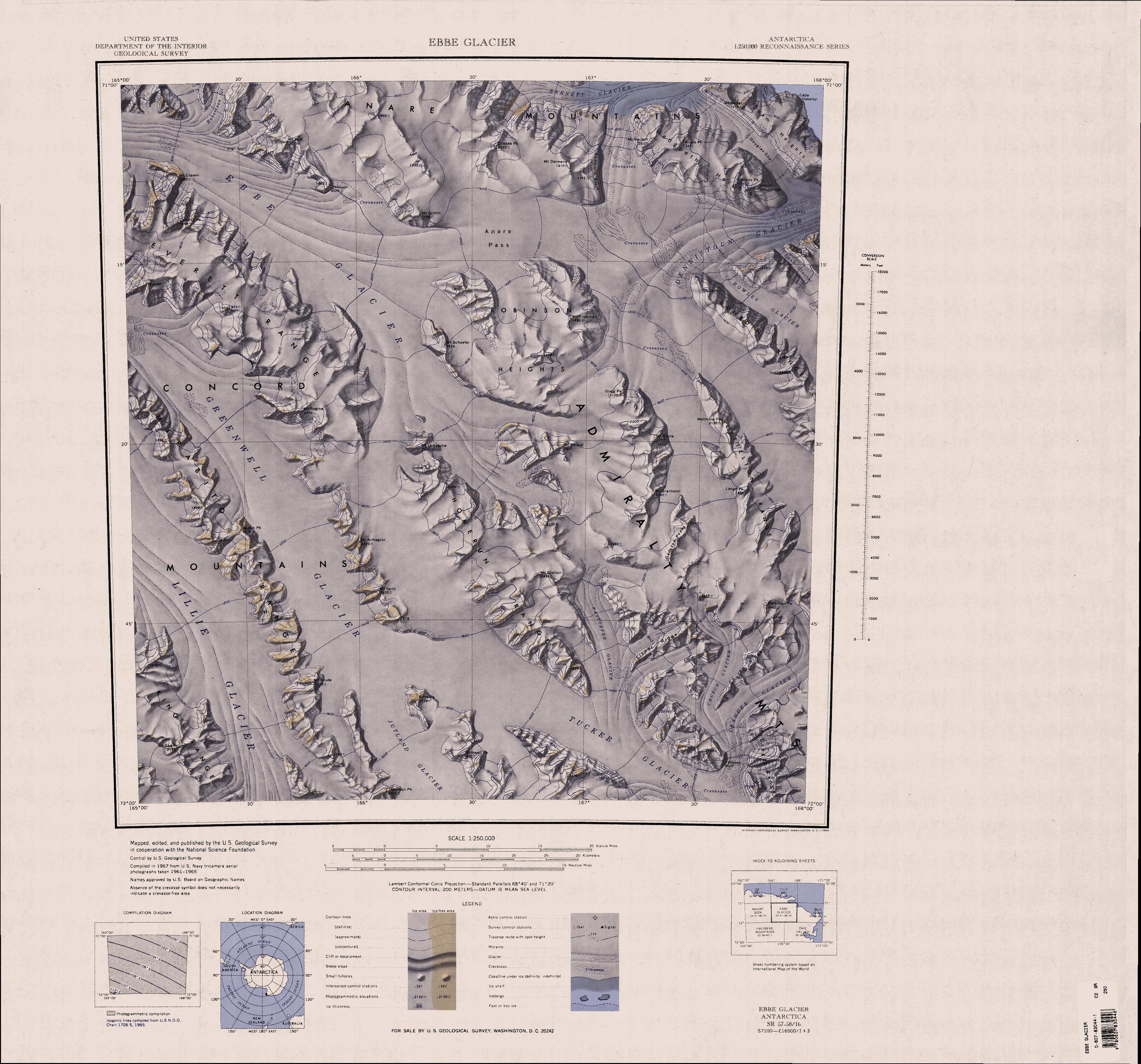
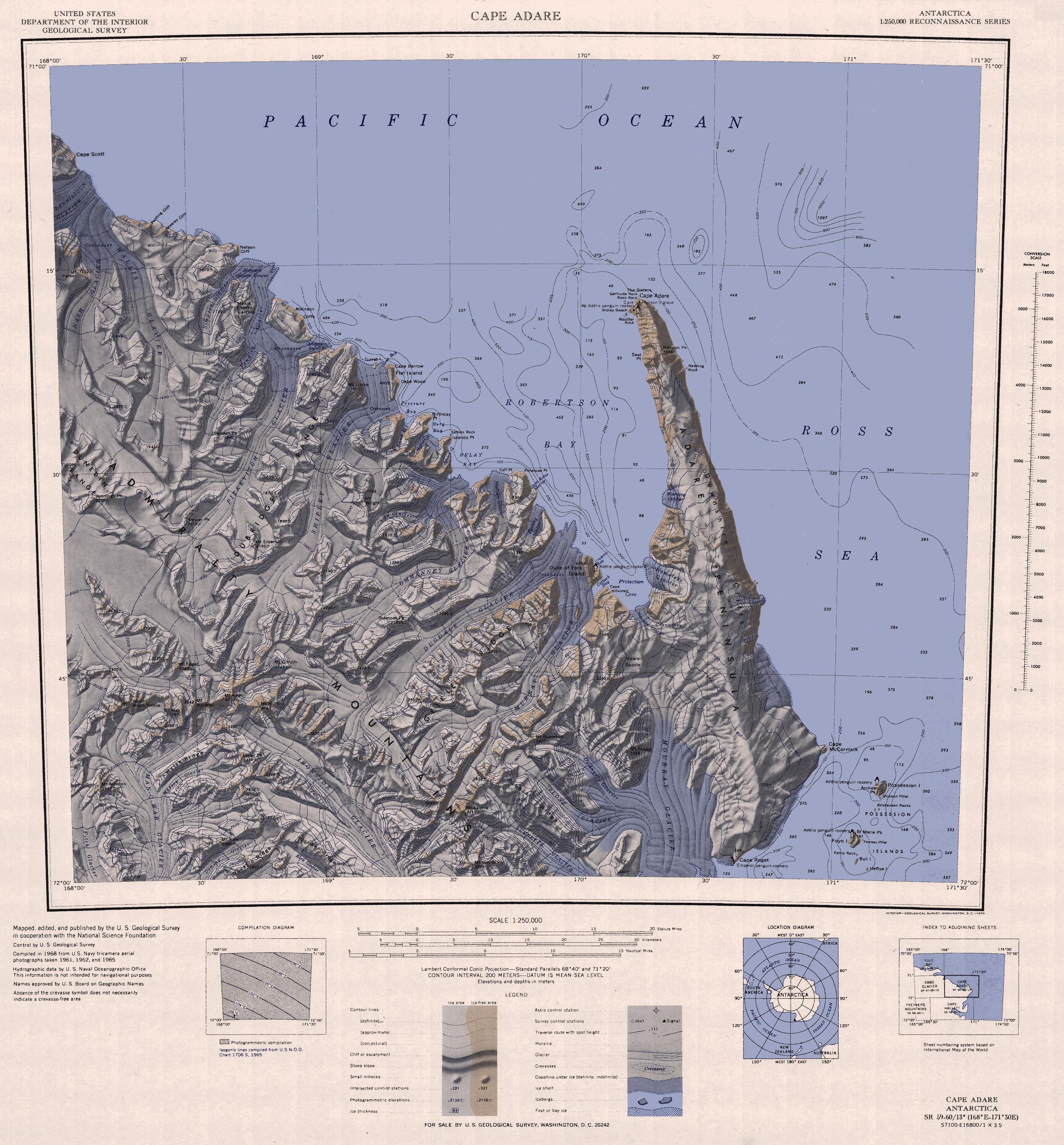
Dunedin Range in northeast of left map, northwest of right map

The Dunedin Range is in the north of the Admiralty Mountains. It extended in the northwest-southeast direction from the Dennystoun Glacier, which flows along the west side, then turns past the northern tip of the range and runs east to the Southern Ocean. The Rowles Glacier flows northwest along the east side of Dunedin Range to enter Dennistoun Glacier. The Lyttelton Range is to the west of the Dennystoun Glacier. The Nash Glacier and Wallis Glacier form to the east of the Dunedin Range. Features include Jennings Peak and Brewer Peak to the southeast of the south end of the range, at the head of Pitkevitch Glacier.

=== Jennings Peak ===
71°32′S 168°07′E. A peak 2,320 metres (7,610 ft) high in the southeast part of Dunedin Range. Mapped by USGS from surveys and United States Navy air photos, 1960-63. Named by US-ACAN for Cedell Jennings, AE2, United States Navy, Aviation Electrician's Mate at McMurdo Station, 1968.

== Sources ==
- Alberts, Fred G., ed. (1995), Geographic Names of the Antarctic (PDF) (2 ed.), United States Board on Geographic Names This article incorporates public domain material from websites or documents of the United States Board on Geographic Names.
- Cape Adare, USGS: United States Geographic Board
- Ebbe Glacier, USGS: United States Geographic Board

This article incorporates public domain material from websites or documents of the United States Geological Survey.
