= Lyttelton Range =

Mountain range in Victoria Land, Antarctica

- Location within Antarctica

Geography
- Continent: Antarctica
- Region(s): Victoria Land, Antarctica
- Range coordinates: 71°33′S 167°45′E

The Lyttelton Range (71°33′S 167°45′E) is a narrow northwest-trending mountain range located south of Dunedin Range in the Admiralty Mountains of Antarctica. The range is 16 nautical miles (30 km; 18 mi) long and forms the western wall of the upper part of the Dennistoun Glacier.

== Exploration and naming ==
The Lyttelton Range was mapped by United States Geological Survey (USGS) from surveys and United States Navy air photos, 1960-63. It was named by the United States Advisory Committee on Antarctic Names (US-ACAN) after the port of Lyttelton, New Zealand, where over the years, many expedition ships refueled and replenished supplies en route to Antarctica; also in recognition of the friendship and cooperation of its citizens with American participation in the U.S. Antarctic Research Program.

== Location ==
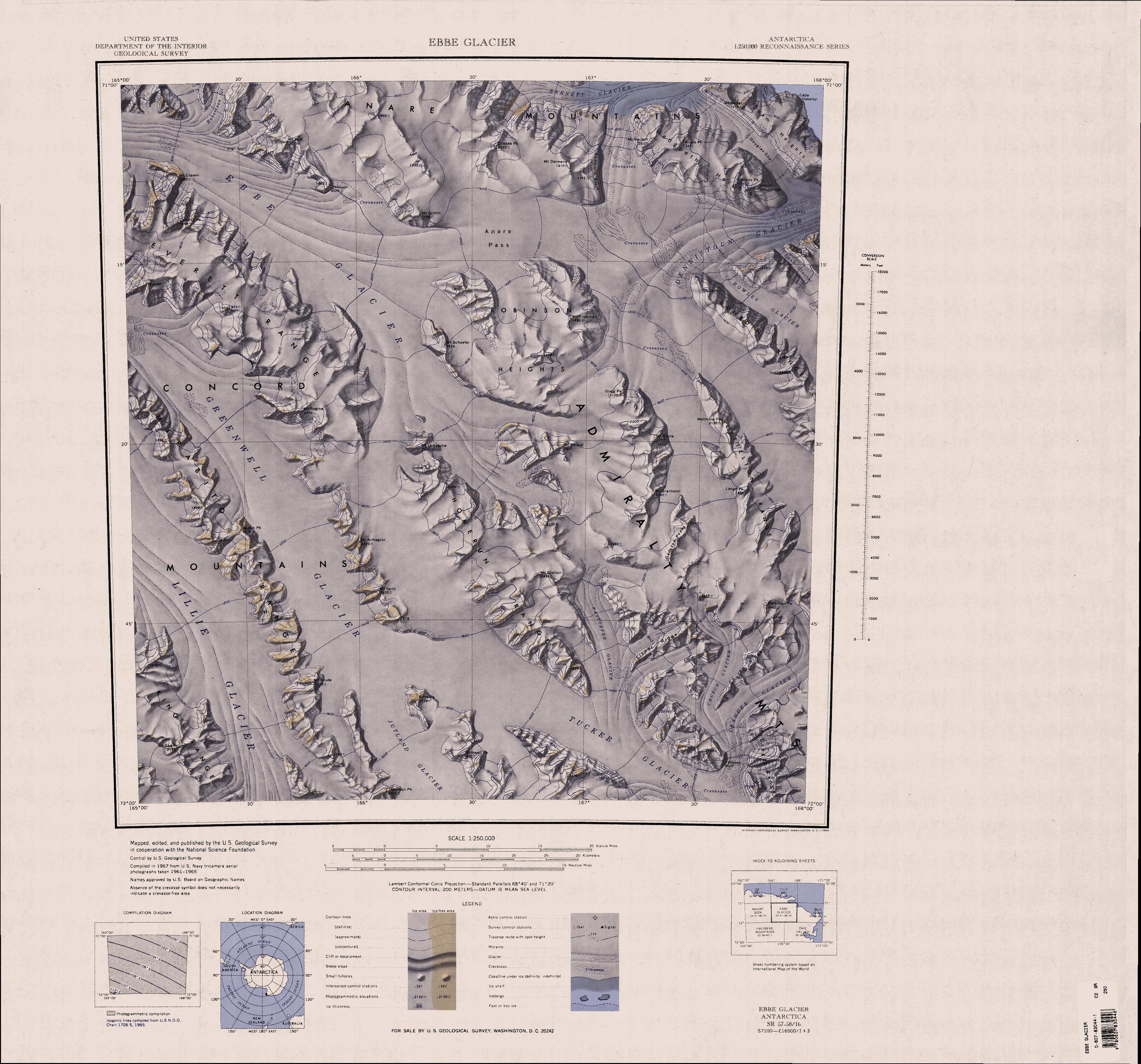
Lyttelton Range to east of center of map

Lyttelton Range lies between Findlay Range, which extends southeast from Robinson Heights, to the west, and the Dunedin Range to the east. The upper Dennistoun Glacier flows past its east side. The Atkinson Glacier flows between Findlay Range and the west side of Lyttelton Range, flowing northward into Dennistoun Glacier.

== Features ==
Features include Wetmore Peak and Lange Peak.

=== Wetmore Peak ===
71°28′S 167°35′E. A peak 2,120 metres (6,960 ft) high in the north part of Lyttelton Range, 6 nautical miles (11 km; 6.9 mi) east-northeast of Mount Bierle. Mapped by USGS from surveys and United States Navy air photos, 1960-63. Named by US-ACAN for Cliff Wetmore, United States Antarctic Research Program (USARP) biologist at Hallett Station, 1963-64.

=== Lange Peak ===
71°34′S 167°42′E. Peak 2,435 metres (7,989 ft) high in the west-central part of Lyttelton Range. Mapped by USGS from surveys and United States Navy air photos, 1960-63. Named by US-ACAN for USARP biologist Otto L. Lange of Hallett Station, 1966-67.

=== Saxby Pass ===
71°36′S 167°45′E. A snow-covered pass through Lyttelton Range south of Lange Peak. The pass was used by a New Zealand Antarctic Research Programme (NZARP) field party led by R.H. Findlay, 1981-82, in travel between Atkinson Glacier and Dennistoun Glacier. Named by New Zealand Antarctic Place-Names Committee (NZ-APC) after Eric Saxby.

== Sources ==
- Alberts, Fred G., ed. (1995), Geographic Names of the Antarctic (PDF) (2 ed.), United States Board on Geographic Names This article incorporates public domain material from websites or documents of the United States Board on Geographic Names.
- Ebbe Glacier, USGS: United States Geographic Board

This article incorporates public domain material from websites or documents of the United States Geological Survey.
