= Admiralty Mountains =

Mountain range in Victoria Land, Antarctica

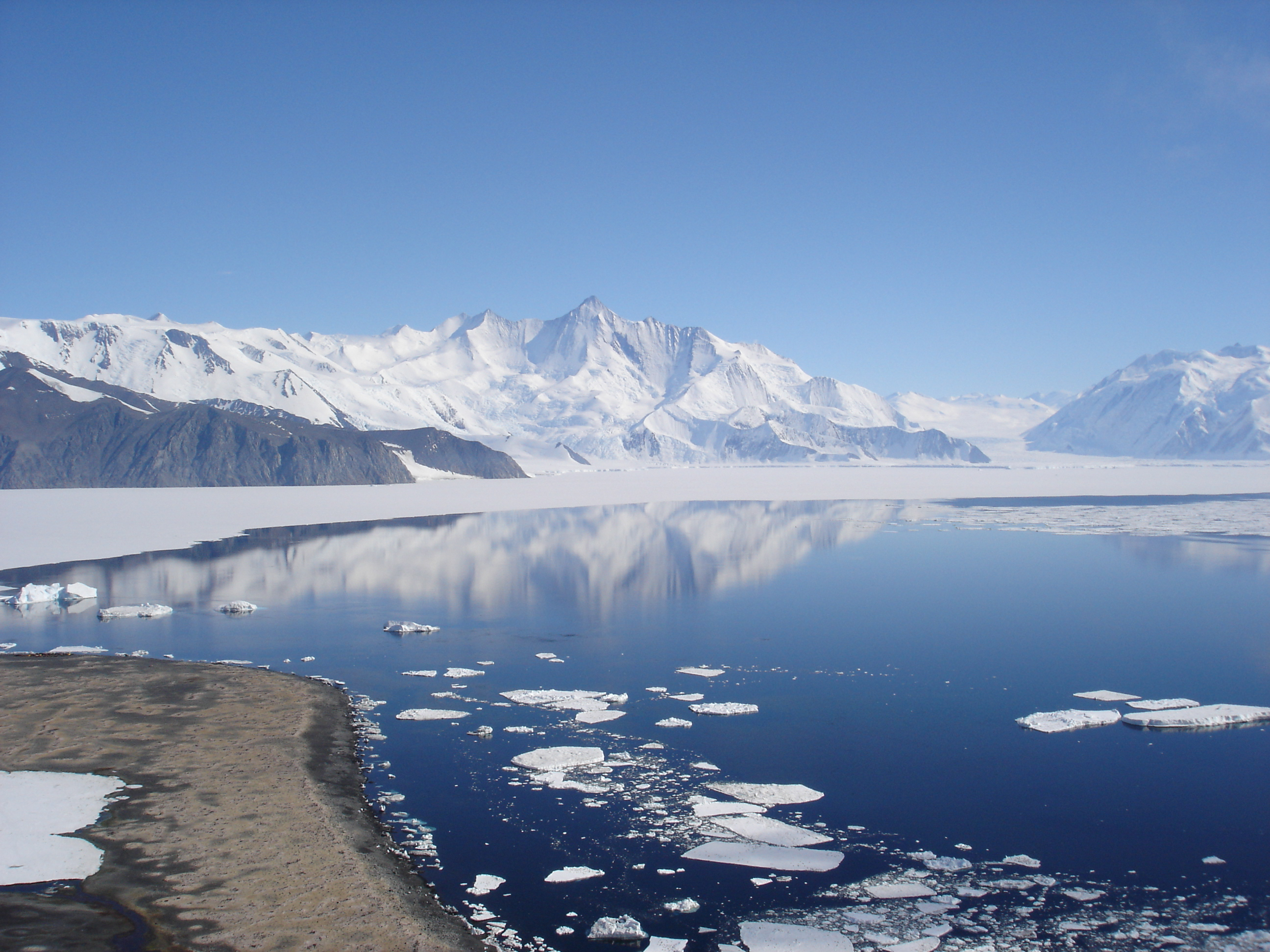
- Mount Herschel (3,335 m) in the Admiralty Mountains as seen from Cape Hallett

Highest point
- Peak: Mount Minto
- Elevation: 4,165 m (13,665 ft)
- Coordinates: 71°47′S 168°45′E

Geography
- Location within Antarctica
- Continent: Antarctica
- Region: Victoria Land
- Range coordinates: 71°45′S 168°30′E
- Parent range: Transantarctic Mountains

The Admiralty Mountains (alternatively Admiralty Range) is a large group of high mountains and individually named ranges and ridges in northeastern Victoria Land, Antarctica. This mountain group is bounded by the sea (Ross Sea and Southern Ocean), and by the Dennistoun Glacier, Ebbe Glacier, and Tucker Glacier.

== Discovery and naming ==
The Admiralty Mountains were discovered in January 1841 by Captain James Clark Ross, Royal Navy, who named them for the Lords Commissioners of the Admiralty under whose orders he served.

== Location ==
The Admiralty Mountains lie to the east of the Concord Mountains and the Victory Mountains, separated from them by the Ebbe Glacier in the north and the Tucker Glacier further south, which flows into the Ross Sea. They are to the south of the Anare Mountains, separated from them by the Anare Pass and the Dennistoun Glacier, which flow east to the Southern Ocean. To their east they are bounded by the Southern Ocean, Robertson Bay, the Adare Peninsula and the Ross Sea.

The Dennistoun Glacier which flows past the northeastern section of the Admiralty Mountains, separates then from the Quam Heights and Hedgpeth Heights in the Anare Mountains to the north. The Robinson Heights in the northwest Admiralty Mountains are separated from the Anare Mountains to the north by the Anare Pass. They are east of the Everett Range in the Concord Mountains. The Homerun Range in the Admiralty Mountains is east of the Mirabito Range in the Concord Mountains. Further south, the Admiralty Mountains face the Cartographers Range in the Victory Mountains across the Tucker Glacier.

The southern tip of the mountains joins to the Hallett Peninsula to the north of Tucker Inlet on the Ross Sea. Moubray Bay is to the north of the Hallett Peninsula, and receives several glaciers that drain the southeast of the range. The Adare Peninsula extends along the coast to the north of Moubray Bay and encloses Robertson Bay, which receives several glaciers that drain the central part of the mountains. To the north of this bay, glaciers drain the northeast of the mountains directly into the Southern Ocean.

== Mountains and peaks ==
This range includes the following mountains and peaks, among many others:

| Mountain/Peak | metres | feet | coordinates |
|---|---|---|---|
| Mount Minto | 4,165 | 13,665 | 71°47′S 168°45′E |
| Mount Adam | 4,010 | 13,156 | 71°47′S 168°37′E |
| Mount Ajax | 3,770 | 12,369 | 71°48′S 168°27′E |
| Mount Sabine | 3,720 | 12,205 | 71°55′S 169°33′E |
| Mount Royalist | 3,640 | 11,942 | 71°47′S 168°30′E |
| Mount Bevin | 3,490 | 11,450 | 71°54′S 169°27′E |
| Mount Black Prince | 3,405 | 11,171 | 71°47′S 168°15′E |
| Mount Peacock | 3,210 | 10,531 | 72°13′S 169°27′E |
| Mount Gilruth | 3,160 | 10,367 | 71°44′S 168°48′E |
| Mount Achilles | 2,880 | 9,449 | 71°53′S 168°08′E |

== Glaciers ==
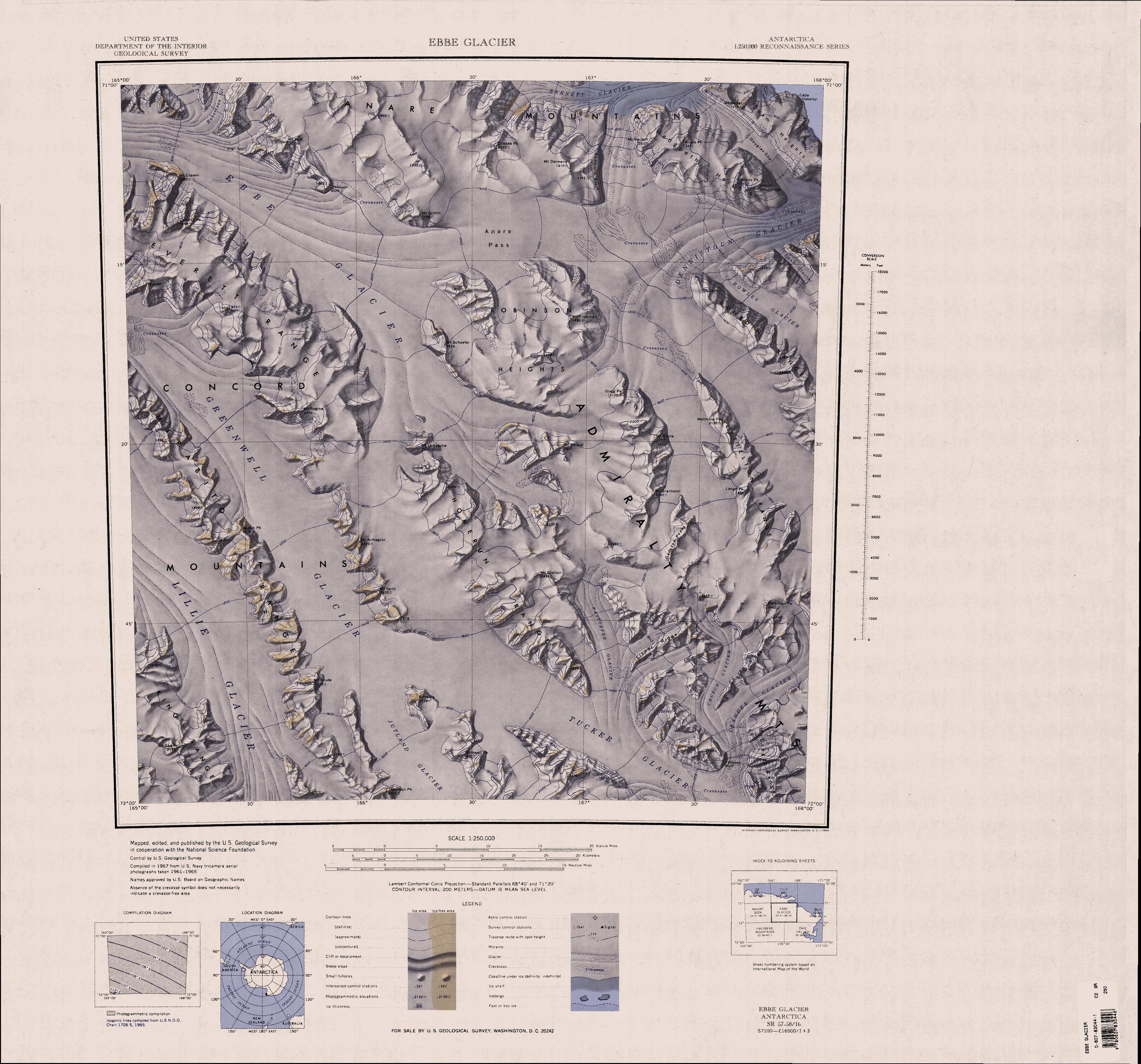
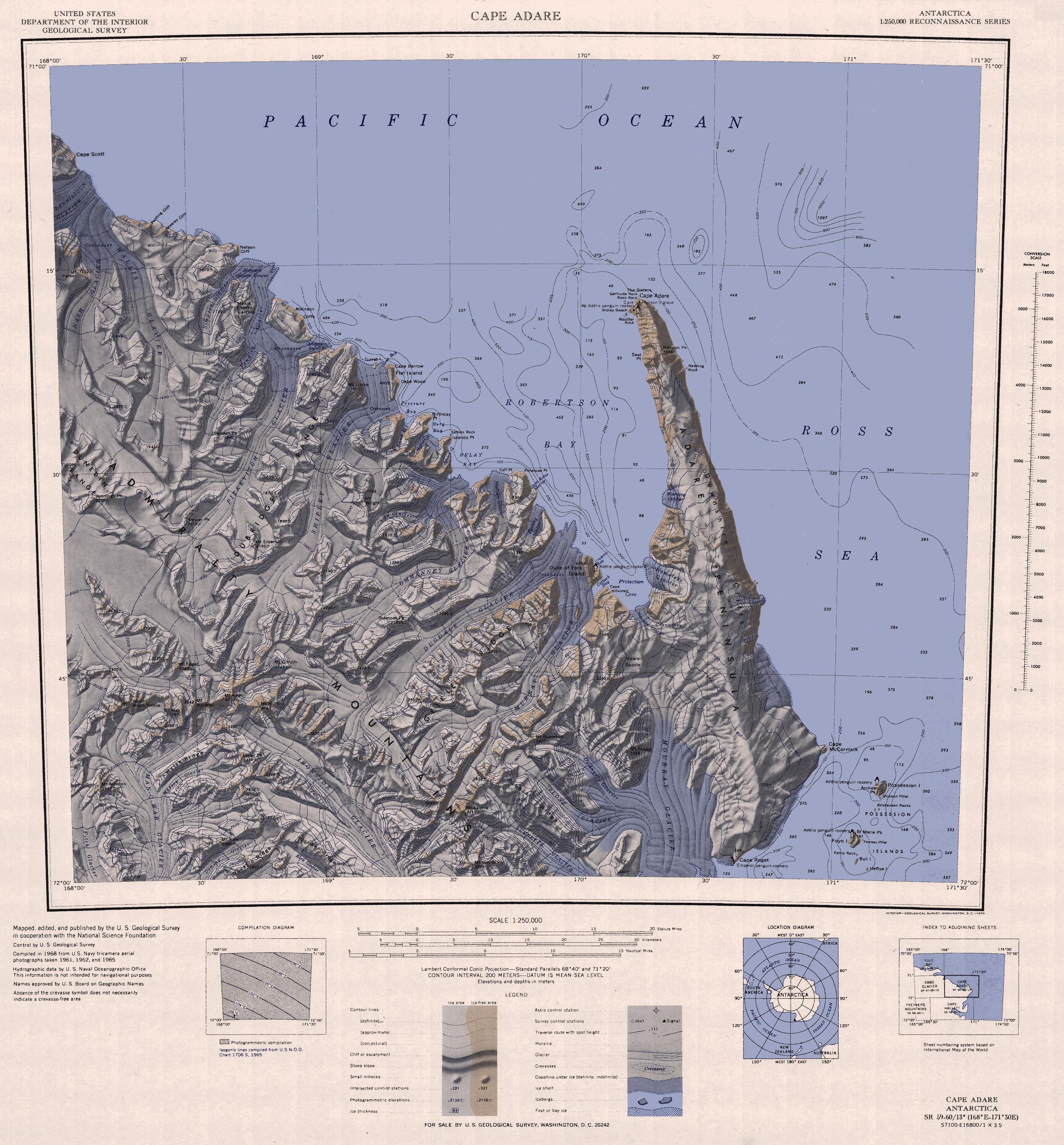
Northern part of the Admiralty Mountains

The main glaciers bounding the mountains are the Dennistoun Glacier to the northeast, which flows east to the Southern Ocean, Ebbe Glacier to the northwest, a tributary of the Lillie Glacier, which flows west and then north to Ob' Bay, and the large Tucker Glacier along the western edge, which flows southeast to the Ross Sea.

- Dennistoun Glacier (71°11′S 168°0′E), a glacier, 50 nautical miles (93 km; 58 mi) long, draining the northern slopes of Mount Black Prince, Mount Royalist and Mount Adam in the Admiralty Mountains. It flows northwest between the Lyttelton Range and Dunedin Range, turning east on rounding the latter range to enter the sea south of Cape Scott.
- Ebbe Glacier (71°03′S 164°45′E), a tributary glacier about 60 nautical miles (110 km; 69 mi) long, draining northwest from the Homerun Range and Robinson Heights, and then west-northwest between Everett Range and Anare Mountains into Lillie Glacier. This feature saddles with Tucker Glacier, the latter draining southeast to the Ross Sea.
- Tucker Glacier (72°32′S 169°15′E), a major valley glacier of Victoria Land, Antarctica, about 90 nautical miles (170 km; 100 mi) long, flowing southeast between the Admiralty Mountains and the Victory Mountains to the Ross Sea. There is a snow saddle at the glacier's head, just west of Homerun Range, from which the Ebbe Glacier flows northwestward.

A number of smaller glaciers drain the east of the mountains to the sea, including (from north to south) Simpson Glacier, Pitkevitch Glacier, Shipley Glacier, Ommanney Glacier, Dugdale Glacier, Murray Glacier, Moubray Glacier, Burnette Glacier and Ironside Glacier.

== Mountain groups ==
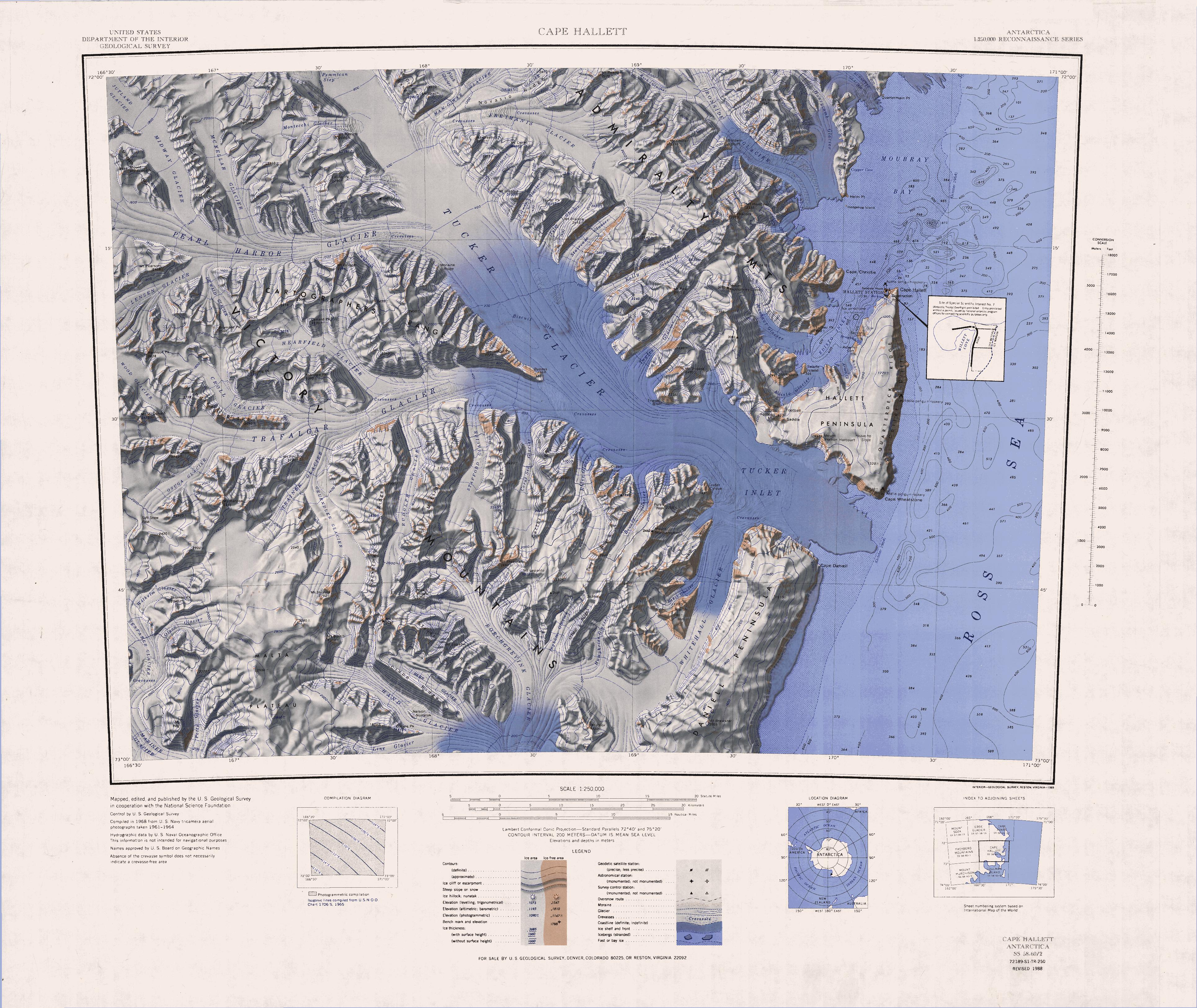
Southern part of the Admiralty Mountains in center north of the map

Formally named mountain groups include:

- Homerun Range (71°40′S 166°35′E), a northwest-trending range, 28 nautical miles (52 km; 32 mi) long and 2 to 7 nautical miles (3.7 to 13.0 km; 2.3 to 8.1 mi) wide, east of Everett Range at the heads of the Ebbe Glacier and Tucker Glacier.
- Robinson Heights (71°22′S 166°40′E) are the mainly ice-covered heights 2,170 metres (7,120 ft), elliptical in plan and 15 nautical miles (28 km; 17 mi) long, which rise south of Anare Pass and form the northwest end of the Admiralty Mountains.
- Findlay Range 71°39′S 167°22′E, a range lying parallel to and west of Lyttelton Range, extending between Grigg Peak and Sorensen Peak.
- Lyttelton Range (71°33′S 167°45′E), a narrow northwest-trending mountain range located south of Dunedin Range. The range is 16 nautical miles (30 km; 18 mi) long and forms the western wall of the upper part of the Dennistoun Glacier.
- Dunedin Range (71°24′S 167°54′E), a northwest-trending mountain range, 23 nautical miles (43 km; 26 mi) long and 2 to 4 nautical miles (3.7 to 7.4 km; 2.3 to 4.6 mi) wide. It is located 5 nautical miles (9.3 km; 5.8 mi) east of Lyttelton Range.
- McGregor Range (71°58′S 167°51′E), a mountain range 13 nautical miles (24 km; 15 mi) long in the south-central Admiralty Mountains. The range is circumscribed by the flow of the Tucker Glacier, Leander Glacier, Fitch Glacier and Man-o-War Glacier.

Mountains that are in the center of an unnamed mountain group include:

- Mount Minto (71°47′S 168°45′E), a lofty, mostly ice-free mountain rising to 4,165 metres (13,665 ft), located 2.5 nautical miles (4.6 km; 2.9 mi) east of Mount Adam in the central portion of the Admiralty Mountains.
- Mount Francis (72°13′S 168°45′E), a massive, ridgelike mountain, 2,610 metres (8,560 ft) high, that overlooks Tucker Glacier from the north, standing between Tyler Glacier and Staircase Glacier.
- Mount Chider (72°6′S 169°10′E), a notable mountain, 3,110 metres (10,200 ft) high, standing 2 nautical miles (3.7 km; 2.3 mi) southeast of Mount Hart.
- Slagle Ridge (71°55′S 169°50′E), a high and massive snow-covered ridge between Slone Glacier and Burnette Glacier.

== Sources ==
- Alberts, Fred G., ed. (1995), Geographic Names of the Antarctic (PDF) (2 ed.), United States Board on Geographic Names This article incorporates public domain material from websites or documents of the United States Board on Geographic Names.
- Cape Adare, USGS: United States Geographic Board
- Cape Hallet, USGS: United States Geological Survey
- Ebbe Glacier, USGS: United States Geographic Board

This article incorporates public domain material from websites or documents of the United States Geological Survey.
