= Mount Chider =

Mountain in Ross Dependency, Antarctica

- Location within Antarctica

Highest point
- Elevation: 3,110 m (10,200 ft)
- Coordinates: 72°6′S 169°10′E

Geography
- Location: Borchgrevink Coast, Victoria Land, Antarctica
- Parent range: Admiralty Mountains

Mount Chider (72°6′S 169°10′E) is a notable mountain, 3,110 metres (10,200 ft) high, standing 2 nautical miles (3.7 km; 2.3 mi) southeast of Mount Hart in the Admiralty Mountains, Victoria Land, Antarctica.

== Exploration and name ==
Mount Chider was mapped by the United States Geological Survey (USGS) from surveys and from United States Navy air photos, 1960–64. It was named by the United States Advisory Committee on Antarctic Names (US-ACAN) for Lieutenant Commander Thomas J. Chider, helicopter pilot with U.S. Navy Squadron VX-6 at McMurdo Station in Operation Deep Freeze 1968.

== Location ==
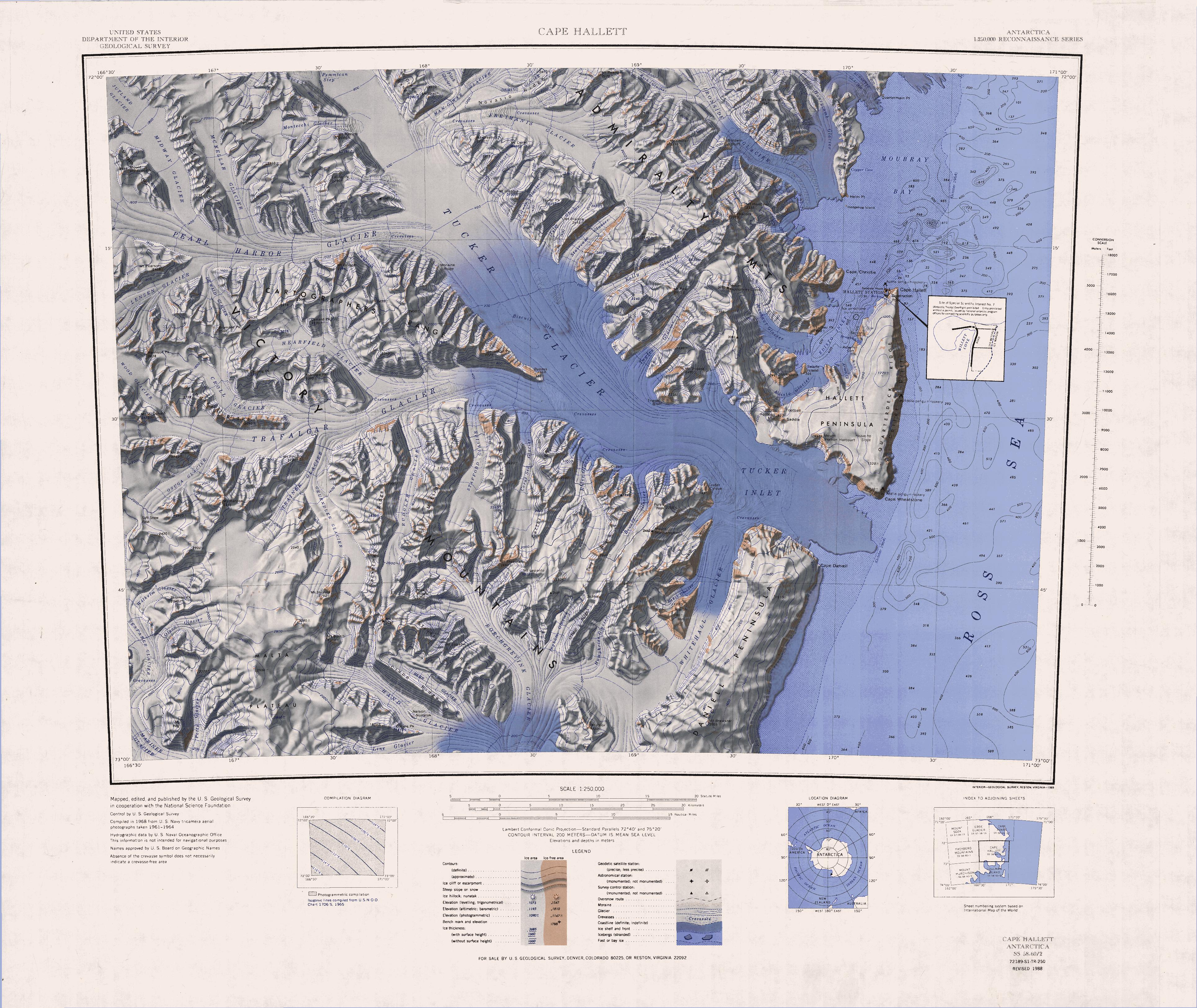
Mount Chider in upper east of map

Mount Chider lies on the line of mountains between the Freimanis Glacier to the southwest and the Kirk Glacier and Ironside Glacier to the northeast. Peaks in this group include, from north to south, Mount Pearigen, Mount Hart, Mount Chider, Mount Herschel and Mount Peacock.

== Features ==
=== Mount Pearigen ===
72°01′S 168°50′E. A prominent mountain 3,020 metres (9,910 ft) high standing 6 nautical miles (11 km; 6.9 mi) northwest of Mount Hart. Mapped by USGS from surveys and United States Navy air photos, 1960-64. Named by US-ACAN for Lieutenant Commander Jare M. Pearigen, United States Navy, helicopter pilot in Operation Deep Freeze 1968, 1969 and 1970.

=== Mount Hart ===
72°05′S 169°05′E. A mountain over 3,000 metres (9,800 ft) high, standing 2 nautical miles (3.7 km; 2.3 mi) northwest of Mount Chider. Mapped by USGS from surveys and United States Navy air photos, 1960-64. Named by US-ACAN for Lieutenant Vemon D. Hart, officer in charge of the United States Navy Squadron VX-6 winter party at McMurdo Station, 1968.

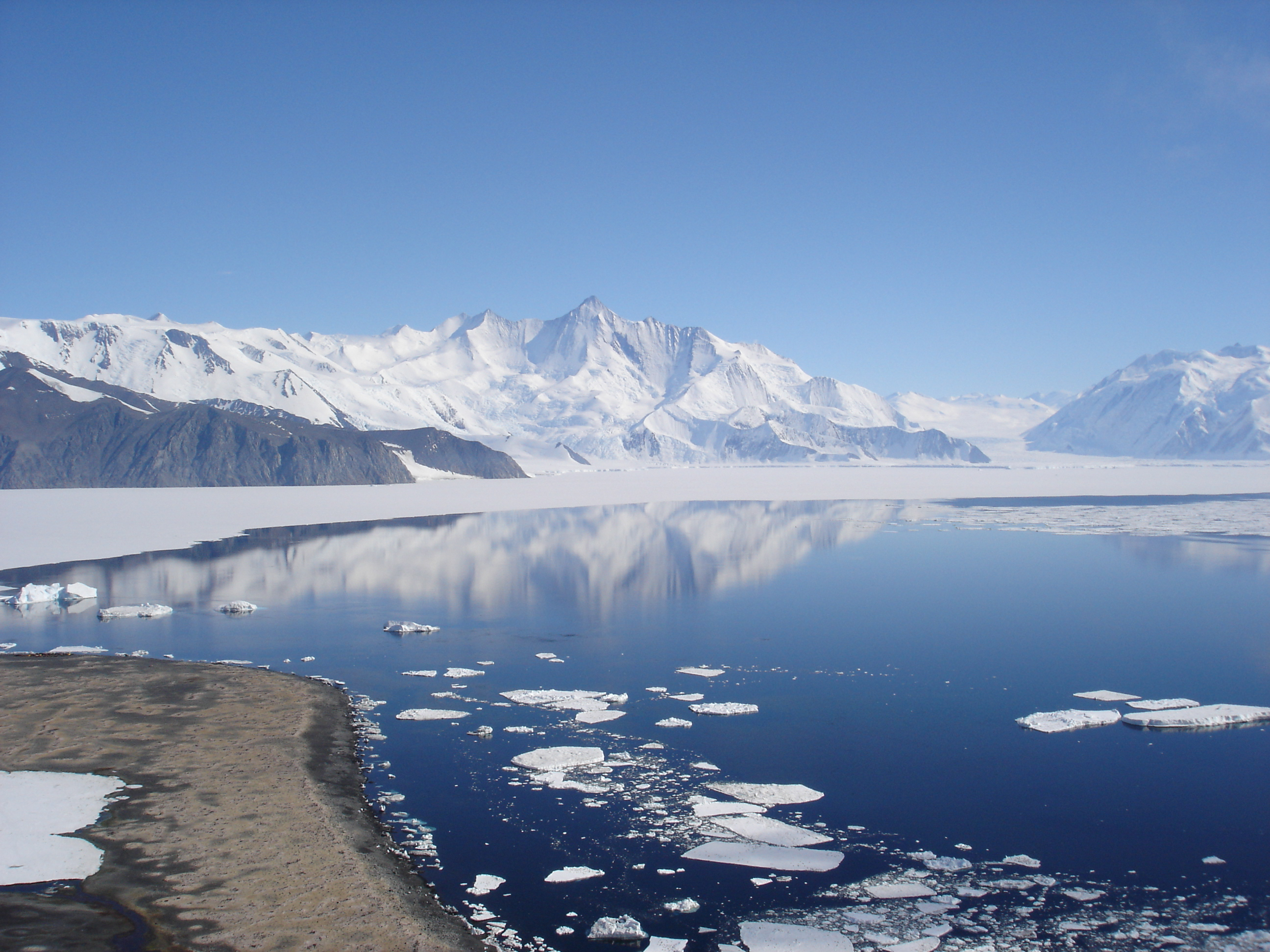
View of Mount Herschel from Cape Hallett

=== Mount Herschel ===
72°12′S 169°31′E. A conspicuous peak 3,335 metres (10,942 ft) high standing 1.6 nautical miles (3.0 km; 1.8 mi) northeast of Mount Peacock and overlooking the terminus of Ironside Glacier from the south . Discovered in 1841 by Sir James Clark Ross, who named this feature for Sir John Herschel, noted English astronomer.

=== Mount Peacock ===
72°13′S 169°27′E. A high peak 3,210 metres (10,530 ft) high standing directly at the head of Kelly Glacier, 1.6 nautical miles (3.0 km; 1.8 mi) southwest of Mount Herschel. Discovered in January 1841 by Sir James Clark Ross who named it for the Very Reverend Doctor George Peacock, Dean of Ely.

== Sources ==
- Alberts, Fred G., ed. (1995), Geographic Names of the Antarctic (PDF) (2 ed.), United States Board on Geographic Names This article incorporates public domain material from websites or documents of the United States Board on Geographic Names.
- Cape Hallet, USGS: United States Geological Survey

This article incorporates public domain material from websites or documents of the United States Geological Survey.
