= New Zealand Antarctic Research Programme =

The New Zealand Antarctic Research Programme (NZARP) was a research programme that operated a permanent research facility in Antarctica from 1959 to 1996. It was created by the Geophysics Division of New Zealand's Department of Scientific and Industrial Research (DSIR), originally based in Wellington. The programme promoted research in geochemistry, zoology, geology, botany, meteorology, and limnology.

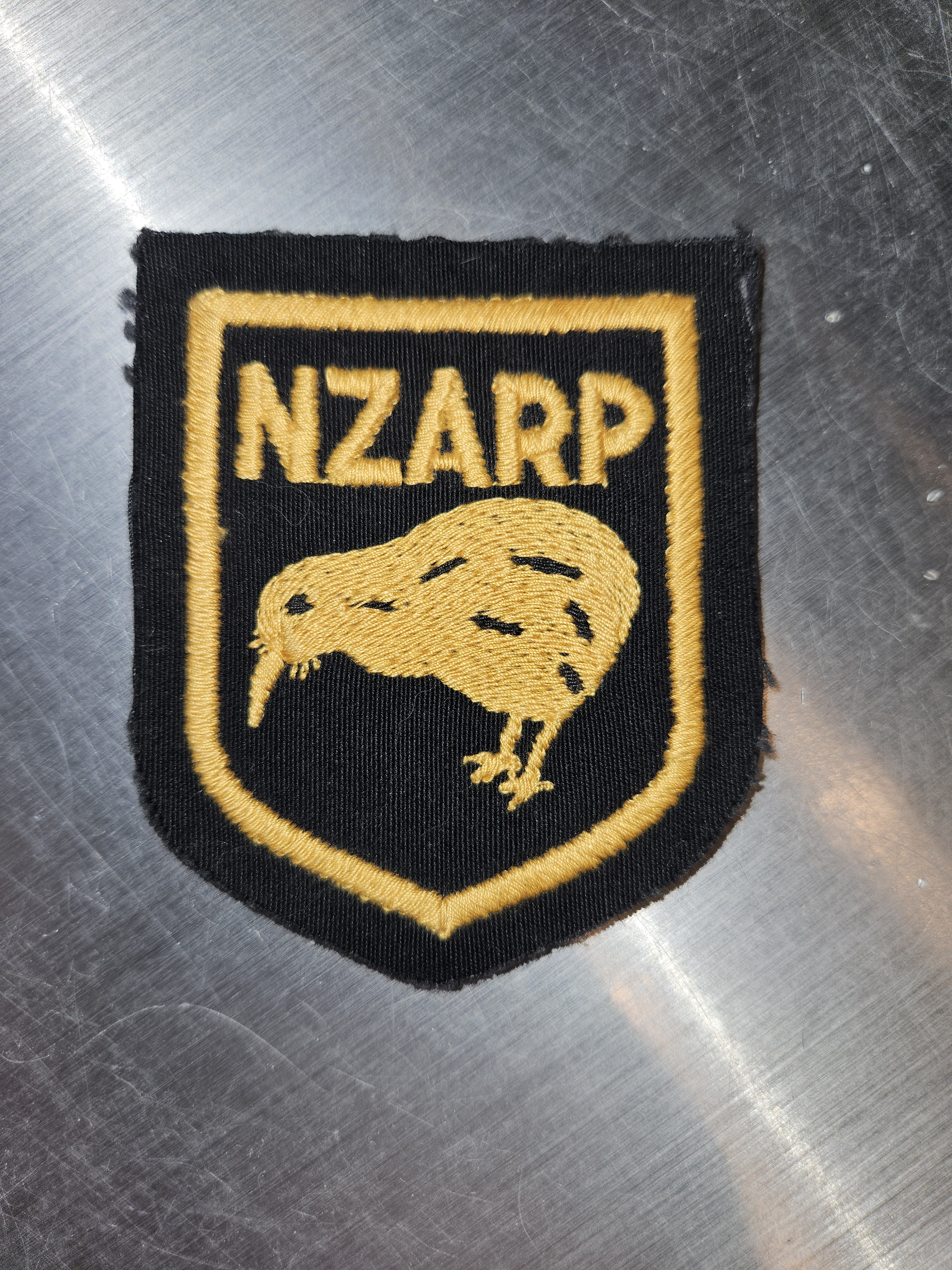
This is the unit insignia for the now former New Zealand Antarctic Research Program

== History ==
NZARP began as a proposal by the New Zealand government, in 1953, for a research base in Antarctica. Its mission was to provide support for a variety of scientific fieldwork in Antarctica. Members worked as researchers, assistants, tour guides, operators, and administrators to Scott Base.

Ground was broken for Scott Base on 10 January 1957. Assembly of the base began 12 January, conducted by the eight men who first assembled the base in Wellington, and was completed by 20 January. In 1959, the NZARP was established to work with the Ross Dependency Research Committee in the Ross Dependency (New Zealand's claim to a defined sector in Antarctica). In 1962, because of the important research being conducted, Scott Base became a permanent research station in Antarctica. The NZARP was in charge of maintaining the base. They hired people to act as field safety leaders and assist scientists during research projects.

When the DSIR was broken up to form the Crown Research Institutes in 1992, National Institute of Water and Atmospheric Research took over the NZARP.

== Accomplishments and expeditions ==
In 1967, the first tetrapod remains in Antarctica were discovered by New Zealander Peter Barrett, his finding eventually lending support to the theory of continental drift. Two years later, in 1969, an NZARP party of six women became the first women to reach the South Pole. Some more of NZARP's discoveries include, Ball Glacier, Atkinson Glacier, Findlay Range, Thomas Heights, and Mount Bradshaw.

== Legacy ==
In 1996, the New Zealand Antarctic Institute—also known as Antarctica New Zealand—took over the work of the NZARP. They now manage all of New Zealand's Antarctic undertakings. Only three buildings remain from the original base. The New Zealand Antarctic Institute also manages other research facilities, in the McMurdo Sound region, such as the Arrival Heights laboratory, which does atmospheric research.

A two-storey, 1,800-square-metre (19,000 sq ft) building was constructed in 2005, as a commissioned work by Antarctica New Zealand. This building, known as the Hillary Field Centre, provides an area for cargo receipt and issue, general and refrigerated storages, offices, gym, briefing and training rooms, and field equipment maintenance among many other uses. Because of this new building, New Zealand's science and environmental programs have been able to expand and improve through the years.

== See also ==
- List of organizations based in Antarctica
