= Robertson Bay =

Bay in Antarctica

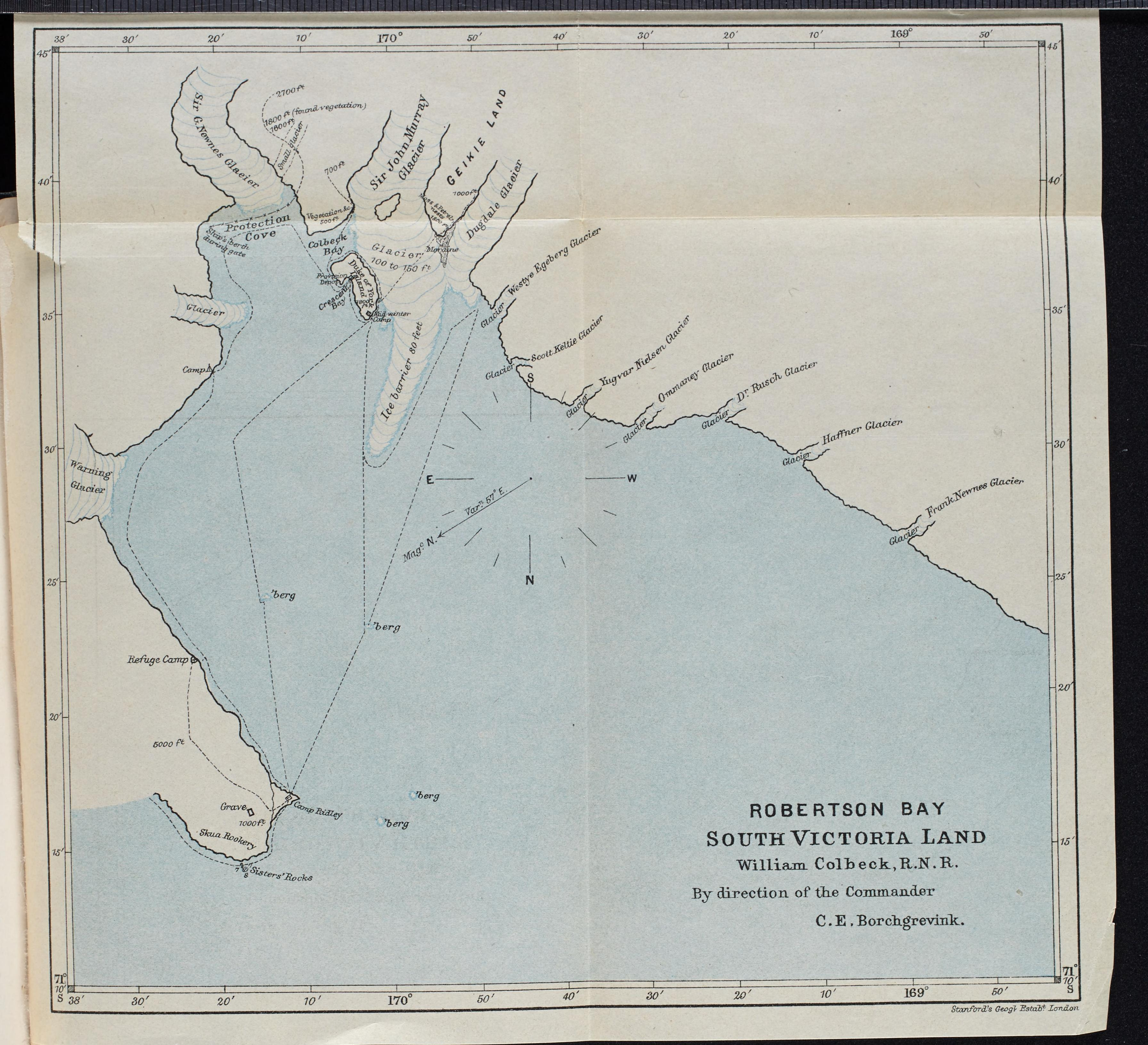
- Map of Robertson Bay, First on the Antarctic continent, 1901

- Location in Antarctica
- Location: Victoria Land
- Coordinates: 71°25′S 170°0′E

Robertson Bay (71°25′S 170°00′E) is a large, roughly triangular bay that indents the north coast of Victoria Land between Cape Barrow and Cape Adare. Discovered in 1841 by Captain James Clark Ross, Royal Navy, who named it for Dr. John Robertson, surgeon on HMS Terror.

== Features ==
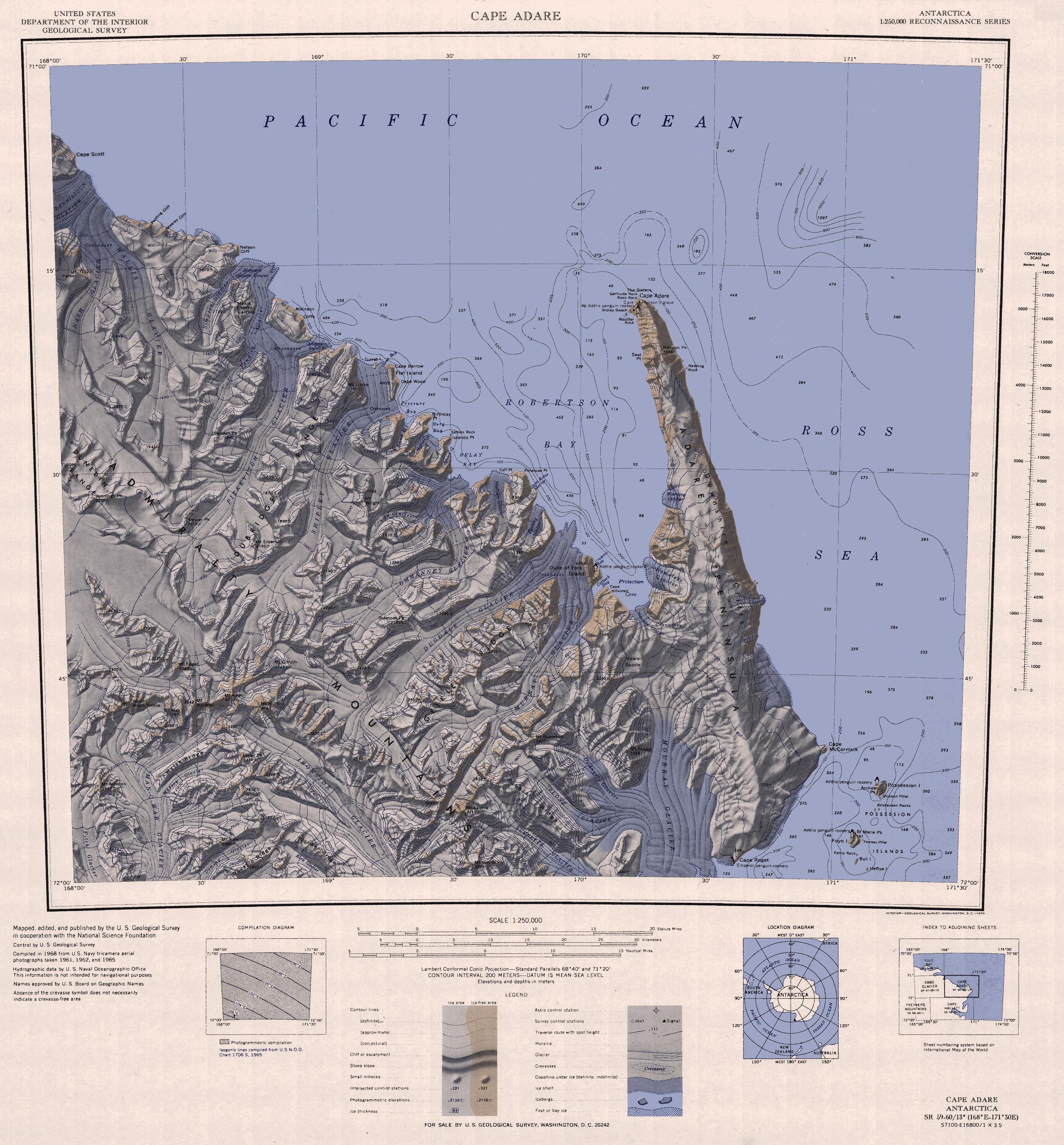
Robertson Bay in center of map

Robertson Bay extends between Cape Barrow in the west and Cape Adare in the east. Protection Cove in the south is the head of the bay. Cape Barrow is on Flat Island, east of Siren Bay and north of Cape Wood. Shipley Glacier divides and enters Robertson Bay to the west and to the south of the island, where it flows into Pressure Bay. Frank Newnes Glacier also flows into Pressure Bay, which is divided by Birthday Point from Berg Bay. Haffner Glacier empties into Berg Bay. The Sphinx Rock and Islands Point separate Berg Bay from Relay Bay.

Reusch Glacier, Crume Glacier, Ommanney Glacier and Nielsen Glacier drain into Relay Bay, the last entering beside Calf Point to the west of Penelope Point and the Scott Keltie Glacier. Southwest of this the Egeberg Glacier enters the bay just north of the Dugdale Glacier and the Murray Glacier, which enters the bay west of Duke of York Island, home of the Crescent Bay Adélie penguin rookery. Southeast of this are Colbeck Bay, Cape Klovstad and Protection Cove, which receives the Newnes Glacier and the Nameless Glacier. Warning Glacier flows into the bay from further north on the Adare Peninsula, which defines the east coast of the bay, extending north to Cape Adare.

== Glaciers ==
=== Shipley Glacier ===
71°26′S 169°12′E. A glacier, 25 nautical miles (46 km; 29 mi) long, in the north-central Admiralty Mountains. The glacier drains the northern slopes of Mount Adam and flows along the east wall of DuBridge Range to Pressure Bay. Some of the glacier bypasses Pressure Bay and reaches the sea west of Flat Island. The seaward end of the glacier was first mapped by the Northern Party, led by Victor Campbell, of the British Antarctic Expedition, 1910-13. Named by Campbell for Sir Arthur Shipley, master of Christ's College, Cambridge, England, at the suggestion of Priestley. The entire glacier was mapped by the United States Geological Survey (USGS) in 1960-63.

=== Mount Wright ===
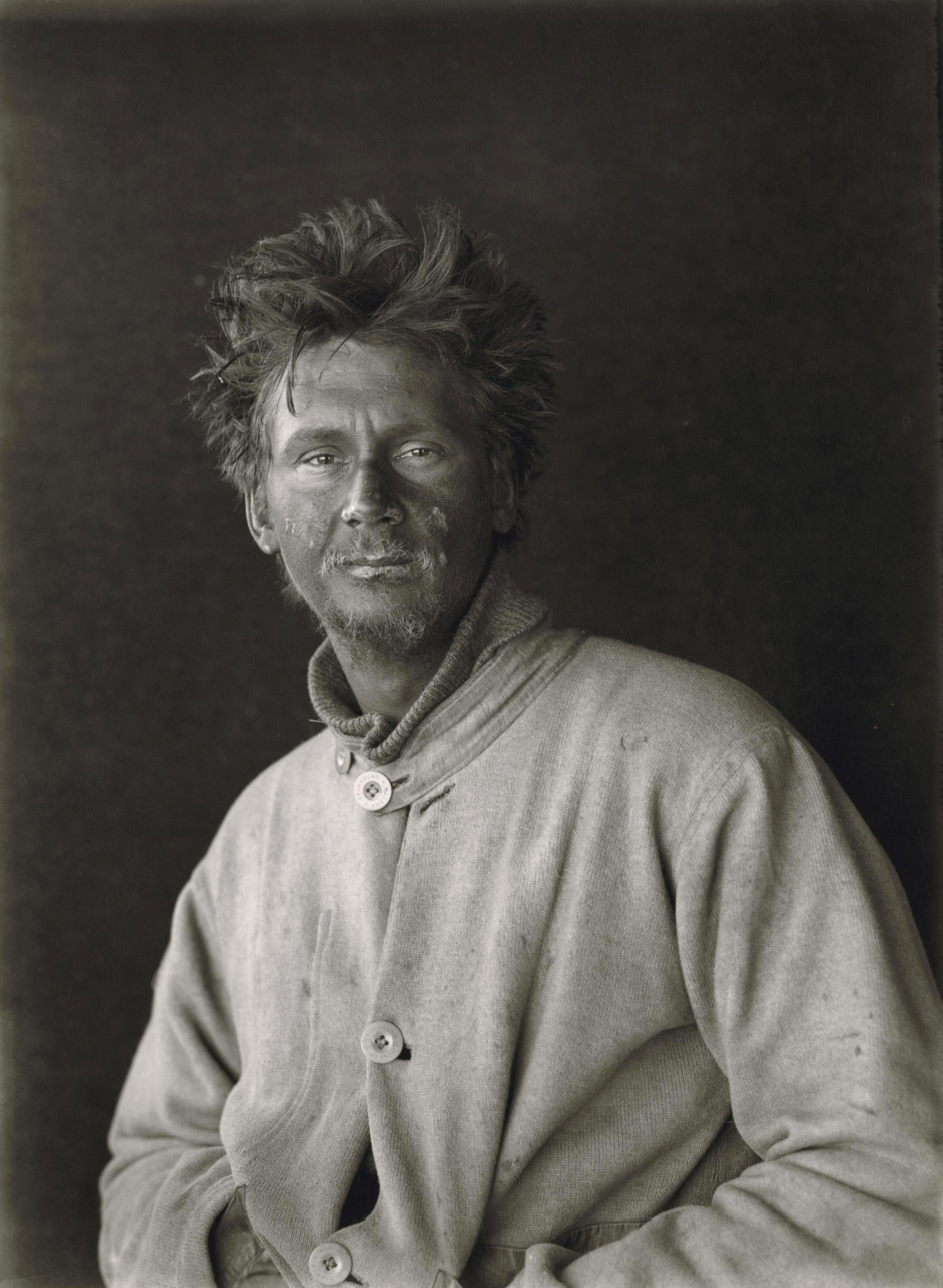
Charles Seymour Wright, 1912

71°33′S 169°10′E. A peak over 1,800 metres (5,900 ft) in the north part of the Admiralty Mountains, Victoria Land. It rises between Shipley Glacier and Crume Glacier, 8 nautical miles (15 km; 9.2 mi) southwest of Birthday Point. The feature was named by the BrAE, 1910-13, after Charles S. Wright (1887-1975), physicist with the expedition.

=== Frank Newnes Glacier ===
71°28′S 169°19′E. A short glacier discharging into the head of Pressure Bay. First charted by the British Antarctic Expedition, 1898-1900, which named the feature for Frank Newnes, the only son of the expedition sponsor, Sir George Newnes.

=== Haffner Glacier ===
71°28′S 169°24′E. A small glacier discharging into Berg Bay. First charted by the British Antarctic Expedition, 1898-1900, under Carsten Egeberg Borchgrevink, who named it for Colonel Haffner, Director of the Government Survey of Norway.

=== Reusch Glacier ===
71°29′S 169°29′E. A very small glacier descending into Relay Bay immediately east of Islands Point. First charted by British Antarctic Expedition, 1898-1900, under C.E. Borchgrevink, who named this feature for Professor Hans Henrik Reusch, then president of the Norwegian Geographical Society.

=== Crume Glacier ===
71°33′S 169°21′E. A tributary glacier, 5 nautical miles (9.3 km; 5.8 mi) long, flowing east to enter Ommanney Glacier near the north coast of Victoria Land. Mapped by the USGS from surveys and United States Navy air photos, 1960-63. Named by the United States Advisory Committee on Antarctic Names (US-ACAN) for William R. Crume, AS1, United States Navy, Support Equipment Maintenance Supervisor with Squadron VX-6 at McMurdo Station during Operation Deep Freeze 1968.

=== Ommanney Glacier ===
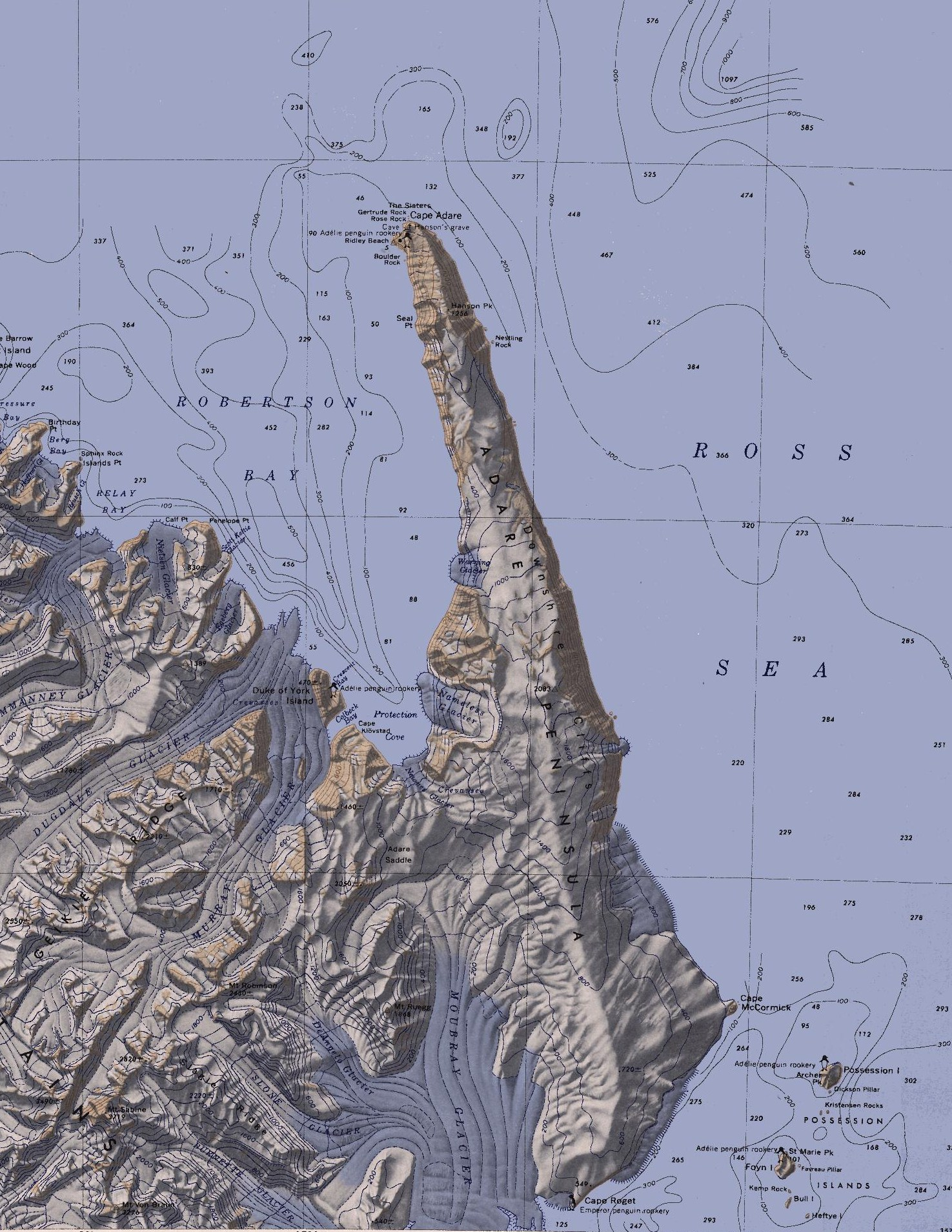
Adare Peninsula

71°32′S 169°29′E. Valley glacier, 20 nautical miles (37 km; 23 mi) long, meandering northward in the Admiralty Mountains to discharge into Relay Bay, on the west side of Robertson Bay. Charted by the British Antarctic Expedition, 1898-1900, under C.E. Borchgrevink, who named it for Admiral Sir Erasmus Ommanney, who had served in the Arctic Expedition of 1850.

=== Nielsen Glacier ===
71°31′S 169°41′E. Glacier, 4 nautical miles (7.4 km; 4.6 mi) long, discharging into the west side of Robertson Bay just west of Calf Point. First charted by the British Antarctic Expedition, 1898-1900, under C.E. Borchgrevink, who named it for Prof. Yngvar Nielsen of Christiania University, Norway.

=== Scott Keltie Glacier ===
71°32′S 169°49′E. A very small glacier discharging into Robertson Bay between Penelope Point and Egeberg Glacier. First charted by the British Antarctic Expedition, 1898-1900, under C.E. Borchgrevink. He named it for Sir John Scott Keltie, Secretary of the Royal Geographical Society.

=== Egeberg Glacier ===
71°34′S 169°50′E. A small glacier between Scott Keltie Glacier and Dugdale Glacier, flowing into the west side of Robertson Bay. First charted by the British Antarctic Expedition, 1898-1900, under C.E. Borchgrevink, who named it for Consul Wye Egeberg of Christiania (now Oslo), Norway.

=== Dugdale Glacier ===
71°38′S 169°50′E. A glacier about 25 nautical miles (46 km; 29 mi) long, draining northeast from the Admiralty Mountains into Robertson Bay. It flows along the west side of Geikie Ridge before coalescing with Murray Glacier just west of Duke of York Island. Charted by the British Antarctic Expedition, 1898-1900, under C.E. Borchgrevink, who named it for Frank Dugdale, Esq., of Snitterfield, Stratford-on-Avon.

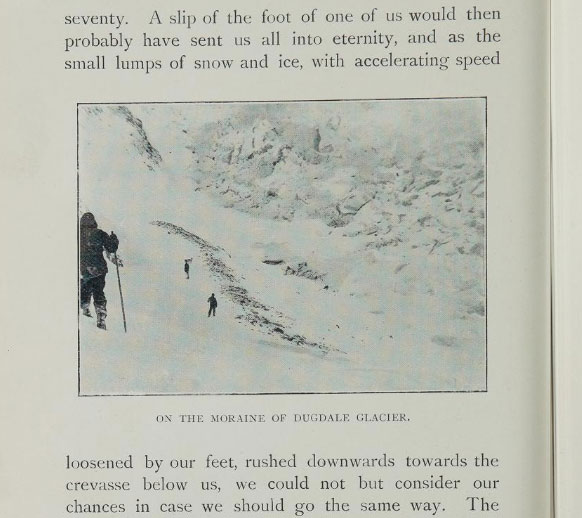
Moraine at Dugdale Glacier, ca November 1899 by Carsten Borchgrevink

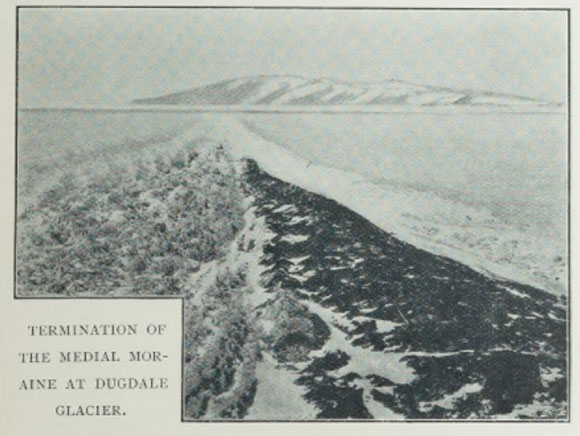
Termination of Moraine at Dugdale Glacier ca November 1899, by Carsten Borchgrevink

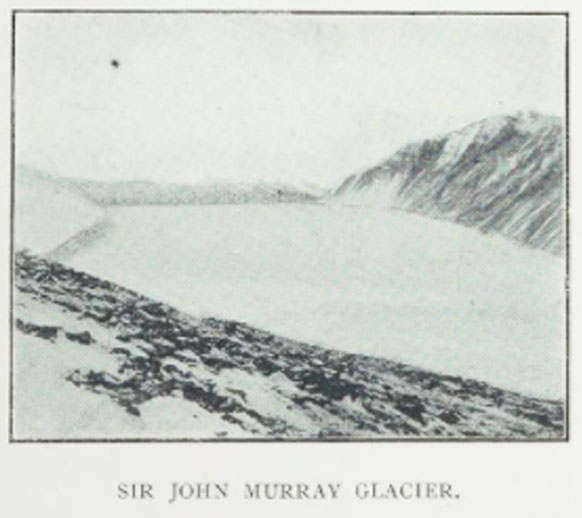
Murray Glacier ca. November 1899 by Carsten Borchgrevink

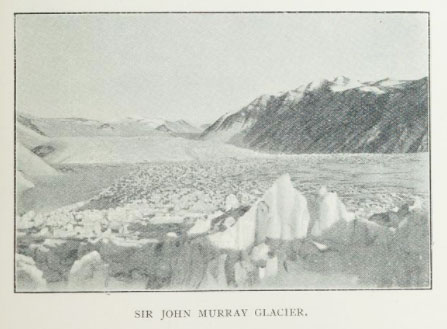
Murray Glacier c. 1900

=== Geikie Ridge ===
71°44′S 169°36′E. A massive mountain ridge, 20 nautical miles (37 km; 23 mi) long and 6 nautical miles (11 km; 6.9 mi) wide, forming the divide between Dugdale Glacier and Murray Glacier. First charted by the BrAE, 1898-1900, under C.E. Borchgrevink, who named the high land between these glaciers Geikie Land, after Sir Archibald Geikie. The generic "Land" has been changed to "Ridge," since it was not appropriate for so small a feature, but Borchgrevink's intent in naming the whole mass has been respected.

=== Murray Glacier ===
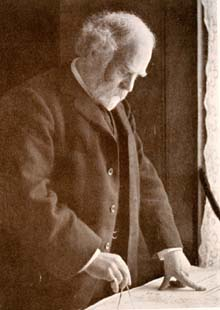
Sir John Murray

71°39′S 170°00′E. A valley glacier, 20 nautical miles (37 km; 23 mi) long, draining seaward along the east side of Geikie Ridge in the Admiralty Mountains. Its terminus coalesces with that of Dugdale Glacier where both glaciers discharge into Robertson Bay. First charted by the British Antarctic Expedition, 1898-1900, under C.E. Borchgrevink, who named this feature for Sir John Murray of the Challenger expedition, 1872-76.

=== Newnes Glacier ===
71°41′S 170°14′E. A glacier that drops sharply from the Adare Saddle to empty into Protection Cove at the head of Robertson Bay. Charted by the British Antarctic Expedition, 1898-1900, under C.E. Borchgrevink, who named it for Sir George Newnes, sponsor of the expedition.

=== Nameless Glacier ===
71°38′S 170°18′E. A glacier that descends westward from Adare Peninsula and discharges into Protection Cove, Robertson Bay, 2 nautical miles (3.7 km; 2.3 mi) north of Newnes Glacier. It was charted and named by the Northern Party of the British Antarctic Expedition, 1910-13. This was the only one of the Robertson Bay glaciers that was left unnamed by C.E. Borchgrevink, who headed the British Antarctic Expedition, 1898-1900.

=== Warning Glacier ===
71°32′S 170°21′E. A glacier descending sharply on the west side of Adare Peninsula to discharge into Robertson Bay 4 nautical miles (7.4 km; 4.6 mi) north of Nameless Glacier. First charted by the British Antarctic Expedition, 1898-1900, under C.E. Borchgrevink. The feature was so named by Borchgrevink because southerly gales at Cape Adare were always heralded by a cloud of snow sweeping over this glacier into Robertson Bay.

== Other features ==
=== Cape Barrow ===
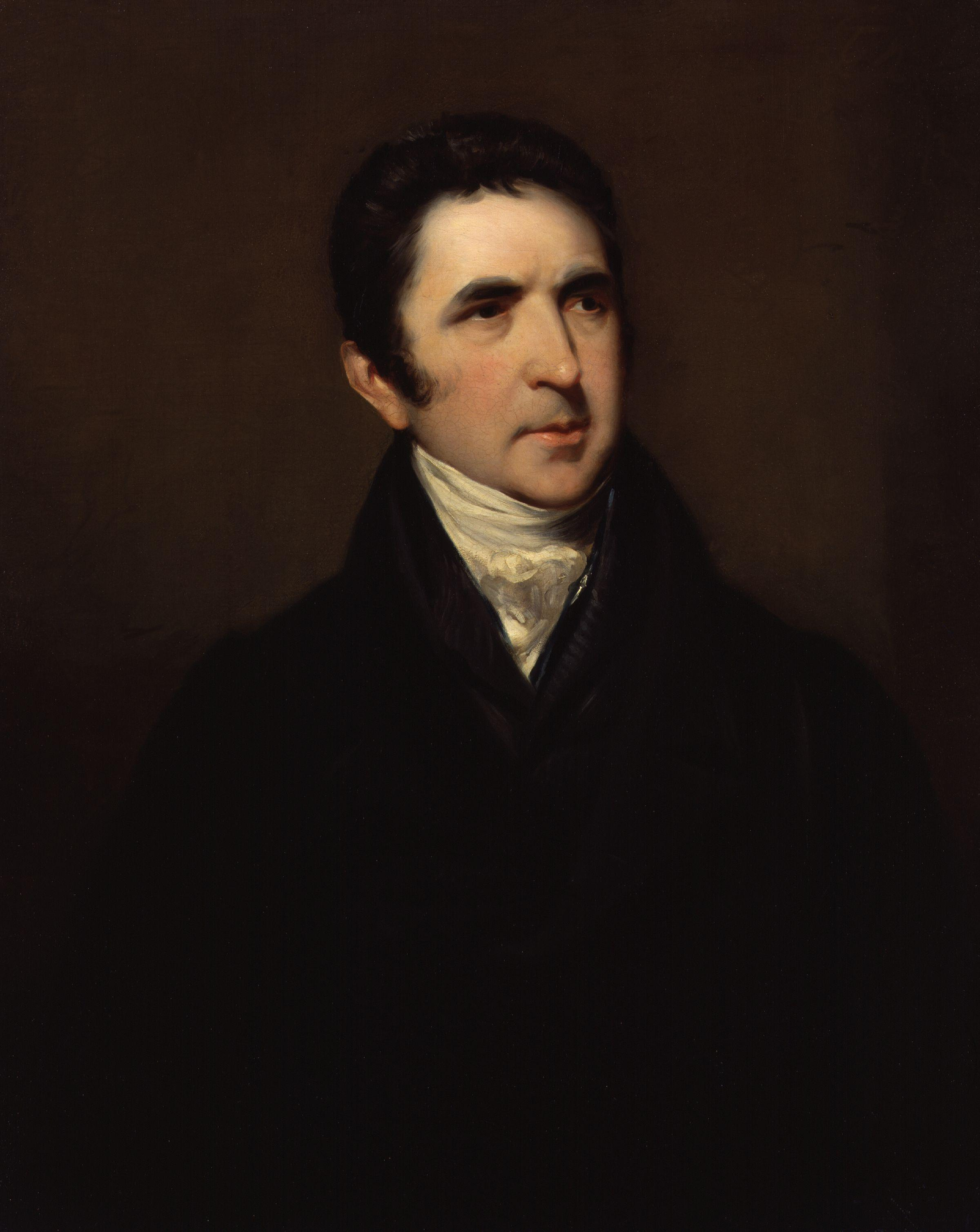
Sir John Barrow, 1st Baronet

71°22′S 169°17′E. The high, northern point of Flat Island, marking the west side of the entrance to Robertson Bay. Capt. James Ross, in January 1840, applied this name to a cape of the mainland, honouring Sir John Barrow, founder of the Royal Geographical Society, 1830, and Secretary of the Admiralty, 1807-45. The feature was mapped as a point on Flat Island by the British Antarctic Expedition, 1910-13, led by Scott.

=== Flat Island ===
71°24′S 169°18′E. A 480 metres (1,570 ft) high flat-topped island, 3 nautical miles (5.6 km; 3.5 mi) long, lying at the terminus of Shipley Glacier. Its northeast tip, Cape Barrow, marks the west side of the entrance to Robertson Bay. First charted and given this descriptive name by the British Antarctic Expedition, 1910-13.

=== Siren Bay ===
71°22′S 169°15′E. A small bay formed by the configuration of the ice at the terminus of Shipley Glacier and the northwest side of Flat Island. Charted by the Northern Party, led by Campbell, of the British Antarctic Expedition, 1910-13, and so named by them because they heard a noise like a ship's siren while mapping this area.

=== Cape Wood ===
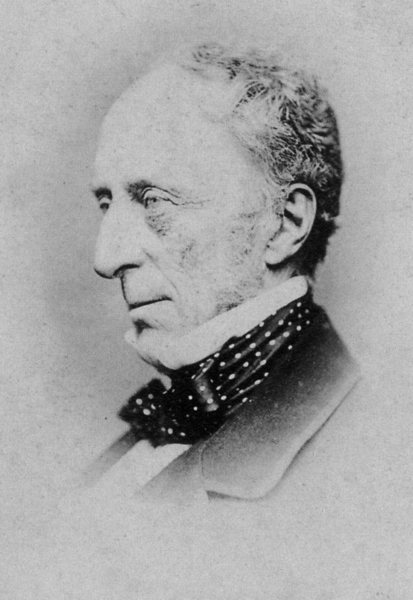
Charles Wood, 1st Viscount Halifax

71°24′S 169°18′E. A point marking the east extremity of Flat Island at the western entrance to Robertson Bay. Discovered in January 1841 by Captain James Ross, Royal Navy, and named by him for Charles Wood, First Secretary to the Admiralty.

=== Pressure Bay ===
71°25′S 169°20′E. An arm of Robertson Bay, 3 nautical miles (5.6 km; 3.5 mi) wide, lying between Cape Wood and Birthday Point. Charted and named in 1911 by the Northern Party, led by Campbell, of the British Antarctic Expedition, 1910-13. The Northern Party experienced great difficulty in sledging across the pressure ice fringing the shore of Robertson Bay. This pressure was caused by the adjacent Shipley Glacier descending to the sea ice.

=== Birthday Point ===
71°26′S 169°24′E. A bold rock point between Pressure Bay and Berg Bay. Charted and named by the Northern Party, led by Campbell, of the British Antarctic Expedition, 1910-13.

=== Berg Bay ===
71°27′S 169°27′E. Small bay between Birthday Point and Islands Point in the west side of Robertson Bay. Charted and named in 1911 by the Northern Party led by Victor Campbell of the British Antarctic Expedition, 1910-13, because icebergs appear to gravitate there. Haffner Glacier which flows into this bay may also contribute icebergs.

=== Sphinx Rock ===
71°27′S 169°30′E. A high rock (or island) lying in front of Islands Point in the west part of Robertson Bay. Charted by the Northern Party, led by Campbell, of British Antarctic Expedition, 1910-13, who named it for its shape.

=== Islands Point ===
71°28′S 169°31′E. A high rock point separating Berg Bay and Relay Bay, lying along the west shore of Robertson Bay. Charted by the Northern Party of British Antarctic Expedition, 1910-13, under Capt. Robert Scott. Probably named with reference to the small island (Sphinx Rock) which lies just north of the point.

=== Relay Bay ===
71°30′S 169°32′E. An arm of Robertson Bay, about 5 nautical miles (9.3 km; 5.8 mi) wide, lying between Islands Point and Penelope Point. First visited on Oct. 4, 1911 by the Northern Party, led by Victor Campbell, of the British Antarctic Expedition, 1910-13. So named because they found it necessary to relay their sledges owing to the heavy pressure ridges encountered here. The Nielsen, Ommanney, Crume and Reusch Glaciers flowing into the bay contribute to these pressures.

=== Calf Point ===
71°30′S 169°45′E. A point between the terminus of Nielsen Glacier and Penelope Point on the west shore of Robertson Bay. Charted and named in 1911 by the Northern Party, led by Campbell, of the British Antarctic Expedition 1910-13. Named because of the great number of young seals seen here.

=== Penelope Point ===
71°30′S 169°47′E. A bold rock headland between Nielsen Glacier and Scott Keltie Glacier. First charted by the Northern Party, led by Campbell, of the British Antarctic Expedition, 1910-13. Named by them after the nickname "Penelope" given to Lieutenant Harry Lewin Lee Pennell, commander of the expedition ship Terra Nova.

=== Duke of York Island ===
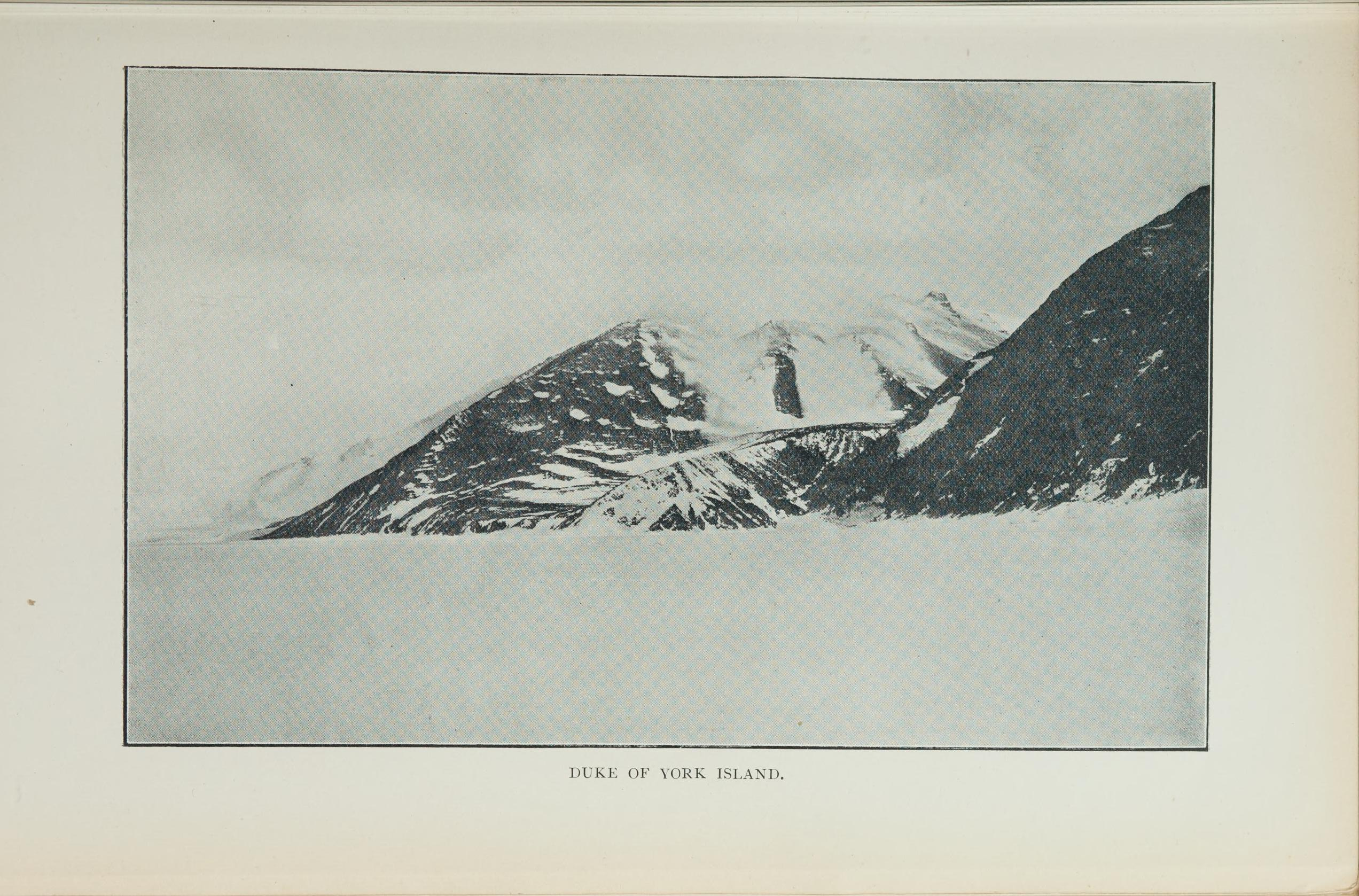
Duke of York Island

71°38′S 170°04′E. A mountainous ice-free island, 2.5 nautical miles (4.6 km; 2.9 mi) long, lying in the south part of Robertson Bay. First charted in 1899 by the British Antarctic Expedition under C.E. Borchgrevink, who named it for the Duke of York.

=== Crescent Bay ===
71°37′S 170°04′E. A cove in the northeast side of Duke of York Island in Robertson Bay. Charted and so named because of its shape by the British Antarctic Expedition, 1898-1900, under C.E. Borchgrevink. The feature is the site of an Adélie penguin rookery.

=== Colbeck Bay ===
71°38′S 170°05′E. A cove between Duke of York Island and Cape Klovstad in the south part of Robertson Bay. First charted by British Antarctic Expedition, 1898-1900, under C.E. Borchgrevink, who named it for Lieutenant William Colbeck, RNR, magnetic observer of the expedition.

=== Cape Klövstad ===
71°39′S 170°06′E. A rugged rock point between Colbeck Bay and Protection Cove in the south part of Robertson Bay. First charted by British Antarctic Expedition, 1898-1900, under C.E. Borchgrevink, who named the feature for Dr. Herlof Klovstad, Medical Officer of the expedition.

=== Protection Cove ===
71°39′S 170°12′E. A bay, 3 nautical miles (5.6 km; 3.5 mi) wide, lying at the east side of Cape Klovstad where it forms the head of Robertson Bay. First charted by British Antarctic Expedition, 1898-1900, under C.E. Borchgrevink, and so named because the expedition ship Southern Cross found protection here during a gale.

== Sources ==
- Alberts, Fred G., ed. (1995), Geographic Names of the Antarctic (PDF) (2 ed.), United States Board on Geographic Names This article incorporates public domain material from websites or documents of the United States Board on Geographic Names.
- Borchgrevink, Carsten (1901), First on the Antarctic continent: Being an account of the British Antarctic expedition, 1898-1900
- Cape Adare, USGS: United States Geological Survey

This article incorporates public domain material from websites or documents of the United States Geological Survey.
