= Pitkevitch Glacier =

Glacier in Antarctica

- Location within Antarctica
- Location: Victoria Land
- Coordinates: 71°23′S 168°52′E

Pitkevitch Glacier (71°23′S 168°52′E) is a glacier, 20 nautical miles (37 km; 23 mi) long, flowing north from the Admiralty Mountains along the west side of DuBridge Range in Antarctica. The glacier reaches the sea just east of Atkinson Cliffs, where it forms Anderson Icefalls. A portion of the terminus merges northwestward with Fendley Glacier.

== Exploration and naming ==
The Pitkevitch Glacier was mapped by United States Geological Survey (USGS) from surveys and United States Navy air photos, 1960–63. It was named by United States Advisory Committee on Antarctic Names (US-ACAN) for Staff Sergeant Leonard M. Pitkevitch, United States Air Force (USAF), who perished in the crash of a C-124 Globemaster aircraft in this vicinity in 1958.

== Location ==
The Pitkevitch Glacier forms in the Admiralty Mountains to the south of Brewer Peak, and flows northeast along the west side of the DuBridge Range, which includes Mount Emerson and Mount Locke. The Shipley Glacier flow along the east side of the DuBridge Range The Pitkevitch Glacier flows past Crandall Peak to its west. At the Atkinson Cliffs some of its ice splits off to join the Fendley Glacier while the remainder descends through the Anderson Icefalls to the Pacific Ocean on the north coast of Victoria Land.

== Features ==
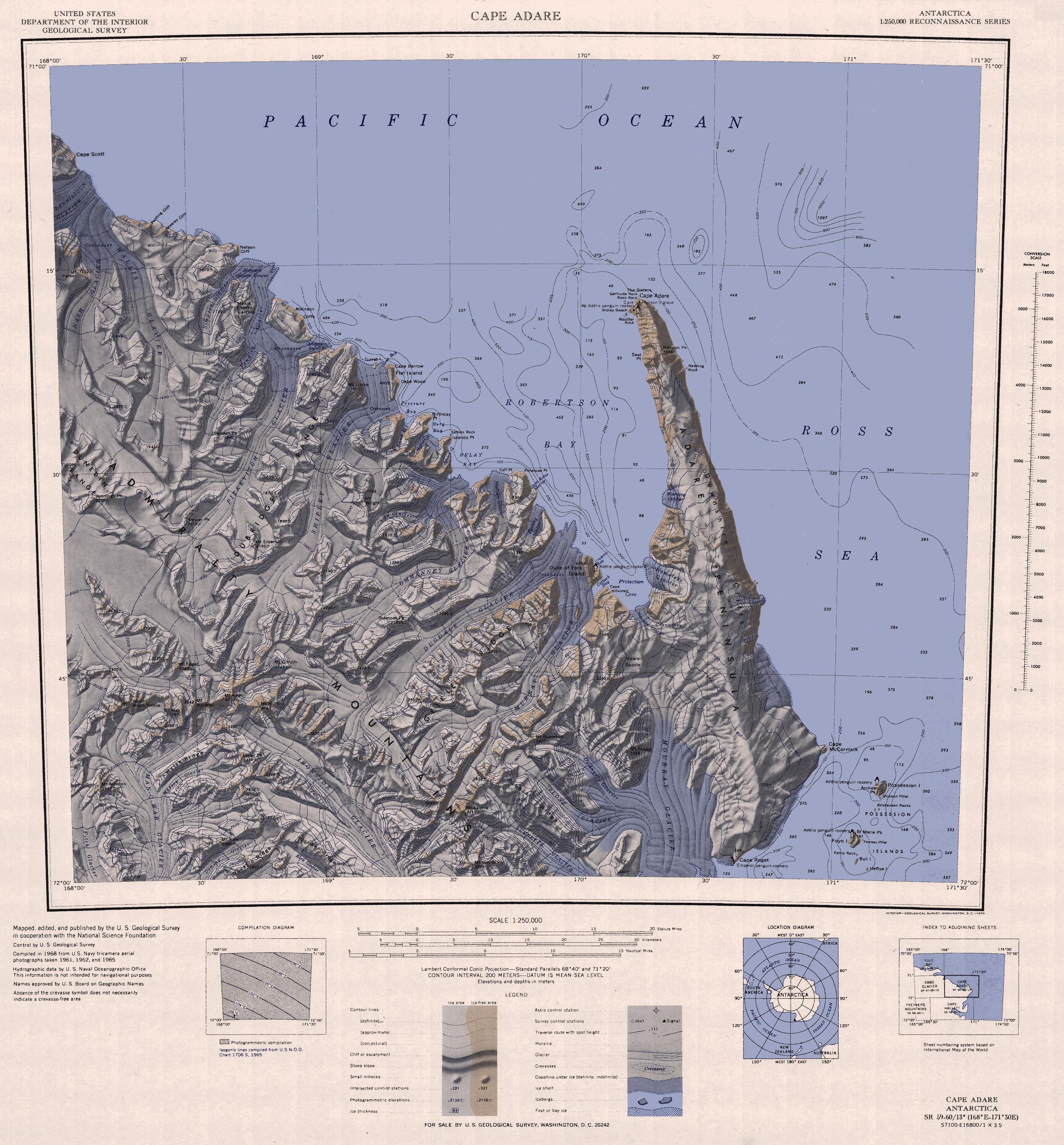
Pitkevitch Glacier towards northwest

=== Brewer Peak ===
71°34′S 168°28′E. A peak 2,110 metres (6,920 ft) high along the west wall of Pitkevitch Glacier near the glacier's head. Mapped by USGS from surveys and United States Navy air photos, 1960-63. Named by US-ACAN for Thomas J. Brewer, CS1, United States Navy, Commissaryman at McMurdo Station, 1967.

=== DuBridge Range ===
71°30′S 168°53′E. A mountain range over 20 nautical miles (37 km; 23 mi) long in the Admiralty Mountains. The range trends southwest-northeast. between Pitkevitch Glacier and Shipley Glacier and terminates at the north coast of Victoria Land just west of Flat Island. Mapped by USGS from surveys and U.S Navy air photos, 1960-63. Named by US-ACAN for Lee DuBridge, member of the National Science Board for several years, Science Advisor to the President of the United States, 1969-70.

=== Mount Emerson ===
71°35′S 168°44′E. A mountain 2,190 metres (7,190 ft) high 5 nautical miles (9.3 km; 5.8 mi) east-southeast of Brewer Peak in the south part of DuBridge Range. Mapped by USGS from surveys and United States Navy air photos, 1960-63. Named by US-ACAN for George L. Emerson, SW1, United States Navy, Steelworker at McMurdo Station, 1967.

=== Mount Locke ===
71°24′S 169°06′E. A snow-capped coastal peak 1,190 metres (3,900 ft) high at the northeast end of DuBridge Range. Mapped by USGS from surveys and United States Navy air photos, 1960-63. Named by US-ACAN for Lieutenant Commander Jerry L. Locke, United States Navy, helicopter pilot with Squadron VX-6 during Operation Deep Freeze 1968.

=== Crandall Peak ===
71°27′S 168°41′E. A mostly snow-covered peak 1,840 metres (6,040 ft) high located mid-way along the west wall of Pitkevitch Glacier. Mapped by USGS from surveys and United States Navy air photos 1960-63. Named by US-ACAN for Lieutenant Eugene D. Crandall, United States Navy Reserve, Aircraft Commander (LC-130F) with Squadron VX-6 during Operation Deep Freeze 1968.

=== Atkinson Cliffs ===
71°18′S 168°55′E. High coastal cliffs, 4 nautical miles (7.4 km; 4.6 mi) long, between the lower ends of Fendley Glacier and Pitkevitch Glacier on the north coast of Victoria Land. The feature was mapped in 1911 by the Northern Party of the British Antarctic Expedition, 1910–13 (BrAE), and named for Doctor Edward L. Atkinson, surgeon of the expedition.

=== Anderson Icefalls ===
71°21′S 169°00′E. Icefalls at the lower end of Pitkevitch Glacier terminating in a cliff face 30 metres (98 ft) high, located just southeast of Atkinson Cliffs. Charted in 1911 by Commander Victor L.A. Campbell's Northern Party of the BrAE, 1910-13. Named by the BrAE probably for Mr. Anderson of the firm, John Anderson and Sons, Engineers, who owned Lyttelton Foundry, and took great interest in the expedition.

== Sources ==
- Alberts, Fred G., ed. (1995), Geographic Names of the Antarctic (PDF) (2 ed.), United States Board on Geographic Names This article incorporates public domain material from websites or documents of the United States Board on Geographic Names.
- Cape Adare, USGS: United States Geographic Board

This article incorporates public domain material from websites or documents of the United States Geological Survey.
