= Dennistoun Glacier =

Glacier in Antarctica

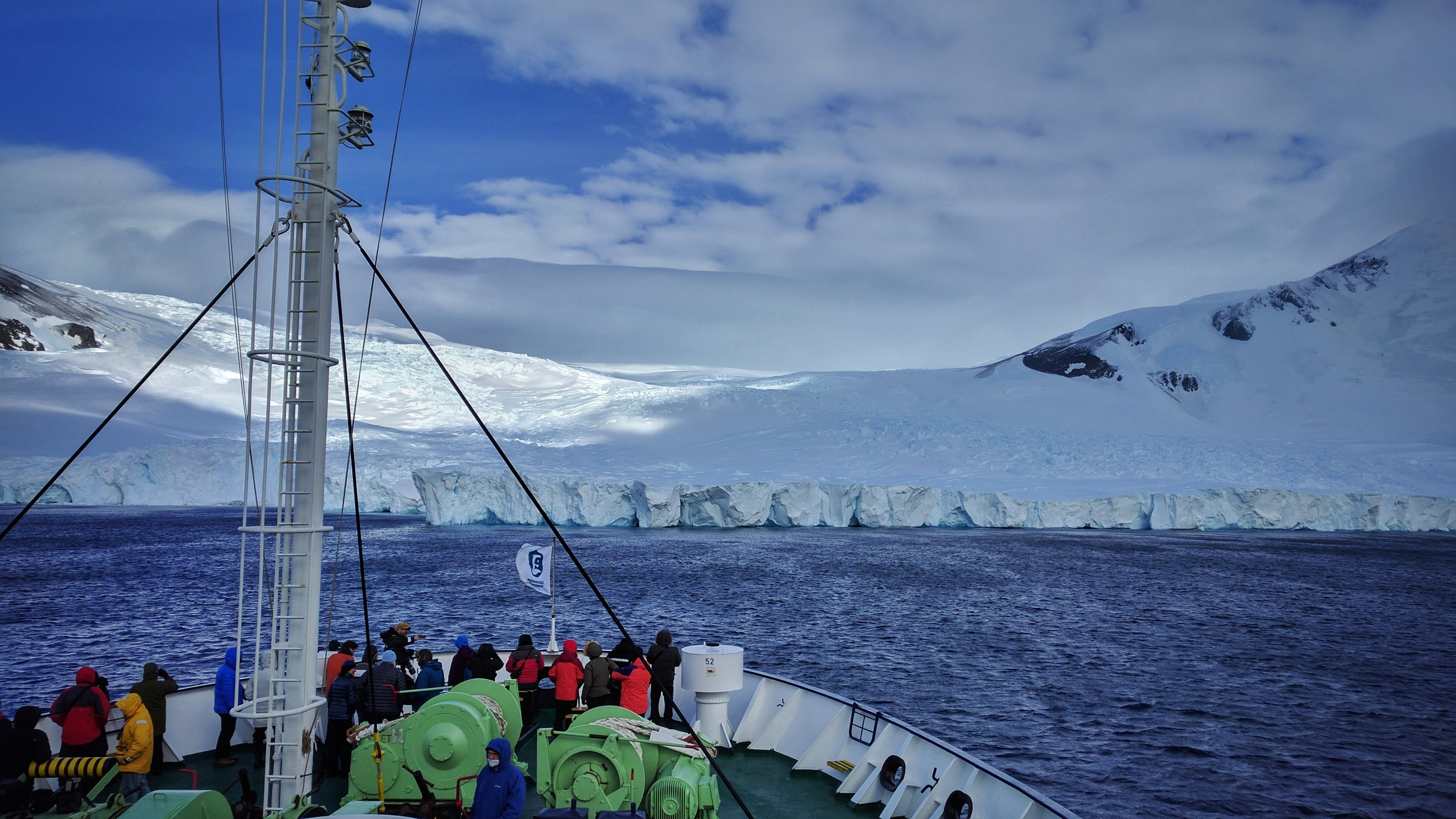
- MV Ortelius before Dennistoun Glacier in February 2017

- Location within Antarctica
- Type: tributary
- Location: Victoria Land
- Coordinates: 71°11′S 168°0′E
- Length: 50 nmi (90 km; 60 mi)
- Thickness: unknown
- Terminus: Cape Scott
- Status: unknown

The Dennistoun Glacier (71°11′S 168°0′E) is a glacier, 50 nautical miles (93 km; 58 mi) long, draining the northern slopes of Mount Black Prince, Mount Royalist and Mount Adam in the Admiralty Mountains of Victoria Land, Antarctica. It flows northwest between the Lyttelton Range and Dunedin Range, turning east on rounding the latter range to enter the sea south of Cape Scott.

== Exploration and naming ==
The coastal extremity of the Dennistoun Glacier was charted in 1911–12 by the Northern Party, led by Victor Campbell, of the British Antarctic Expedition, 1910–13 (BrAE). The glacier is named after Jim Dennistoun, a New Zealand alpinist who was in charge of the mules on board the Terra Nova on her way to Antarctica. The entire extent of the glacier was mapped by the United States Geological Survey from surveys and United States Navy aerial photography, 1960–63. The name Fowlie Glacier, which in fact refers to a tributary glacier, has sometimes been inadvertently misapplied to this feature.

== Location ==
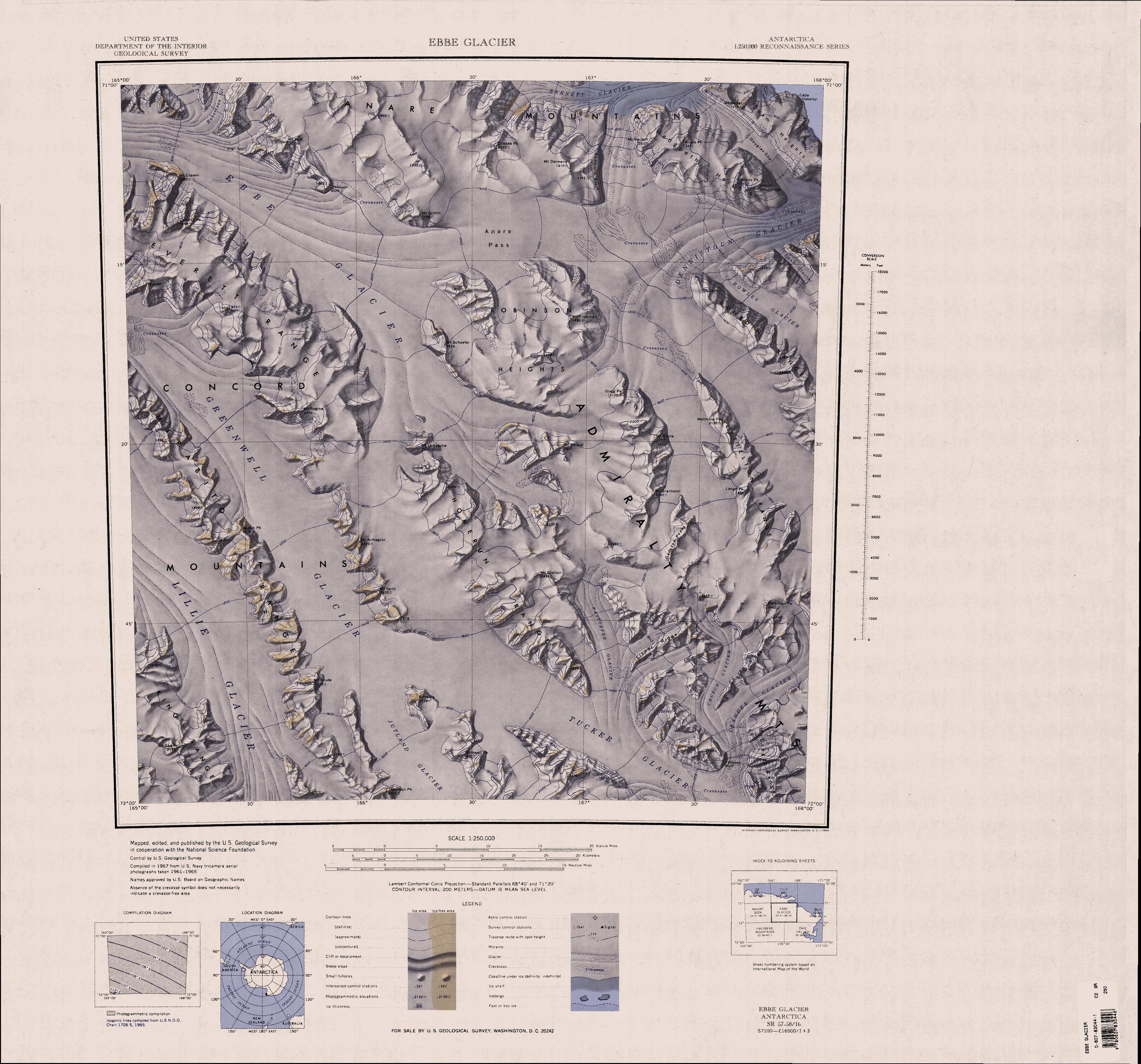
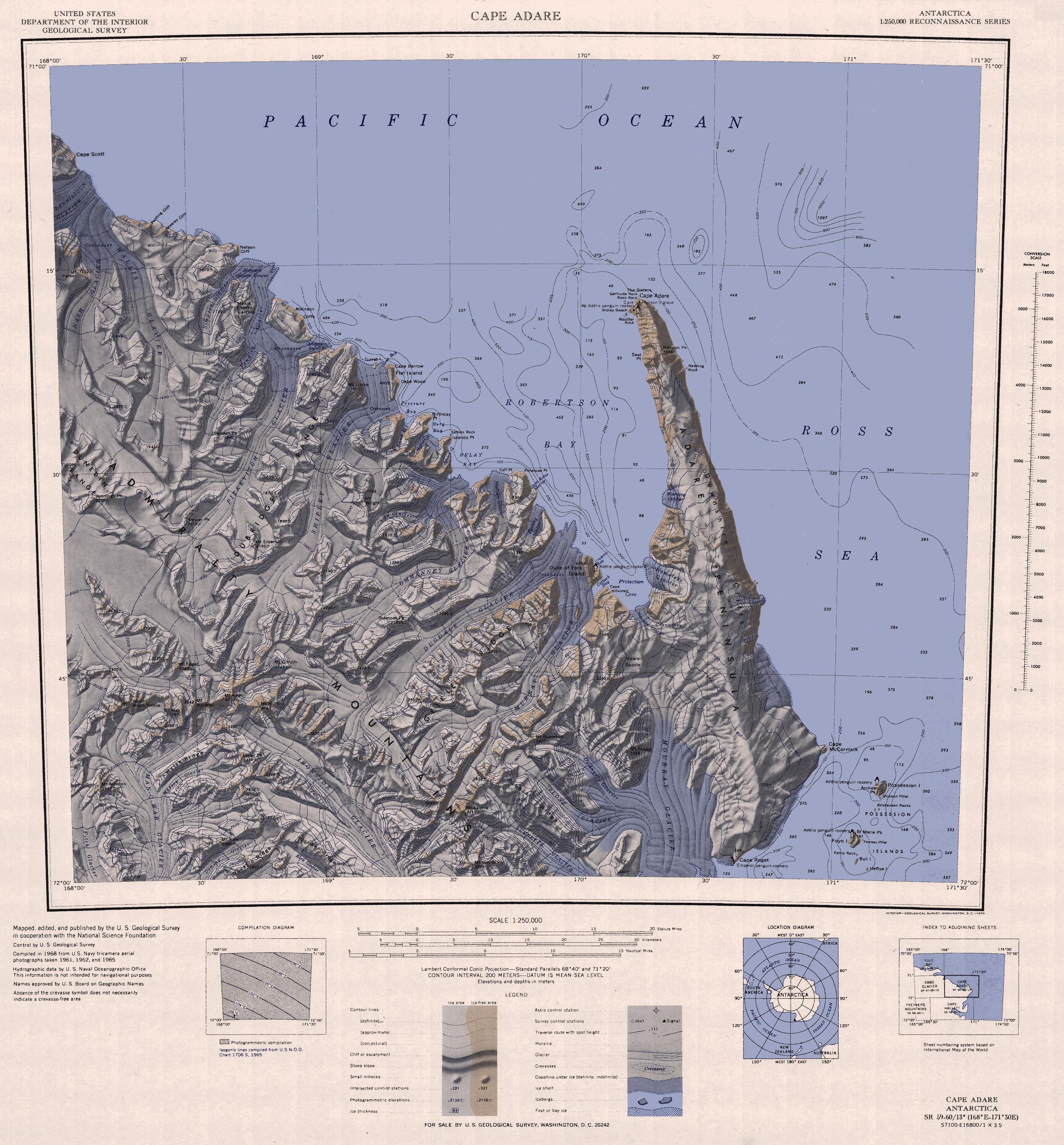
Dennistoun Glacier in northeast of left map, northwest of right map

The Dennistoun Glacier rises in the Admiralty Mountains between the Lyttelton Range and the Dunedin Range. The Anare Pass is to its west, forming a route to the Ebbe Glacier. The Dennistoun Glacier flows north and then east, fed by the Rowles Glacier and Lann Glacier from the southeast. It passes the Hedgpeth Heights and Quam Heights to the north in the Anare Mountains. It enters the sea to the southeast of Cape Scott and northwest of Ponting Cliff and Meares Cliff. At its mouth it is joined from the south by Nash Glacier and Wallis Glacier, which flow from the Dunedin Range past Mount Parker to the west of their mouths.

== Features ==
=== Atkinson Glacier ===
71°30′S 167°25′E. A glacier between Findlay Range and Lyttelton Range, flowing northward into Dennistoun Glacier. Named by the New Zealand Antarctic Place-Names Committee (NZ-APC) in 1983 after William Atkinson, field assistant, New Zealand Antarctic Division, mechanic with the New Zealand Antarctic Research Programme (NZARP) geological party to the area, 1981-82, led by R.H. Findlay.

=== Fowlie Glacier ===
71°40′S 168°04′E. A tributary glacier, 13 nautical miles (24 km; 15 mi) long, in the Admiralty Mountains. From a common head with Dennistoun Glacier, it flows northwest between Mount Ajax and Mount Faget, entering the main flow of the Dennistoun Glacier at the southeast base of the Lyttelton Range. Named after Walter Fowlie of the New Zealand Antarctic Division, field assistant with a NZARP geological party to this area, 1981-82, led by R.H. Findlay. The original application of the name (NZ-APC, United States Advisory Committee on Antarctic Names or US-ACAN, 1983) was revised in 1994 in relation to Dennistoun Glacier.

=== Rowles Glacier ===
71°17′S 167°39′E. Tributary glacier over 20 nautical miles (37 km; 23 mi) long, flowing northwest along the east side of Dunedin Range to enter Dennistoun Glacier. Mapped by the United States Geological Survey (USGS) from surveys and United States Navy air photos, 1960-63. Named by US-ACAN for D.S. Rowles of the New Zealand Dept. of Scientific and Industrial Research, a member of the Hallett Station party, 1964.

=== Lann Glacier ===
71°15′S 167°54′E. A steep tributary glacier, 3 nautical miles (5.6 km; 3.5 mi) long, in the north end of Admiralty Mountains. The glacier is 4 nautical miles (7.4 km; 4.6 mi) east of Rowles Glacier and flows northwest to enter Dennistoun Glacier. Mapped by USGS from surveys and United States Navy air photos, 1960-63. Named by US-ACAN for Roy R. Lann, United States Navy cook at Hallett Station, 1964.

=== Ponting Cliff ===
71°12′S 168°21′E. An angular cliff that is similar in appearance to Meares Cliff just eastward, located 3 nautical miles (5.6 km; 3.5 mi) east of the terminal confluences of the Dennistoun, Nash and Wallis Glaciers. First charted by the Northern Party, led by Campbell, of the BrAE, 1910-13, which named it for Herbert G. Ponting, photographer of the expedition.

=== Meares Cliff ===
71°12′S 168°25′E. An angular coastal cliff that rises to 600 metres (2,000 ft) high, located 5.5 nautical miles (10.2 km; 6.3 mi) west-northwest of Nelson Cliff along the north coast of Victoria Land. First charted by the Northern Party, led by Campbell, of the BrAE, 1910-13. Named by Campbell for Cecil H. Meares who had charge of the dogs on this expedition.

=== Mount Parker ===
71°15′S 168°05′E. A bluff-type mountain 1,260 metres (4,130 ft) high along the west side of Nash Glacier. Mapped by USGS from surveys and United States Navy air photos, 1960-63. The name Mount Parker was given to a mountain in this general vicinity by Captain James Ross, RN, in 1840, honoring V. Admiral Sir William Parker, a senior naval lord of the Admiralty, 1834 41. For the sake of historical continuity US-ACAN has retained the name for this mountain.

=== Nash Glacier ===
71°15′S 168°10′E. A glacier, 20 nautical miles (37 km; 23 mi) long, draining the north slopes of Dunedin range. The terminus of this glacier merges with that of Wallis Glacier and Dennistoun Glacier before reaching the sea east of Cape Scott. Mapped by USGS from surveys and United States Navy air photos, 1960-63. Named by US-ACAN for Lieutenant Arthur R. Nash, United States Navy, helicopter pilot with Squadron VX-6 during Operation Deep Freeze 1967 and 1968.

=== Wallis Glacier ===
71°14′S 168°15′E. A glacier nearly 20 nautical miles (37 km; 23 mi) long in the northwest part of the Admiralty Mountains. The glacier flows north and then northwest, eventually coalescing with the lower portions of Dennistoun and Nash Glaciers just before all three reach the sea just east of Cape Scott. Mapped by USGS from surveys and United States Navy air photos, 1960-63. Named by US-ACAN for Staff Sergeant Nathaniel Wallis, who perished in the crash of a C-154 Globemaster aircraft in this vicinity in 1958.

== Sources ==
- Alberts, Fred G., ed. (1995), Geographic Names of the Antarctic (PDF) (2 ed.), United States Board on Geographic Names This article incorporates public domain material from websites or documents of the United States Board on Geographic Names.
- Cape Adare, USGS: United States Geographic Board
- Ebbe Glacier, USGS: United States Geographic Board

This article incorporates public domain material from websites or documents of the United States Geological Survey.
