= Gibraltar Peak =

Mountain in Victoria Land, Antarctica

Gibraltar Peak is a peak in Antarctica.

== Location ==
It is located at 72°5′S 164°59′E and is a peak 1 nautical mile (2 km) southeast of Lavallee Peak, in the West Quartzite Range of Victoria Land, Antarctica. The peak lies situated on the Pennell Coast, a portion of Antarctica lying between Cape Williams and Cape Adare.

== History ==
It was named by the New Zealand Geological Survey Antarctic Expedition, 1967–68, because it is shaped like the famous Rock of Gibraltar. The name was officially decided by the U.S. Board on Geographic Names in 1969.

It is included in the United States Gazetteer and the SCAR Composite Gazetteer of Antarctica.

== Biodiversity ==
The Australian Antarctic Data Centre has not recorded any fauna near the peak. Bryum, a type of moss, been located near the peak.
