= Halverson Peak =

Mountain in Antarctica

Halverson Peak (71°47′S 164°44′E) is a peak, 1,710 metres (5,600 ft) high, which marks the east side of the terminus of Rawle Glacier, in the King Range of the Concord Mountains of Victoria Land, Antarctica. This topographical feature was first mapped by the United States Geological Survey from surveys and U.S. Navy air photos, 1960–64, and was named by the Advisory Committee on Antarctic Names for Jack E. Halverson, U.S. Navy, chief electronics technician and member of the McMurdo Station party, 1967. The peak lies situated on the Pennell Coast, a portion of Antarctica lying between Cape Williams and Cape Adare.
