= Toilers Mountain =

Mountain in Victoria Land, Antarctica

Toilers Mountain (71°44′S 164°52′E) is a massive peak (1,955 m) standing 4 nautical miles (7 km) northeast of Halverson Peak in the northwest end of the King Range, Concord Mountains. The peak was used as a gravity station by the northern party of New Zealand Geological Survey Antarctic Expedition (NZGSAE), 1963–64. So named by them because of the long climb and unpleasant conditions encountered in occupying the summit.
