= Mount Mannering =

Mountain in Ross Dependency, Antarctica

Mount Mannering (71°48′S 164°57′E) is a mountain 4 nautical miles (7 km) south-southeast of Toilers Mountain in the King Range, Concord Mountains, Antarctica. It was named by the northern party of the New Zealand Geological Survey Antarctic Expedition, 1963–64, for Guy Mannering, a photographer at Scott Base, 1962–63.
