= Pennell Coast =

Coastline along the Victoria Land in Antarctica

Coordinates: 71°0′S 167°0′E

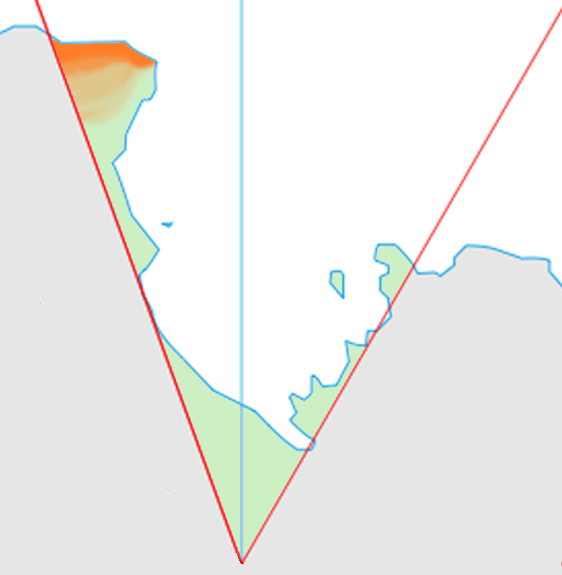
Location of the Pennell Coast (marked in orange) within the Ross Dependency

Pennell Coast is that portion of the coast of Antarctica between Cape Williams and Cape Adare. To the west of Cape Williams lies Oates Coast, and to the east and south of Cape Adare lies Borchgrevink Coast. Named by New Zealand Antarctic Place-Names Committee (NZ-APC) in 1961 after Lieutenant Harry Pennell, Royal Navy, commander of the Terra Nova, the expedition ship of the British Antarctic Expedition, 1910–13. Pennell engaged in oceanographic work in the Ross Sea during this period. In February 1911 he sailed along this coast in exploration and an endeavor to land the Northern Party led by Lieutenant Victor Campbell.

The name is also used more loosely to refer to both the coast itself and the hinterland extending south to the watershed of the Southern Cross Mountains to the southeast and the Usarp Mountains to the west.

Major features of the coast include the 250-kilometer long Rennick Glacier (one of Antarctica's largest glaciers), the Anare Mountains, and the northern ends of the Bowers and Admiralty mountain ranges. Inland, the land is dominated by numerous smaller mountain ranges (notably the Freyberg Mountains and the Concord Mountains), and by two large névés, the Rennick Névé and the Evans Névé.

== Other Features ==
- Dwyer Escarpment
- Jago Nunataks
