= Mannering =

Mannering is a surname. Notable people with the surname include:

- Cecil Mannering (1886–1974), Scottish film actor
- Émilie Mannering, Canadian film director
- Fred Mannering (born 1954), American professor of civil and environmental engineering
- George Edward Mannering (1862–1947), New Zealand banker, mountaineer and writer
- Julia Mannering, pseudonym of English writer Madeleine Bingham (1912–1988)
- Mary Mannering (1876–1953), Anglo-American actress
- Sarah Mannering, Canadian film producer
- Simon Mannering (born 1986), New Zealand professional rugby league player

Fictional characters

- John Mannering, in The Baron TV series
- John Mannering, in John Creasey's Baron novels, and the basis of the character above

== See also ==
- Guy Mannering or The Astrologer, a novel by Sir Walter Scott
- Mannering Park, New South Wales, Australia
- Mount Mannering, Antarctica
- Mount Mannering (New Zealand)
- Mainwaring, a surname
- Manwaring, a surname
- Manring, a surname
