= Smith Inlet =

Smith Inlet may refer to:

- Smith Inlet (Palmer Land), Antarctica
- Smith Inlet (Victoria Land), Antarctica
- Smith Inlet (British Columbia), Canada
