= Zykov Glacier =

Glacier in Antarctica

- Location within Antarctica
- Type: Outlet glacier
- Location: East Antarctica
- Coordinates: 70°37′S 164°46′E
- Terminus: Southern Ocean

Zykov Glacier (70°37′S 164°46′E) is a valley glacier about 25 nautical miles (46 km; 29 mi) long in the Anare Mountains of Victoria Land, Antarctica. It flows northwest and reaches the coast between Cape Williams and Cooper Bluffs. It was photographed by the Soviet Antarctic Expedition (SovAE) in 1958 and named for student navigator Ye. Zykov, who died in Antarctica, Feb. 3, 1957.

== Geology ==
The underlying rock includes micaceous phyllite and micaceous schist; it was estimated by radioisotope dating (potassium–argon) in 1964 to be 410 or 420 million years old. A separate study of metamorphic rocks recovered from near the glacier (1959–62) found evidence of thermal crystallisation.

== Location ==
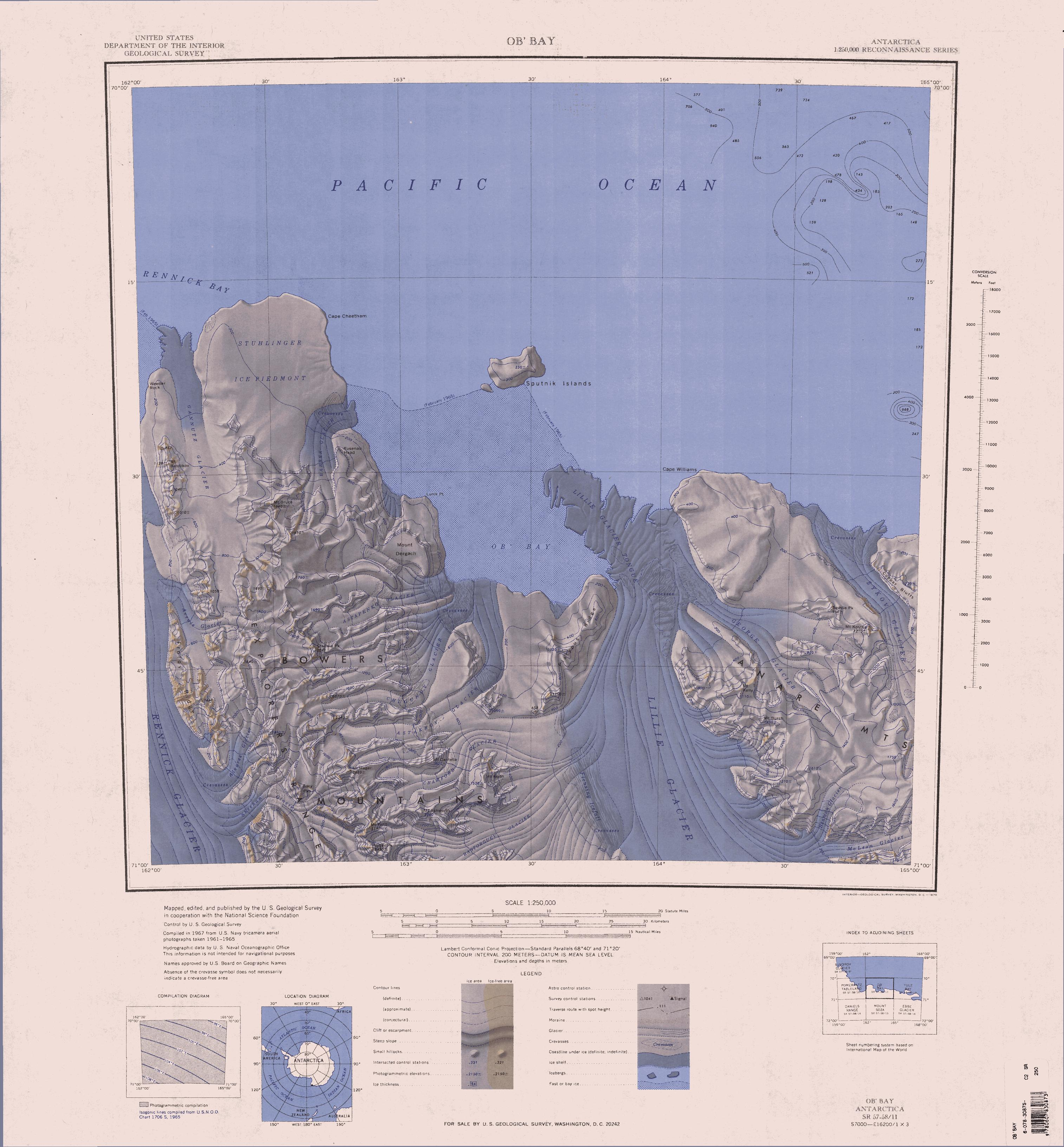
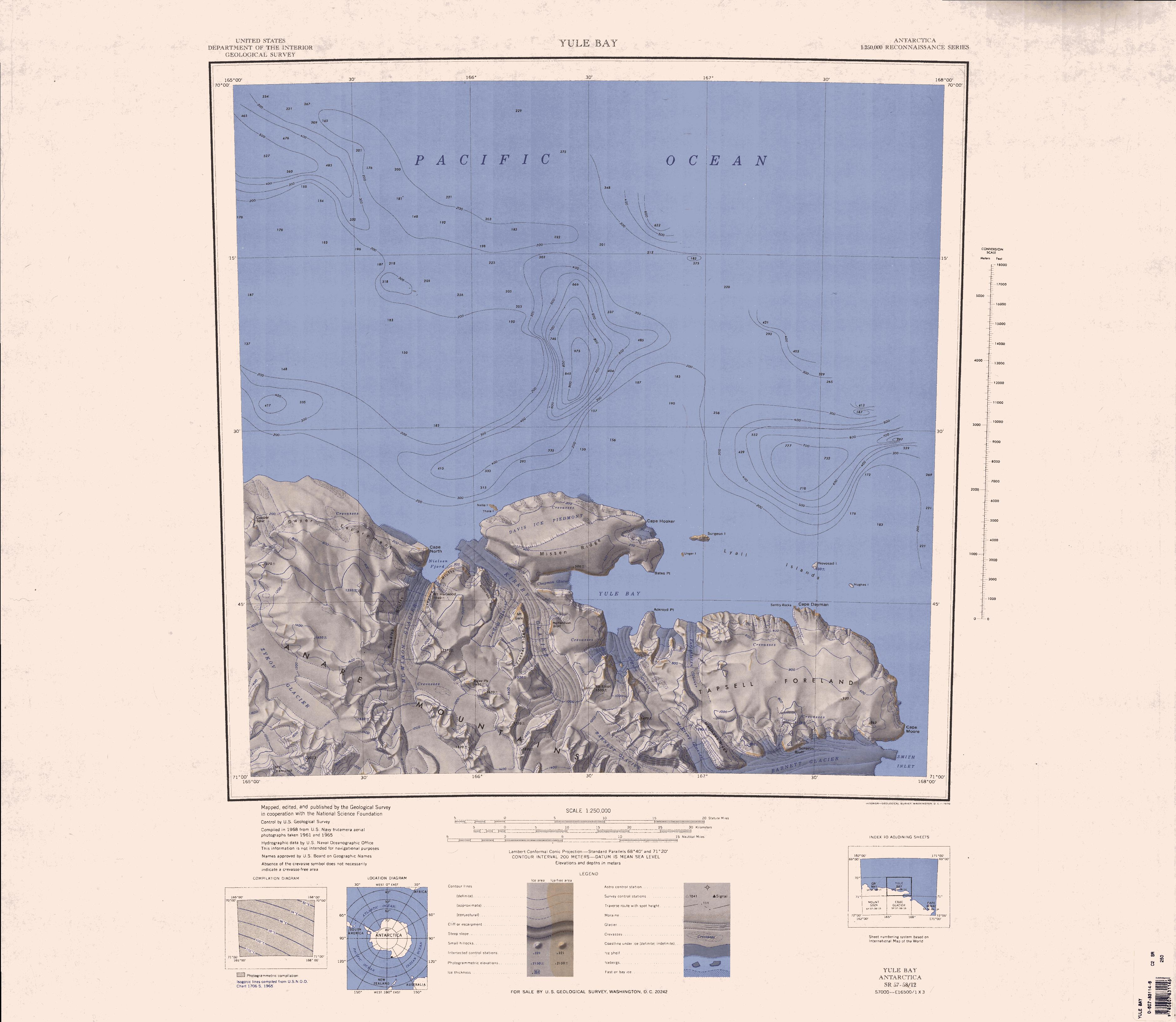
Anare Mountains extend along the coast east of Lillie Glacier in upper maps, southern part in north of lower maps

The Zykov Glacier forms in the Anare Mountains to the north of Mount Hemphill and west of McMahon Glacier. It flows northeast past the Cooper Spur and Cooper Bluffs to the east, and the Buell Peninsula to the west, to enter the Pacific Ocean to the east of Cape Williams.

== Features ==
=== Cooper Spur ===
70°38′S 165°03′E. A narrow spur extending north from the east end of Cooper Bluffs, on the north coast of Victoria Land. Mapped by the United States Geological Survey (USGS) from surveys and United States Navy air photos, 1960-63. Named by the United States Advisory Committee on Antarctic Names (US-ACAN) for Ronald R. Cooper, BUG, United States Navy, Chief Builder with the McMurdo Station winter party, 1967.

=== Cooper Bluffs ===
70°39′S 164°56′E. High, ice-covered coastal bluffs on the east side of Zykov Glacier, near the mouth of the glacier, in the Anare Mountains. Named by the Australian National Antarctic Research Expedition (ANARE) for Flying Officer G. Cooper, RAAF, a member of the Antarctic Flight with the ANARE (Thala Dan), 1962, which explored the area.

== Sources ==
- Alberts, Fred G., ed. (1995), Geographic Names of the Antarctic (PDF) (2 ed.), United States Board on Geographic Names This article incorporates public domain material from websites or documents of the United States Board on Geographic Names.
- Ob' Bay, USGS: United States Geographic Board
- Sturm, A.; Carryer, S.J. (1970), "Geology of the region between the Matusevich and Tucker Glaciers, north Victoria Land, Antarctica", New Zealand Journal of Geology and Geophysics, 13 (2): 408–35, doi:10.1080/00288306.1970.10423977
- Yule Bay, USGS: United States Geographic Board

This article incorporates public domain material from websites or documents of the United States Geological Survey.
