= East Quartzite Range =

Mountain ranges of Victoria Land

- Location within Antarctica

Highest point
- Elevation: 1,859 m (6,099 ft)

Geography
- Continent: Antarctica
- Region(s): Victoria Land, Antarctica
- Range coordinates: 72°0′S 165°5′E

The East Quartzite Range (72°0′S 165°5′E) is a mountain range, 12 nautical miles (22 km; 14 mi) long, forming a subordinate southwest unit of the King Range, in the Concord Mountains of Victoria Land, Antarctica. These mountains lie approximately 5 nautical miles (9.3 km; 5.8 mi) east of the nearby West Quartzite Range. It was named by the Northern Party of the New Zealand Federated Mountain Clubs Antarctic Expedition (NZFMCAE), 1962–63, after the distinctive geological formation of the feature.

== Location ==
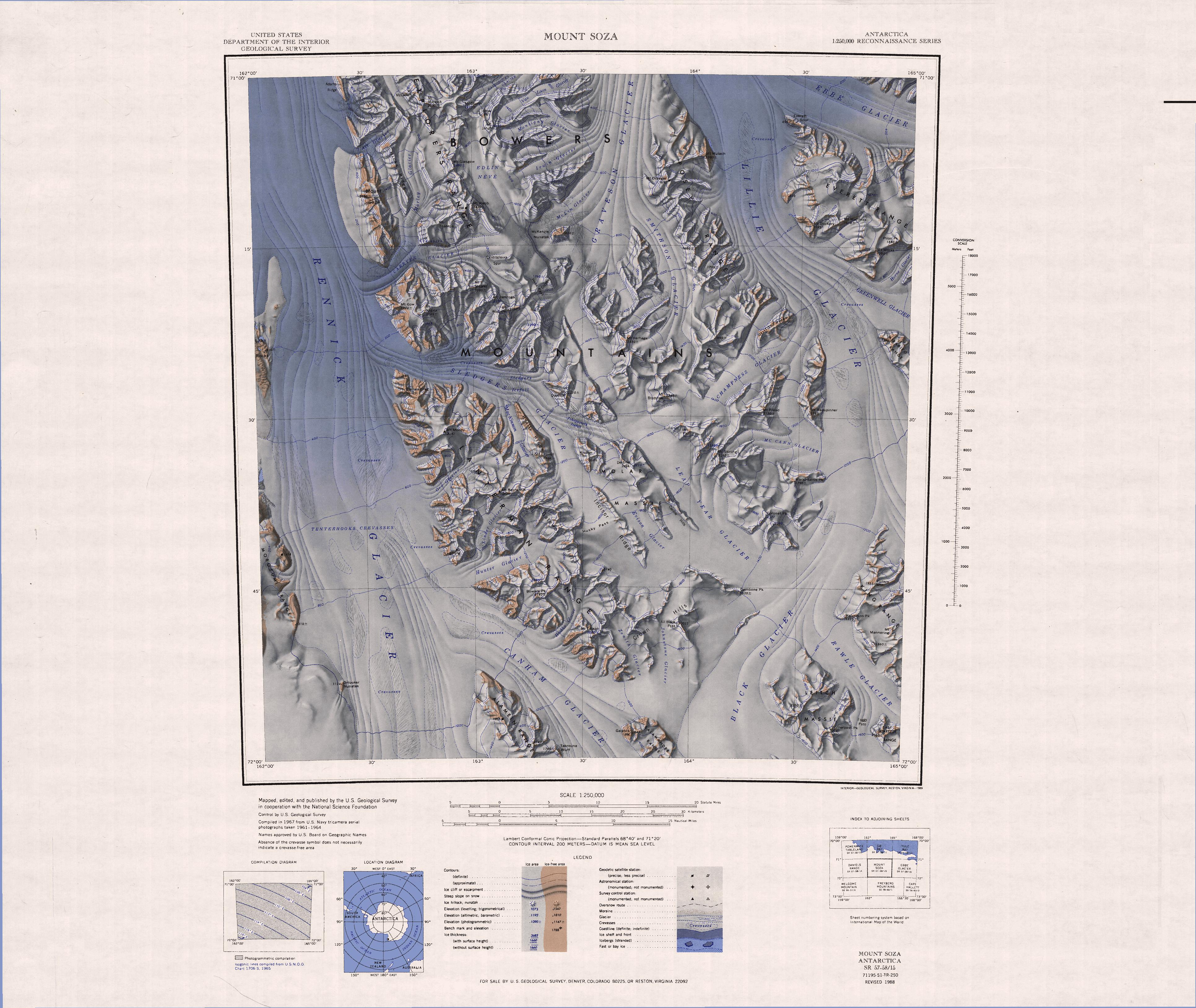
North tip of East Quartzite Range south edge of map

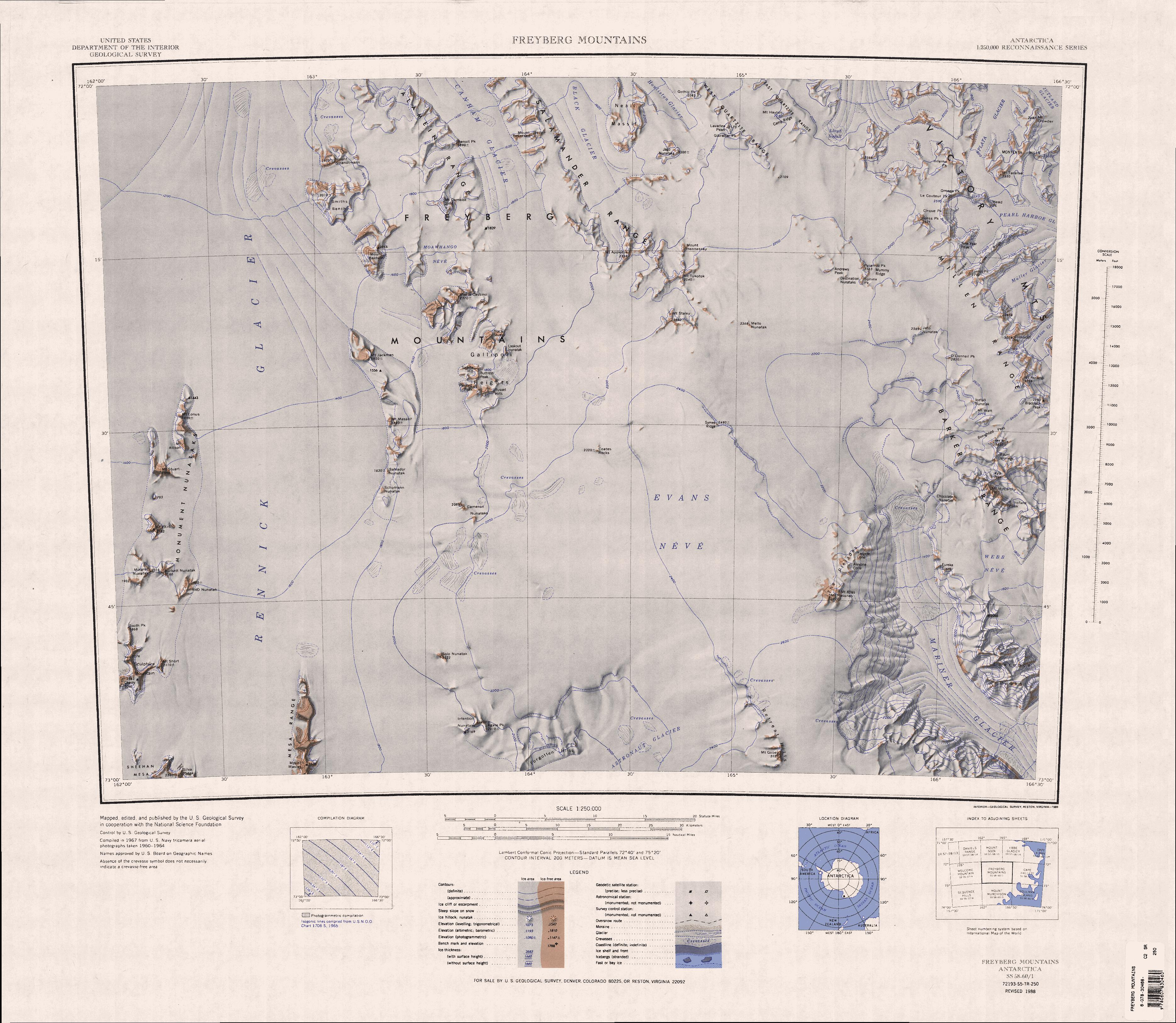
East Quartzite Range towards east of north edge of map

The northern end of the East Quartzite Range is separated from the Leitch Massif in the north of the West Quartzite Range by Foggy Pass. The head of the Rawle Glacier is to the northeast of the range. The range runs southeast parallel to the West Quartzite Range. The Lloyd Icefall is east of its southern tip. Features include Mount Hayton and Camp Ridge.

== Features ==
=== Foggy Pass ===
71°59′S 164°50′E. A pass running northeast–southwest between the Leitch Massif on the north and West Quartzite Range and East Quartzite Range on the south. (Note: The USGS description of Foggy Pass says it runs between the Leitch Massif and West Quartzite Range. However, the USGS describes the Leitch Massif as a mountain massif that forms the northern part of the West Quartzite Range.) Named by the New Zealand Antarctic Place-Names Committee (NZ-APC) in 1983 on a proposal from geologist M.G. Laird. So named from the weather conditions encountered in the area.

=== Mount Hayton ===
72°03′S 165°12′E. A peak, 2,240 metres (7,350 ft) high, in the south portion of East Quartzite Range. Named by the NZFMCAE, 1962–63, for J.S. Hayton, field assistant in the party. The peak was climbed on December 18, 1962.

=== Camp Ridge ===
72°03′S 165°12′E. A prominent ridge surmounted by Mount Hayton in the southeast part of East Quartzite Range, Concord Mountains. Named by the Northern Party of the NZFMCAE, 1962–63, after Camp IV which was established here.

== Sources ==
- Alberts, Fred G., ed. (1995), Geographic Names of the Antarctic (PDF) (2 ed.), United States Board on Geographic Names This article incorporates public domain material from websites or documents of the United States Board on Geographic Names.
- Freyberg Mountains, USGS: United States Geographic Board
- Mount Soza, USGS: United States Geographic Board

This article incorporates public domain material from websites or documents of the United States Geological Survey.
