= Manwaring =

Manwaring is a surname. Notable people with the surname include:

- Francis Macdonald Manwaring, Canadian politician
- George Manwaring (1854–1889), a hymn writer of the Church of Jesus Christ of Latter-day Saints (LDS Church)
- Hyrum Manwaring (1877–1856), American president of Ricks College in Rexburg, Idaho from 1930 to 1944.
- Kirt Manwaring (born 1965), professional baseball player
- Michael Manwaring (born 1942), American designer and artist
- Robert Manwaring, he was an English 18th century furniture designer and cabinet maker.

== See also ==
- Frances Manwaring Caulkins (1795–1869), American historian, genealogist, author
- Mainwaring, a surname
- Mannering, a surname
