= Mainwaring =

The surname Mainwaring (/ˈmænərɪŋ/ or /ˌmeɪnˈwɛərɪŋ/) is an Anglo-Norman territorial surname deriving from "Mesnil Warin" (or "Mesnilwarin", "Mesnilvarin", "Mesnil Varin"), from the village of Le Mesnil Varin (= "the manor of Warin"), now Saint-Paër, Normandy.

Notable people with the surname include:

== People ==
- Billy Mainwaring (1941–2019), Welsh international second row rugby union player who played for Aberavon RFC
- Chris Mainwaring (1965–2007), Australian rules footballer and TV presenter
- Daniel Mainwaring (1902–1977), American novelist and screenwriter
- George Mainwaring (1642–1695), English politician
- George Boulton Mainwaring (c. 1773–unknown), British politician
- George Byers Mainwaring (1824–1894), British Indian army officer and linguist
- Henry Mainwaring (1587–1653), English pirate, lawyer, author and diplomat
- John Mainwaring (1724–1807), English theologian and first biographer of the composer Georg Friedrich Händel
- Marion Mainwaring (1922–2015), American novelist
- Matty Mainwaring (b. 1990), English footballer and boxer
- Sam Mainwaring (1841–1907), Welsh socialist and syndicalist trade union activist
- William Mainwaring (1884–1971), British miner and politician
- William Mainwaring (English politician) (1735–1821), English politician, father of George Boulton Mainwaring

== In fiction ==
- Captain George Mainwaring, commander of the Home Guard platoon in the BBC sitcom Dad's Army

- Elizabeth Mainwaring, Captain Mainwaring's wife
- Barry Mainwaring, Captain Mainwaring's long-lost brother

- Veronica Mainwaring, protagonist in Demon Lover, 1929 novel by Dion Fortune

== See also ==
- Mainwaring baronets
- Mainwaring (HBC vessel), operated by the HBC from 1807 to 1820; see Hudson's Bay Company vessels
- Mannering, a surname
- Manwaring, a surname
