= Hedgpeth Heights =

Area in Antarctica

- Location within Antarctica

Geography
- Continent: Antarctica
- Region(s): Victoria Land, Antarctica
- Range coordinates: 71°7′S 167°30′E

The Hedgpeth Heights (71°7′S 167°30′E) are mainly snow-covered heights, 14 nautical miles (26 km; 16 mi) long and with peaks rising to 1,300 metres (4,300 ft), located 2 nautical miles (3.7 km; 2.3 mi) southwest of the Quam Heights in the Anare Mountains of Victoria Land, Antarctica.

== Exploration and naming ==
The Hedgpeth Heights was mapped by the United States Geological Survey (USGS) from surveys and United States Navy air photos, 1960–63, and was named by the United States Advisory Committee on Antarctic Names (US-ACAN) for Joel Hedgpeth, a United States Antarctic Research Program (USARP) biologist at McMurdo Station, 1967–68, and Palmer Station, 1968–69.

== Location ==
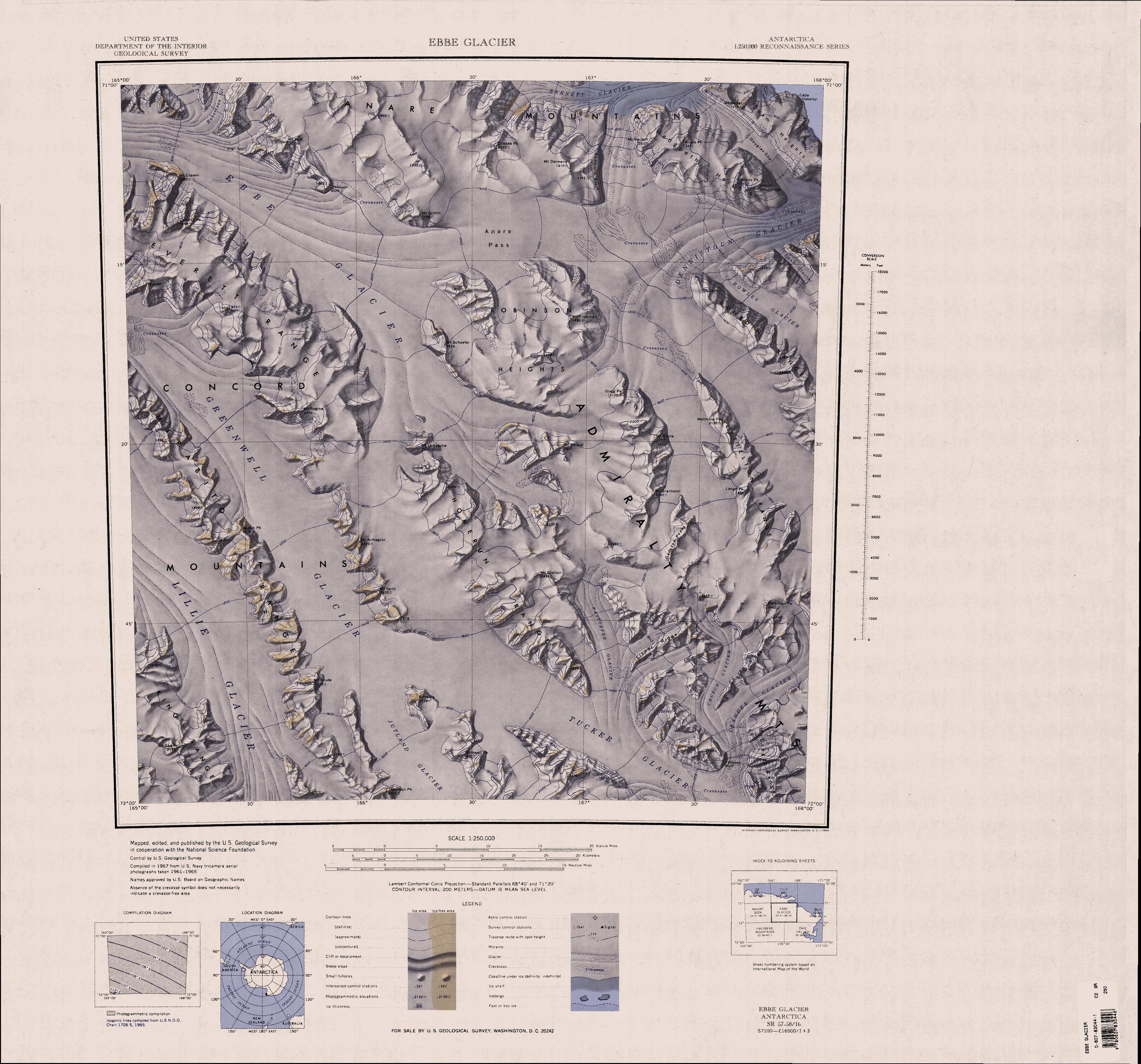
Hedgpeth Heights in northeast of map

The Hedgpeth Heights are towards the east of the Anare Mountains. The Barnett Glacier runs east along the north side, and the Dennistoun Glacier runs east along its south side. The Douglas Gap to the east connects the two glaciers and separates the Hedgpeth Heights from the Quam Heights to the east.. Features include Mount Pechell and Tanaza Peak in the north and Allowitz Peak and Mount Troubridge in the south.

== Features ==
=== Mount Pechell ===
71°05′S 167°16′E. A peak 1,360 metres (4,460 ft) high surmounting the west end of Hedgpeth Heights. Discovered and rudely mapped in January 1841 by Captain James Clark Ross, Royal Navy, who named this feature for Captain Sir Samuel John Brooke Pechell, a junior lord of the Admiralty at that time.

=== Tanaza Peak ===
71°05′S 167°24′E. A peak 1,345 metres (4,413 ft) high located 2.5 nautical miles (4.6 km; 2.9 mi) east of Mount Pechell in the west-central part of Hedgpeth Heights. Mapped by USGS from surveys and United States Navy air photos, 1960–63. Named by US-ACAN for Richard R. Tenaza, USARP biologist at Hallett Station, 1967–68.

=== Allowitz Peak ===
71°08′S 167°39′E. A peak 1,240 metres (4,070 ft) high rising immediately west of Mount Troubridge. Mapped by USGS from surveys and United States Navy air photos, 1960–63. Named by US-ACAN for Ronald D. Allowitz, United States ArmyRP biologist at Hallett Station, 1962–63.

=== Mount Troubridge ===
71°08′S 167°44′E. A mountain over 1,000 metres (3,300 ft) high, surmounting the east end of Hedgpeth Heights. Discovered and rudely charted in January 1841 by Captain James Ross, RN, who named it for Rear Admiral Sir Edward Thomas Troubridge, one of the junior lords of the Admiralty at that time.

== Sources ==
- Alberts, Fred G., ed. (1995), Geographic Names of the Antarctic (PDF) (2 ed.), United States Board on Geographic Names This article incorporates public domain material from websites or documents of the United States Board on Geographic Names.
- Ebbe Glacier, USGS: United States Geographic Board

This article incorporates public domain material from websites or documents of the United States Geological Survey.
