= Manring =

Manring is a surname. Notable people with the surname include:

- Charles Manring (born 1929), American rower
- Michael Manring (born 1960), American bass guitarist

== See also ==
- Mannering
