= Quam Heights =

Mountain in Victoria Land, Antarctica

- Location within Antarctica

Geography
- Continent: Antarctica
- Region(s): Victoria Land, Antarctica
- Range coordinates: 71°3′S 167°48′E

Quam Heights (71°3′S 167°48′E) is a mostly snow-covered heights, 15 nautical miles (28 km; 17 mi) long and 4 nautical miles (7.4 km; 4.6 mi) wide, rising over 1,000 metres (3,300 ft) and forming the coastline between the Barnett Glacier and Dennistoun Glacier in northern Victoria Land, Antarctica.

== Exploration and naming ==
The Quam Heights were mapped by United States Geological Survey (USGS) from surveys and United States Navy aerial photography, 1960–63. The site was named by the United States Advisory Committee on Antarctic Names (US-ACAN) for Louis O. Quam, chief scientist of the National Science Foundation's Office of Polar Programs, 1967–72.

== Location ==
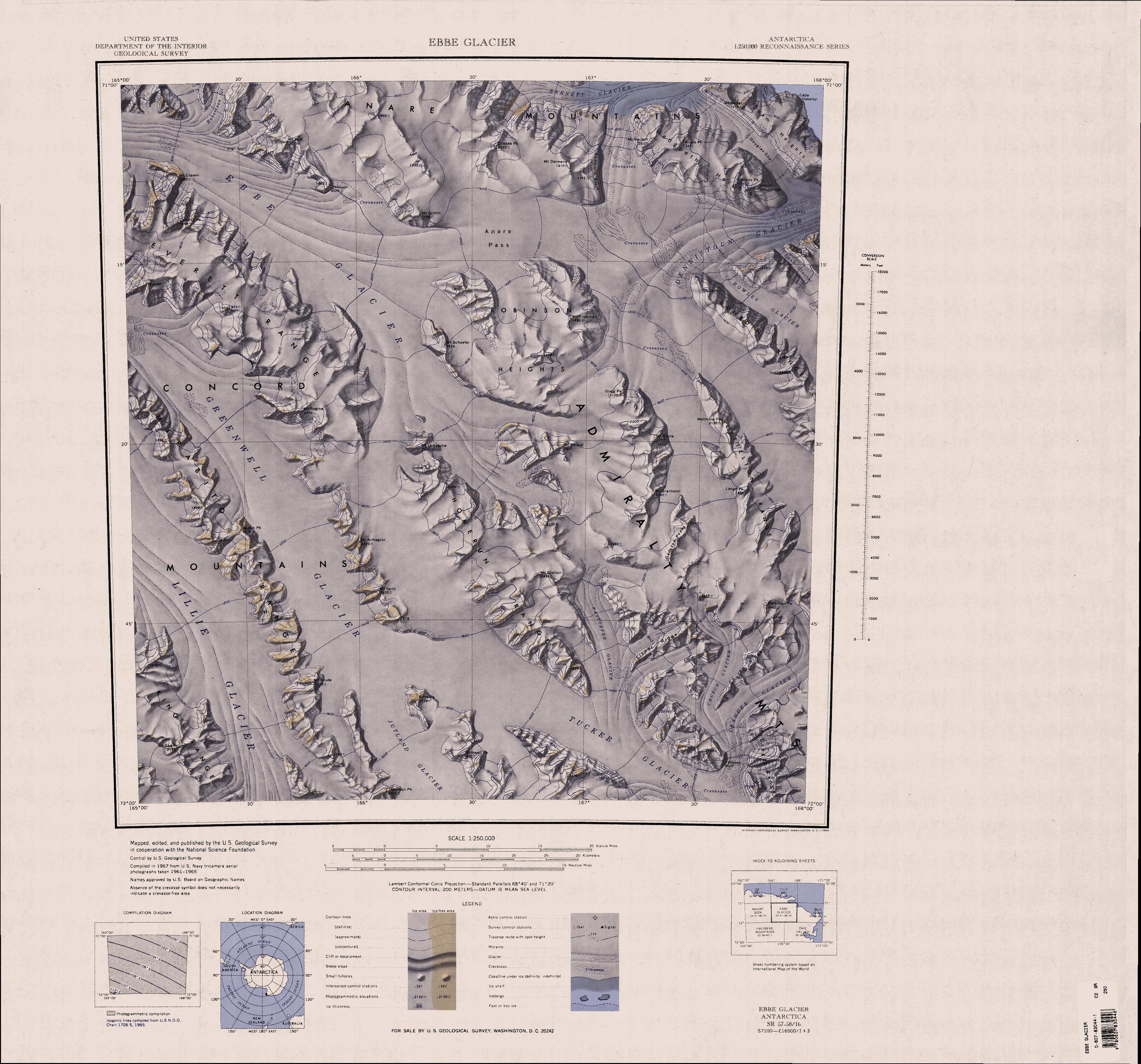
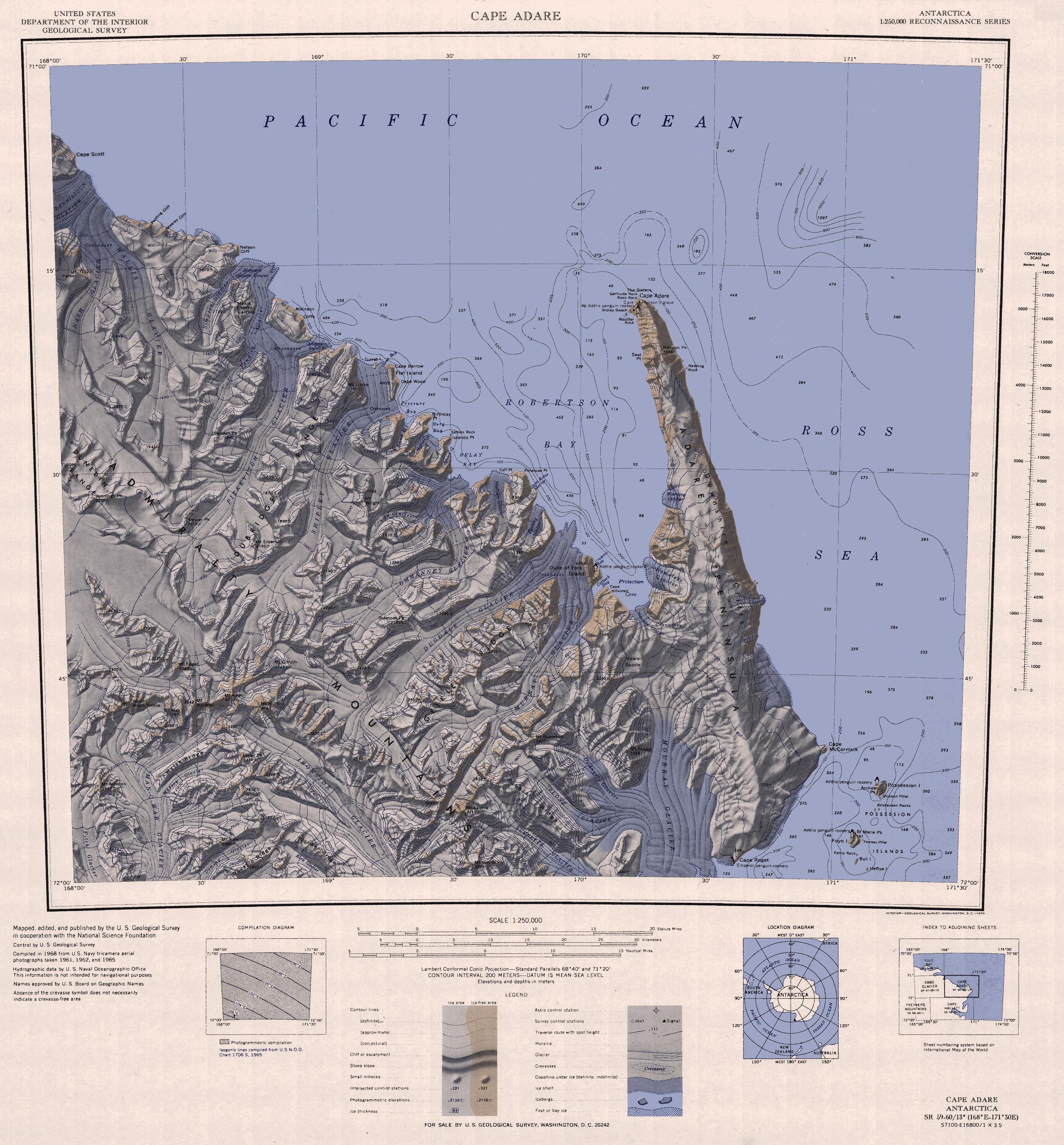
Quam Heights in extreme northeast of left map, extreme northwest of right map

Quam Heights is in the extreme east of the Anare Mountains, to the south of Barnett Glacier and Smith Inlet. It is separated by the Douglas Gap from the Hedgpeth Heights to the east. The Dennistoun Glacier flows east to the Pacific Ocean along its southern flank. Features include Mount Neder on the west side, and Cape Oakley and Cape Scott on the coast.

== Features ==
=== Mount Neder ===
71°02′S 167°40′E. Mountain with a small, pointed summit 1,010 metres (3,310 ft) high that surmounts the northwest part of Quam Heights. Mapped by USGS from surveys and United States Navy air photos, 1960-63. Named by US-ACAN for Irving R. Neder, United States ArmyRP geologist in the Ohio Range and Wisconsin Range area, 1965-66, and McMurdo Sound area, 1966-67.

=== Cape Oakeley ===
71°01′S 167°54′E. Bold headland on the northeast side of Quam Heights. It forms the south side of the entrance of Smith Inlet. Discovered in 1841 by Captain James Ross, RN, who named it for Henry Oakeley, mate on the Erebus.

=== Cape Scott ===
71°07′S 168°05′E. A cape at the west side of the terminus of Dennistoun Glacier. Discovered by Captain James Ross, 1841, who named it for Peter A. Scott, Mate on the Terror.

== Sources ==
- Alberts, Fred G., ed. (1995), Geographic Names of the Antarctic (PDF) (2 ed.), United States Board on Geographic Names This article incorporates public domain material from websites or documents of the United States Board on Geographic Names.
- Cape Adare, USGS: United States Geographic Board
- Ebbe Glacier, USGS: United States Geographic Board

This article incorporates public domain material from websites or documents of the United States Geological Survey.
