= Barnett Glacier =

Glacier in Antarctica

- Location within Antarctica
- Location: Victoria Land
- Coordinates: 70°59′S 167°30′E
- Thickness: unknown
- Terminus: Smith Inlet
- Status: unknown

Barnett Glacier (70°59′S 167°30′E) is a large glacier in the Anare Mountains that flows east along the south side of Tapsell Foreland into Smith Inlet, northern Victoria Land, Antarctica.

== Exploration and naming ==
Barnett Glacier was mapped by the United States Geological Survey (USGS) from surveys and from United States Navy air photos, 1960–63. It was named by the United States Advisory Committee on Antarctic Names (US-ACAN) after Donald C. Barnett, USGS topographic engineer, a member of USGS Topo East and West, 1962–63, in which the expedition extended geodetic control from the area of Cape Hallett to the Wilson Hills (Topo West) and from the foot of Beardmore Glacier through the Horlick Mountains (Topo East).

== Location ==
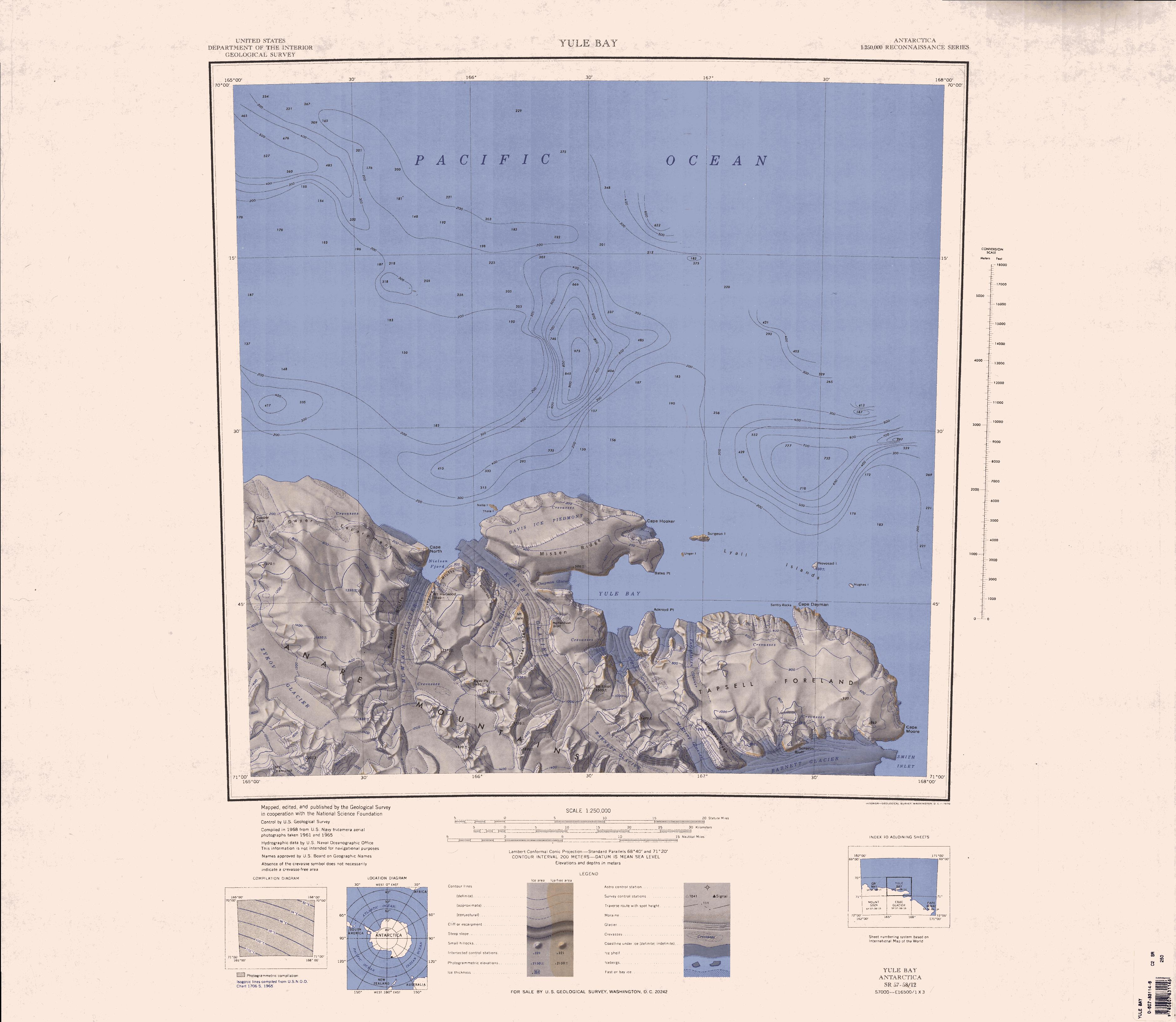
Barnett Glacier in southeast of map

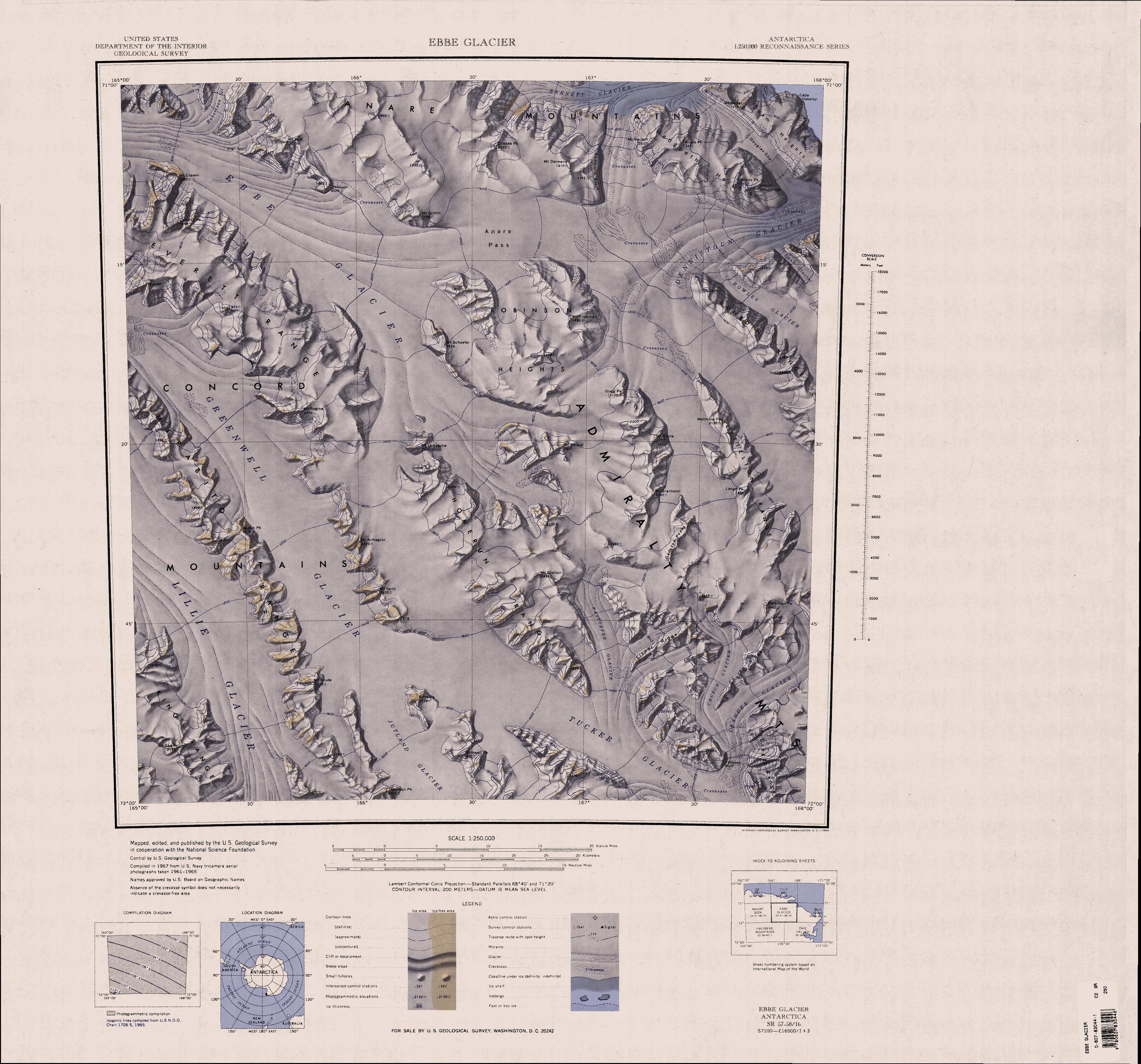
Barnett Glacier in northeast of map

Barnett Glacier rises in the Anare Mountains to the northeast of Drabek Peak, and flows east. It passes Mount Dalmeny, Hedgpeth Heights, the Douglas Gap and Quam Heights to the south. It is fed by McElroy Glacier from Tapsell Foreland to the north, and flows past the south of the foreland to terminate in Smith Inlet to the south of Cape Moore.

== Features ==
=== Douglas Gap ===
71°05′S 167°44′E. A glacier-filled gap, 1.5 nautical miles (2.8 km; 1.7 mi) wide, between Hedgpeth Heights and Quam Heights. Mapped by USGS from surveys and United States Navy air photos, 1960-63. Named by US-ACAN for Donald S. Douglas, United States ArmyRP biologist at Hallett Station, 1959-60 and 1960-61.

=== McElroy Glacier ===
70°58′S 166°58′E. A tributary glacier just west of Matthews Ridge on Tapsell Foreland. It drains south to join Barnett Glacier. It was mapped by USGS from surveys and United States Navy air photos, 1960-63. It was named by US-ACAN for Clifford T. McElroy, United States ArmyRP geologist at McMurdo Station, 1964-65 and 1966-67.

=== Smith Inlet ===
70°59′S 167°52′E. A bay, 4 nautical miles (7.4 km; 4.6 mi) wide, partially filled with the ice tongue of Barnett Glacier. Located between Cape Moore and Cape Oakeley along the coast of north Victoria Land. Discovered by Captain James Clark Ross, 1841, who named it for Alexander J. Smith, mate on the Erebus.

== Sources ==
- Alberts, Fred G., ed. (1995), Geographic Names of the Antarctic (PDF) (2 ed.), United States Board on Geographic Names This article incorporates public domain material from websites or documents of the United States Board on Geographic Names.
- Ebbe Glacier, USGS: United States Geographic Board
- Yule Bay, USGS: United States Geographic Board

This article incorporates public domain material from websites or documents of the United States Geological Survey.
