= Anare Mountains =

Mountain range in Victoria Land, Antarctica

- Location within Antarctica

Geography
- Continent: Antarctica
- Region(s): Victoria Land, Antarctica
- Range coordinates: 70°55′S 166°00′E

The Anare Mountains (70°55′S 166°00′E) are a large group of mainly snow-covered peaks and ridges along the northern coast of Victoria Land, Antarctica. The group is bounded on the north and east by the Pacific Ocean, on the west by Lillie Glacier, and on the south by Ebbe Glacier and Dennistoun Glacier. They are north of the Concord Mountains and east of the Bowers Mountains.

== Exploration and naming ==
Mountains in this area were first sighted by Captain James Clark Ross in 1841. They were photographed during United States Navy Operation Highjump (1946–1947) and were surveyed by United States Geological Survey (USGS) helicopter teams, 1962–63. The Anare Mountains were named by the northern party of the New Zealand Geological Survey Antarctic Expedition, 1963–64, for the Australian National Antarctic Research Expeditions (ANARE), 1962, under Phillip Law, which performed survey work along the coast.

== Location ==
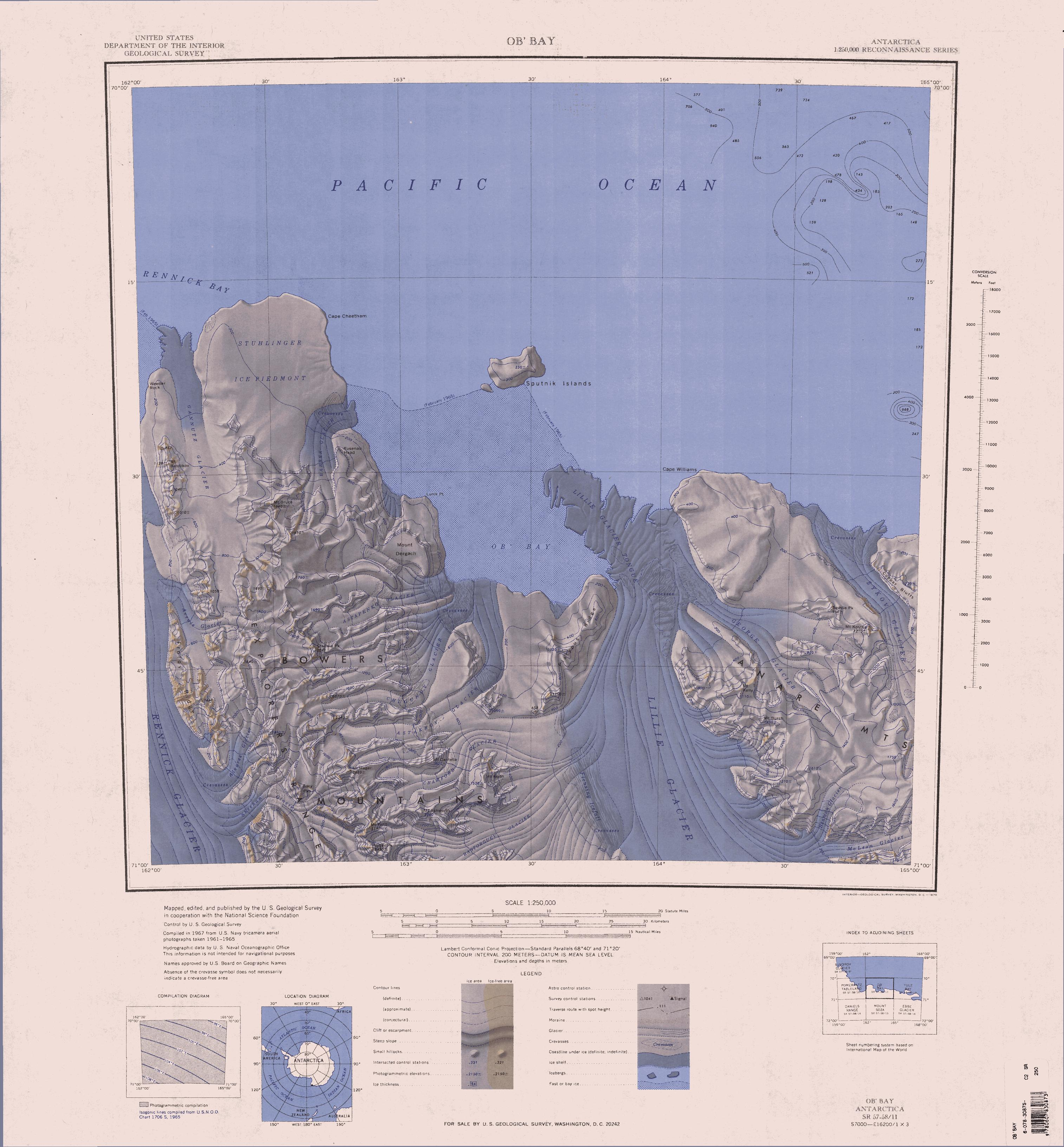
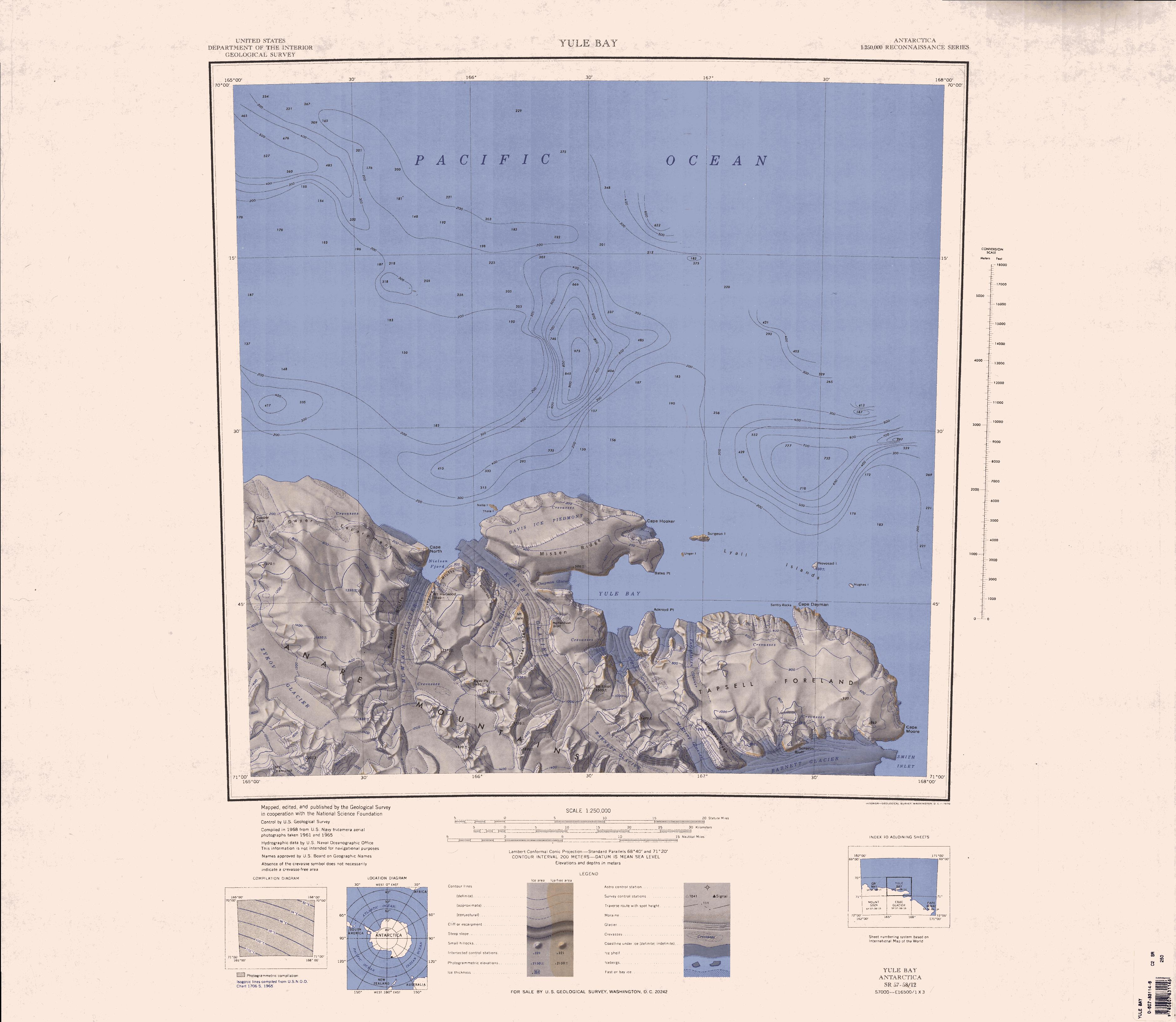

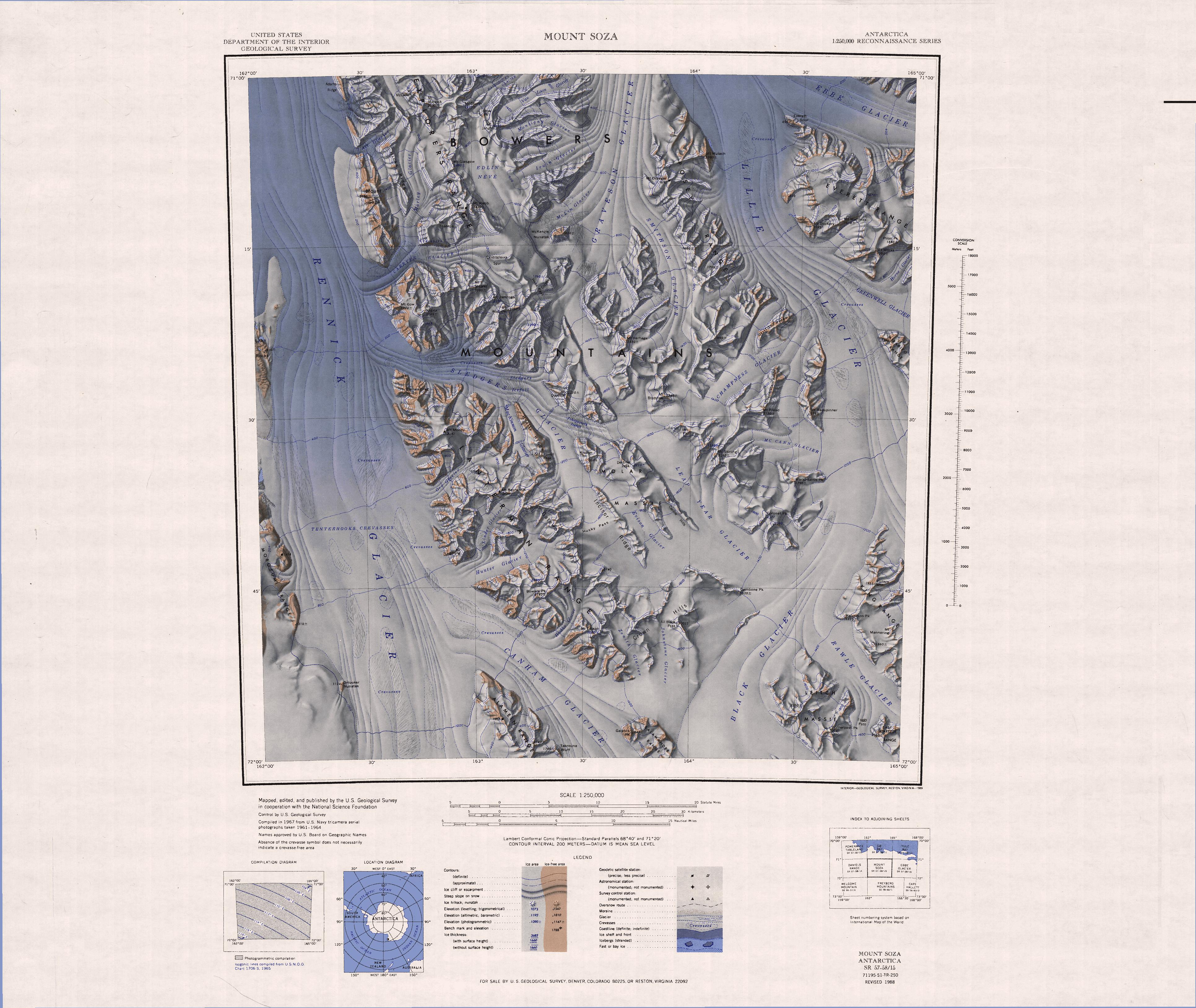
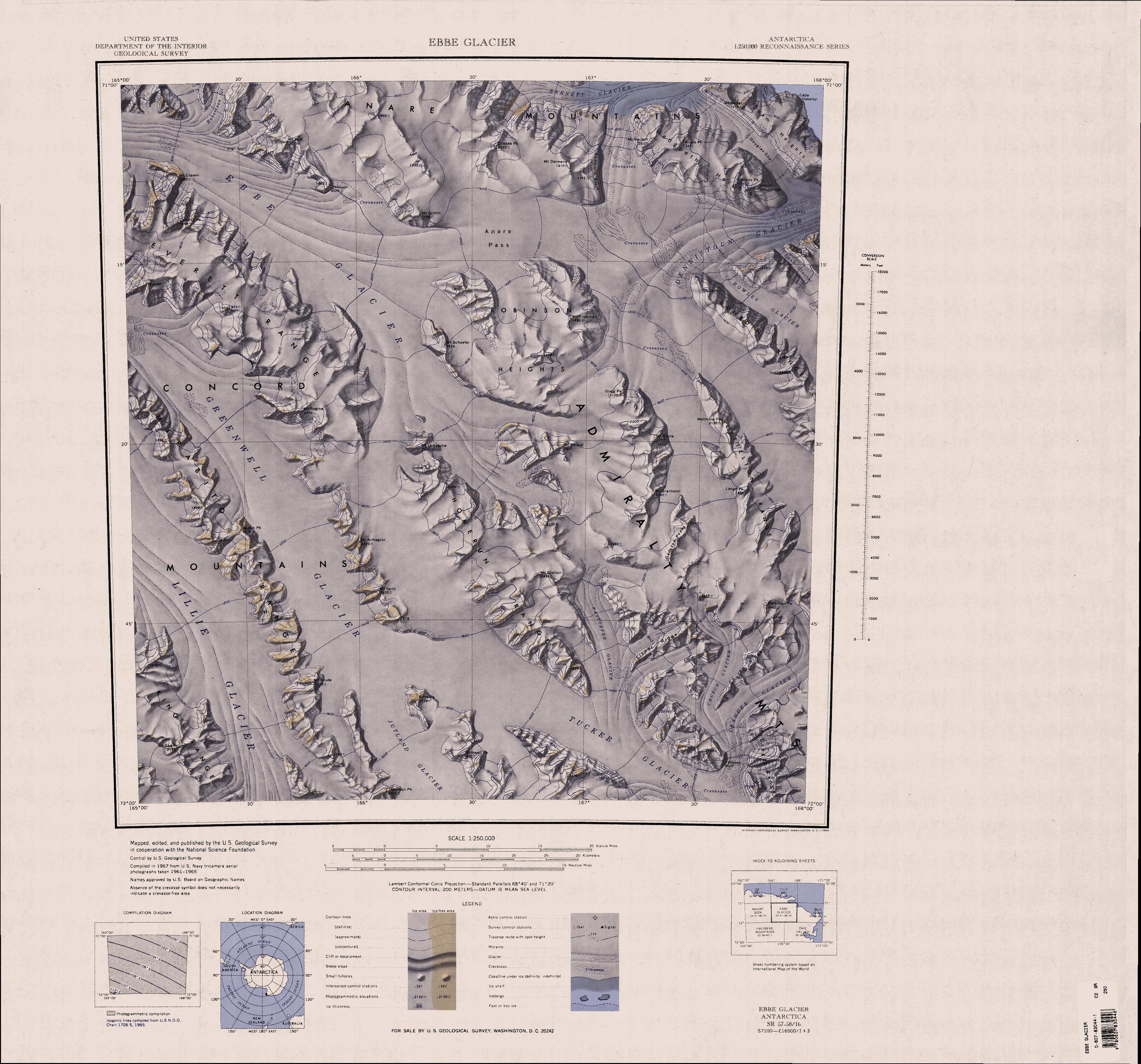
Anare Mountains extend along the coast east of Lillie Glacier in upper maps, southern part in north of lower maps

In the northwest the Anare Mountains extend along the Pacific coast to the east of Ob' Bay and the Lillie Glacier. Zykov Glacier flows north through the mountains to the Pacific. George Glacier, Beaman Glacier and McLean Glacier flow east into Lillie Glacier. In the southwest, the Ebbe Glacier flows west into Lillie Glacier and defines the southern boundary of the Anare Mountains. The Everett Range lies to the south.

Further east, McMahon Glacier and Kirkby Glacier flow north to the Pacific to the west of the Davis Ice Piedmont and Yule Bay. The O'Hara Glacier and Fortenberry Glacier flow into Yule Bay to the east of Tapsell Foreland. The Barnett Glacier flows east from the mountains into Smith Inlet at the eastern edge of the mountains. In the southeast, Robertson Glacier flows south to join Ebbe Glacier. Anare Pass lies between Ebbe Glacier and Dennistoun Glacier, which defines the southeast boundary of the mountains. South of the mountains are the Everett Range, Robinson Heights and Dunedin Range in the Admiralty Mountains.

== Northern features ==
Features of the northwest section include Cape Williams and Cooper Bluffs on the coast, Saddle Peak and Mount Kostka in the Buell Peninsula to the west of Zykov Glacier, Mount Kelly and Mount Burch between George Glacier and Lillie Glacier. Features of the northeast section include Cooper Spur, the Dwyer Escarpment, Cape North, Nielsen Fjord, Gregory Bluffs, Davis Ice Piedmont, Yule Bay and Tapsell Foreland along the coast, Buskirk Bluffs, Mount Harwood, Tiger Peak and Mount Elliot further inland.

=== Mount Kelly ===
70°47′S 164°19′E. Prominent peak 1,110 metres (3,640 ft) high located 3 nautical miles (5.6 km; 3.5 mi) northwest of Mount Burch in western Anare Mountains. Named by ANARE for Second Lieutenant R.M. Kelly, officer in charge of the army amphibious motor vehicle detachment with ANARE (Thala Dan) 1962, led by Phillip Law, which explored the area.

=== Mount Burch ===
70°49′S 164°25′E. A peak 1,400 metres (4,600 ft) high about 3 nautical miles (5.6 km; 3.5 mi) southeast of Mount Kelly on the south side of George Glacier, in the Anare Mountains. Named by ANARE for W.M. Burch, geophysicist with the ANARE (Thala Dan), 1962, led by Phillip Law, which explored the area.

=== Mount Hemphill ===
70°59′S 165°06′E. A snow-covered mountain that rises above 1,800 metres (5,900 ft) high in the south part of Anare Mountains. It stands between the head of McLean Glacier and Ebbe Glacier. Mapped by the United States Geological Survey (USGS) from surveys and United States Navy air photos, 1960-63. Named by the United States Advisory Committee on Antarctic Names (US-ACAN) for Lieutenant (j.g.) Harold S. Hemphill, United States Navy, photographic officer with Squadron VX-6 in Antarctica, 1962-63 and 1963-64.

=== Springtail Bluff ===
71°02′S 165°12′E. The steep, south-facing bluff that borders the eastern half of Mount Hemphill. So named by the northern party of New Zealand Geological Survey Antarctic Expedition (NZGSAE), 1963-64, for the find of small insects (Collembola) in this location.

=== Dwyer Escarpment ===
70°38′S 165°24′E. Ice-covered escarpment that overlooks the north coast of Victoria Land between Cooper Spur and Cape North. Mapped by ANARE, 1962, which gave the name after L.J. Dwyer, former Director of the Australian Commonwealth Bureau of Meteorology, a member of the AN ARE Executive Planning Committee.

=== Mount Harwood ===
70°44′S 165°49′E. A peak 1,040 metres (3,410 ft) high which surmounts Gregory Bluffs on the north coast. Named by ANARE for T.R. Harwood, second-incharge of the ANARE cruise (Thala Dan), 1962, which explored this area.

=== Tiger Peak ===
70°52′S 165°58′E. A peak, 1,490 metres (4,890 ft) high, standing above the cirque wall near the head of Ludvig Glacier in the central Anare Mountains. The feature is distinguished by stripes of different colored rock; hence the name, applied by the ANARE (Thala Dan), 1962, which explored this area.

=== Mount Elliot ===
70°53′S 166°32′E. A mountain 1,500 metres (4,900 ft) high rising between Kirkby Glacier and O'Hara Glacier, about 5 nautical miles (9.3 km; 5.8 mi) south of Yule Bay, in the Anare Mountains, Victoria Land. A mountain in this approximate position was sighted by Captain James Clark Ross, Royal Navy, in February 1841, who named it for Rear Admiral George Elliot, Commander-in-Chief in the Cape of Good Hope Station.

== Southern features ==
Features of the southern section include Mount Bolt, Peterson Bluff and Mount Griffin along the Ebbe Glacier; Drabek Peak, Mount Dalmeny and Redmond Bluff north of the Anare Pass, Hedgpeth Heights and Quam Heights above the Dennistoun Glacier.

=== Mount Bolt ===
71°05′S 165°43′E. A mountain 2,010 metres (6,590 ft) high rising on the north side of Ebbe Glacier and 5 nautical miles (9.3 km; 5.8 mi) northwest of Peterson Bluff. Mapped by USGS from surveys and United States Navy air photos, 1960-63. Named by US-ACAN for Lieutenant Ronald L. Bolt, United States Navy, pilot of R4D aircraft in the support of the USGS Topo West survey of this area in the 1962–63 season. He also worked the previous austral summer season in Antarctica.

=== Vigil Spur ===
71°06′S 165°30′E. A spur which borders Ebbe Glacier and forms the southwest extremity of Mount Bolt. So named by the northern party of NZGSAE, 1963-64, because it spent a prolonged period of time here due to blizzard conditions which prevented travel.

=== Peterson Bluff ===
71°09′S 165°53′E. A prominent bluff 1,480 metres (4,860 ft) high on the north side of Ebbe Glacier. The feature forms the southeast end of the broad ridge descending from Mount Bolt. Mapped by USGS from surveys and United States Navy aerial photography, 1960-63. Named by US-ACAN for Donald C. Peterson, photographer's mate with United States Navy Squadron VX-6 at McMurdo Station, 1967-68 and 1968-69.

=== Mount Griffin ===
71°11′S 166°16′E. A mountain 1,760 metres (5,770 ft) high which stands 13 nautical miles (24 km; 15 mi) east-southeast of Mount Bolt and marks the south limit of the Anare Mountains. Mapped by USGS from surveys and United States Navy air photos, 1960-63. Named by US-ACAN for Chief Warrant Officer Joe R. Griffin, United States Army, helicopter pilot in support of the USGS Topo East and Topo West expeditions, 1962-63, which included a survey of this mountain.

=== Drabek Peak ===
71°05′S 166°37′E. A peak 2,090 metres (6,860 ft) high 6 nautical miles (11 km; 6.9 mi) north of Anare Pass and 9 nautical miles (17 km; 10 mi) west of Redmond Bluff. Mapped by USGS from surveys and United States Navy aerial photographs, 1960-63. Named by US-ACAN for Charles M. Drabek, United States ArmyRP biologist at McMurdo Station, 1964-65 and 1967-68.

=== Mount Dalmeny ===
71°07′S 166°55′E. A peak 1,610 metres (5,280 ft) high 6 nautical miles (11 km; 6.9 mi) east-southeast of Drabek Peak and 3 nautical miles (5.6 km; 3.5 mi) west of Redmond Bluff. Discovered in 1841 by Captain James Ross, RN, who named it for the Right Honorable Lord Dalmeny, then a junior lord of the Admiralty.

=== Redmond Bluff ===
71°08′S 167°03′E. An abrupt east-facing bluff 1,200 metres (3,900 ft) high standing 2.5 nautical miles (4.6 km; 2.9 mi) east of Mount Dalmeny. Mapped by USGS from surveys and United States Navy aerial photography, 1960-63. Named by US-ACAN for James R. Redmond, United States ArmyRP biologist at McMurdo Station, 1967-68.

=== Anare Pass ===
71°13′S 166°37′E. A broad ice-covered pass at 1,200 metres (3,900 ft) high above sea level. The pass is the highest point on the glaciers that delimit the south side of Anare Mountains, separating the latter from the Admiralty Mountains and Concord Mountains to the south. Mapped by USGS from surveys and United States Navy air photos, 1960-63. Named by US-ACAN in association with Anare Mountains.

== Sources ==
- Alberts, Fred G., ed. (1995), Geographic Names of the Antarctic (PDF) (2 ed.), United States Board on Geographic Names This article incorporates public domain material from websites or documents of the United States Board on Geographic Names.
- Ebbe Glacier, USGS: United States Geographic Board
- Mount Soza, USGS: United States Geographic Board
- Ob' Bay, USGS: United States Geographic Board
- Yule Bay, USGS: United States Geographic Board

This article incorporates public domain material from websites or documents of the United States Geological Survey.
