= Robert Manwaring =

Robert Manwaring was an English 18th-century furniture designer and cabinet maker. The dates of his birth and death are unknown.

== Biography ==
He was a contemporary and imitator of Thomas Chippendale, and not the least considerable of his rivals. He prided himself upon work which he described as "genteel", and his speciality was chairs. He was in business in the late 18th century at the Haymarket in London.

He manifests the same surprising variations of quality that are noticed in the work of nearly all the English cabinet-makers of the second half of the 18th century, and while his best had an undeniable elegance, his worst was terrible: squat, ill-proportioned and confusing. Some of his chairbacks are so nearly identical with Chippendale's that it is difficult to suppose that the one did not copy from the other, and most of the designs of the greater man enjoyed priority of date. During a portion of his career, Manwaring was a devotee of the Chinese taste; he likewise practised in the Gothic Revival manner. He appears to have introduced the small bracket between the front rail of the seat and the top of the chair leg, or at all events to have made such constant use of it, that it has come to be regarded as characteristic of his work. Manwaring described certain products of his own work as "elegant and superb", and as possessing "grandeur and magnificence". He did not confine himself to furniture but produced many designs for rustic gates and railings, often very extravagant. One of his most absurd rural chairs has rock-work with a waterfall in the back.

Among Manwaring's writings were The Cabinet and Chair Makers' Real Friend and Companion, or the Whole System of Chairmaking Made Plain and Easy (1765); The Carpenters' Compleat Guide to Gothic Railing (1765); and The Chair-makers' Guide (1766).
