= McMahon Glacier =

Glacier in Victoria Land, Antarctica

- Location within Antarctica
- Type: Outlet glacier
- Location: East Antarctica
- Coordinates: 70°45′S 165°45′E
- Terminus: Southern Ocean

McMahon Glacier (70°45′S 165°45′E) is a glacier about 18 nautical miles (33 km; 21 mi) long in the Anare Mountains of Victoria Land, Antarctica. It drains north between the Buskirk Bluffs and Gregory Bluffs into Nielsen Fjord.

== Name ==
The McMahon Glacier was named by the Antarctic Names Committee of Australia (ANCA) for F.P. McMahon, Logistics Officer with the Australian Antarctic Division, who led a number of expeditions to Macquarie Island and was second-in-charge of several expeditions to Antarctica.

== Location ==
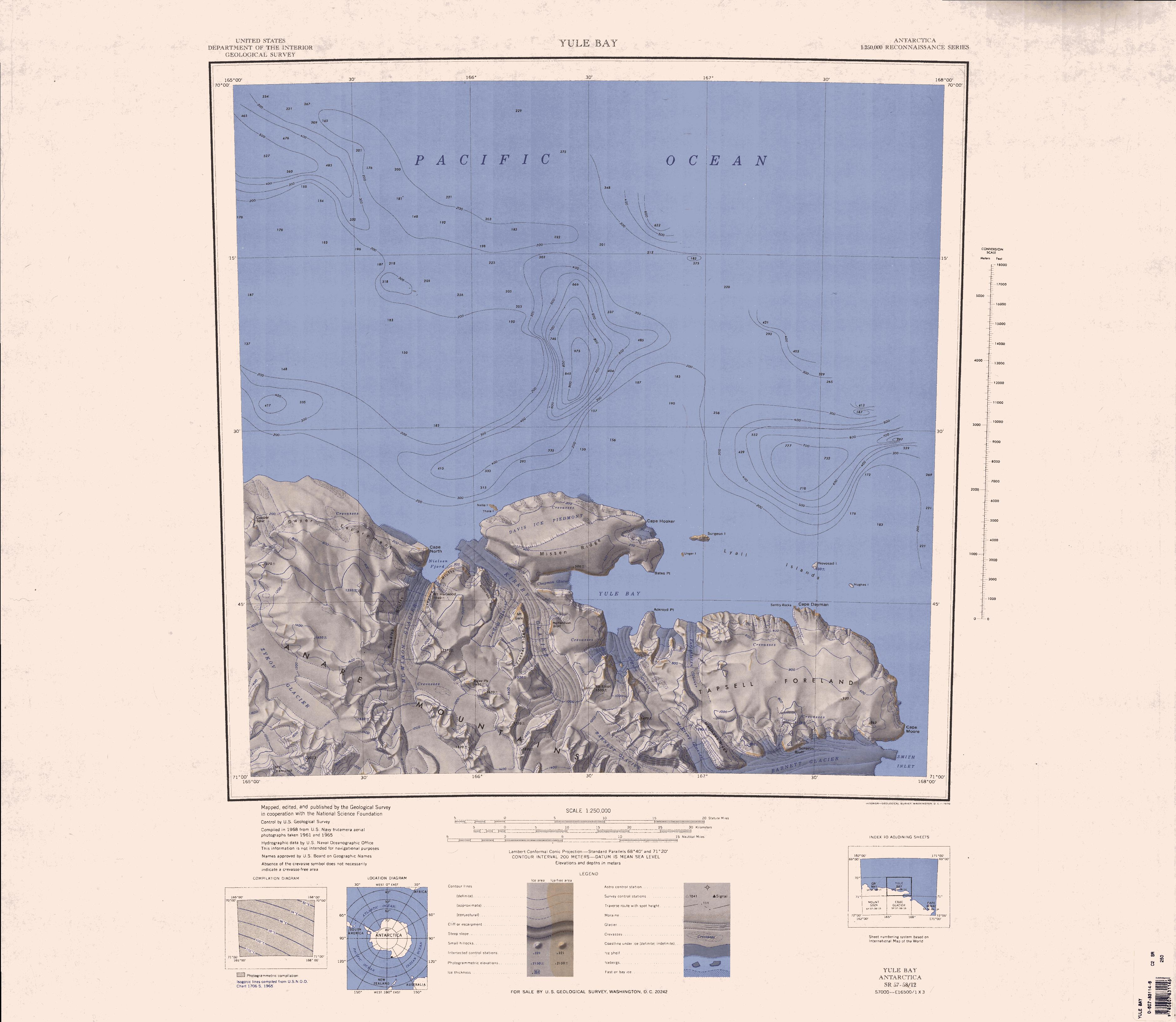
McMahon Glacier towards the west on the coast

The McMahon Glacier forms in the Anare Mountains to the west of Tiger Peak and flows north past Buskirk Bluffs to the west and Gregory Bluffs to the east to enter the Nielsen Fjord, which leads to the Pacific Ocean. Cape North is at the west of the fjord's mouth, and the mouth of the Kirkby Glacier is at the east.

== Features ==
=== Buskirk Bluffs ===
70°47′S 165°39′E. A sheer rock bluff on the west side of McMahon Glacier. Named by the Australian National Antarctic Research Expedition (ANARE) for Maj. H. Buskirk, United States Air Force, official American observer with ANARE (Thala Dan), 1962, which explored this area.

=== Gregory Bluffs ===
70°44′S 165°49′E. High granite bluffs that form the east side of Nielsen Fjord. Named by ANARE for C. Gregory, geologist with the AN ARE (Thala Dan) cruise. Pilot John Stanwix, with Gregory and party leader Phillip Law, landed a helicopter at the foot of these bluffs to examine them, February 12, 1962.

=== Nielsen Fjord ===
70°42′S 165°50′E. A fjord 2 nautical miles (3.7 km; 2.3 mi) wide between Cape North and Gregory Bluffs. Named by ANARE for Captain Hans Nielsen, master of the M.V. Thala Dan used in exploring this coast, 1962.

=== Cape North ===
70°41′S 165°48′E. A large bluff with much rock exposed along the north and east sides, standing at the west side of Nielsen Fjord. The top of the bluff is snow covered and rises to about 500 metres (1,600 ft). Although it is not the northernmost coastal point in the immediate area, the feature is conspicuous and presumably is the one observed by Captain James Clark Ross in 1841 and given the name Cape North. On the chart by Ross, Cape North is depicted as the northernmost cape observed westward of Cape Hooker.

== Sources ==
- Alberts, Fred G., ed. (1995), Geographic Names of the Antarctic (PDF) (2 ed.), United States Board on Geographic Names This article incorporates public domain material from websites or documents of the United States Board on Geographic Names.
- Yule Bay, USGS: United States Geographic Board

This article incorporates public domain material from websites or documents of the United States Geological Survey.
