= Buell Peninsula =

Peninsula in Antarctica

- Location within Antarctica

Geography
- Location: Pacific Ocean
- Coordinates: 70°36′S 164°24′E

The Buell Peninsula (70°36′S 164°24′E) is an ice-covered peninsula terminating in Cape Williams, located between the lower ends of Lillie Glacier, George Glacier and Zykov Glacier, at the northwest end of the Anare Mountains in Antarctica. The peninsula is 15 nautical miles (28 km; 17 mi) long and 8 nautical miles (15 km; 9.2 mi) at its greatest width.

== Exploration and naming ==
The Buell Peninsula was photographed from United States Navy aircraft during Operation Highjump, 1946–47, and again in 1960–62. It was mapped by the United States Geological Survey (USGS) in 1962–63, and named by the United States Advisory Committee on Antarctic Names (US-ACAN) for Lieutenant (later Lieutenant Commander) Kenneth R. Buell, a U.S. Navy navigator on aircraft with Squadron VX-6 in Antarctica in 1965–66 and 1966–67.

== Location ==
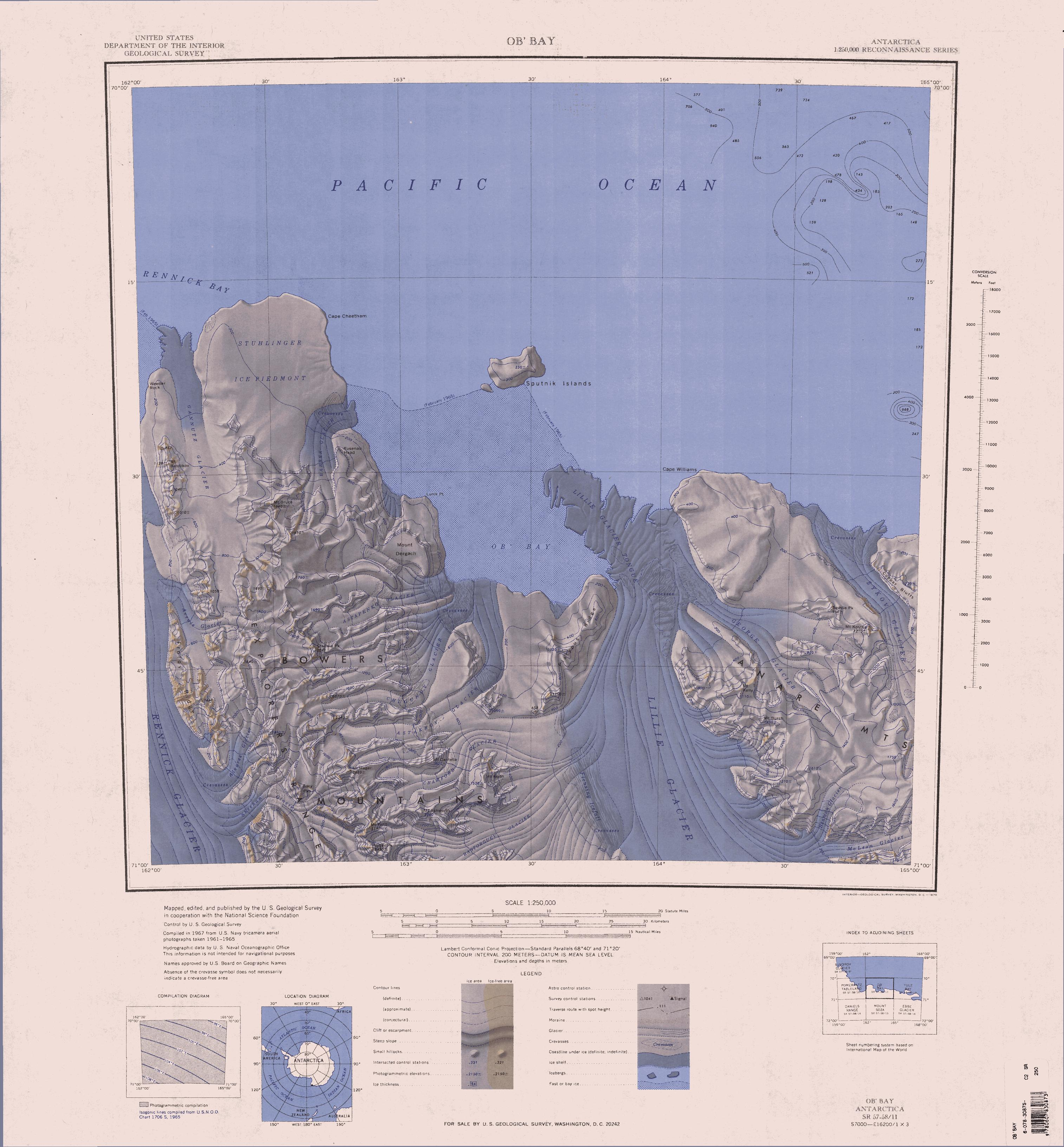
Buell Peninsula (not named) and Cape Williams in east of map.

The Buell Peninsula extends northward into the Pacific Ocean from the Anare Mountains between Zykov Glacier to the east, George Glacier to the southwest and the Lillie Glacier Tongue to the west. Features include Cape Williams in the north, and Saddle Peak and Mount Kostka on the neck of the peninsula to the south.

== Features ==
=== Cape Williams ===
70°30′S 164°09′E. An ice-covered cape at the east side of the terminus of Lillie Glacier. Discovered in February 1911 when the Terra Nova of the British Antarctic Expedition, 1910–1913, explored the area westward of Cape North. Named for William Williams, Chief Engine-room Artificer on the Terra Nova.

=== Saddle Peak ===
70°40′S 164°40′E. Twin peaks 960 metres (3,150 ft) high with a distinct saddle between them, located 3 nautical miles (5.6 km; 3.5 mi) northwest of Mount Kostka. Given this descriptive name by Australian National Antarctic Research Expedition (ANARE) (Thala Dan), 1962, which explored this area.

=== Mount Kostka ===
70°42′S 164°49′E. Mountain 1,210 metres (3,970 ft) high on the west side of Zykov Glacier, 3 nautical miles (5.6 km; 3.5 mi) southeast of Saddle Peak. Photographed from the air by United States Navy Operation Highjump, 1946–1947. Surveyed by the Soviet Antarctic Expedition in 1958 and named after Czechoslovak aerologist O. Kostka, a member of the Soviet Antarctic Expedition, 1959–1961, who perished in a fire at Mirnyy Station on August 3, 1960.

== Sources ==
- Alberts, Fred G., ed. (1995), Geographic Names of the Antarctic (PDF) (2 ed.), United States Board on Geographic Names This article incorporates public domain material from websites or documents of the United States Board on Geographic Names.
- Ob' Bay, USGS: United States Geographic Board

This article incorporates public domain material from websites or documents of the United States Geological Survey.
