= King Range (Antarctica) =

Mountain range in Antarctica

King Range (71°52′S 165°03′E) is a mountain range, 22 km (14 mi) long and 8 km (5 mi) wide, in northwestern Victoria Land, Antarctica. The range is bounded on the west by Rawle Glacier and Leitch Massif, on the northwest by Black Glacier and on the NE and east by the head of Lillie Glacier. The range forms part of the Concord Mountains.

== Exploration and naming ==
The range was mapped by the USGS from surveys and U.S. Navy aerial photographs, 1960–63. Named by US-ACAN for Cdr. James P. King, USN, staff meteorological officer on Deep Freeze operations, 1962–64.

== Location ==
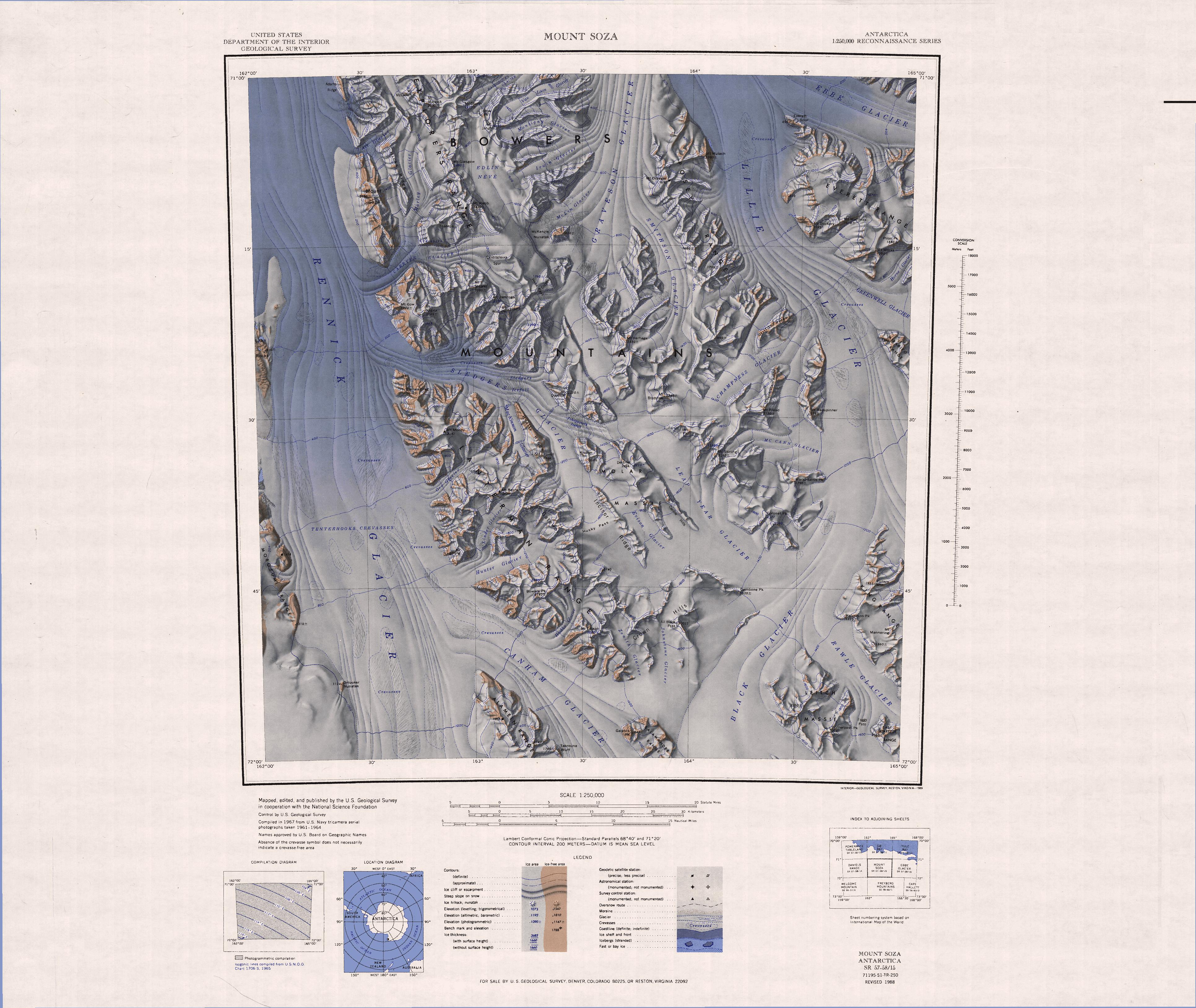
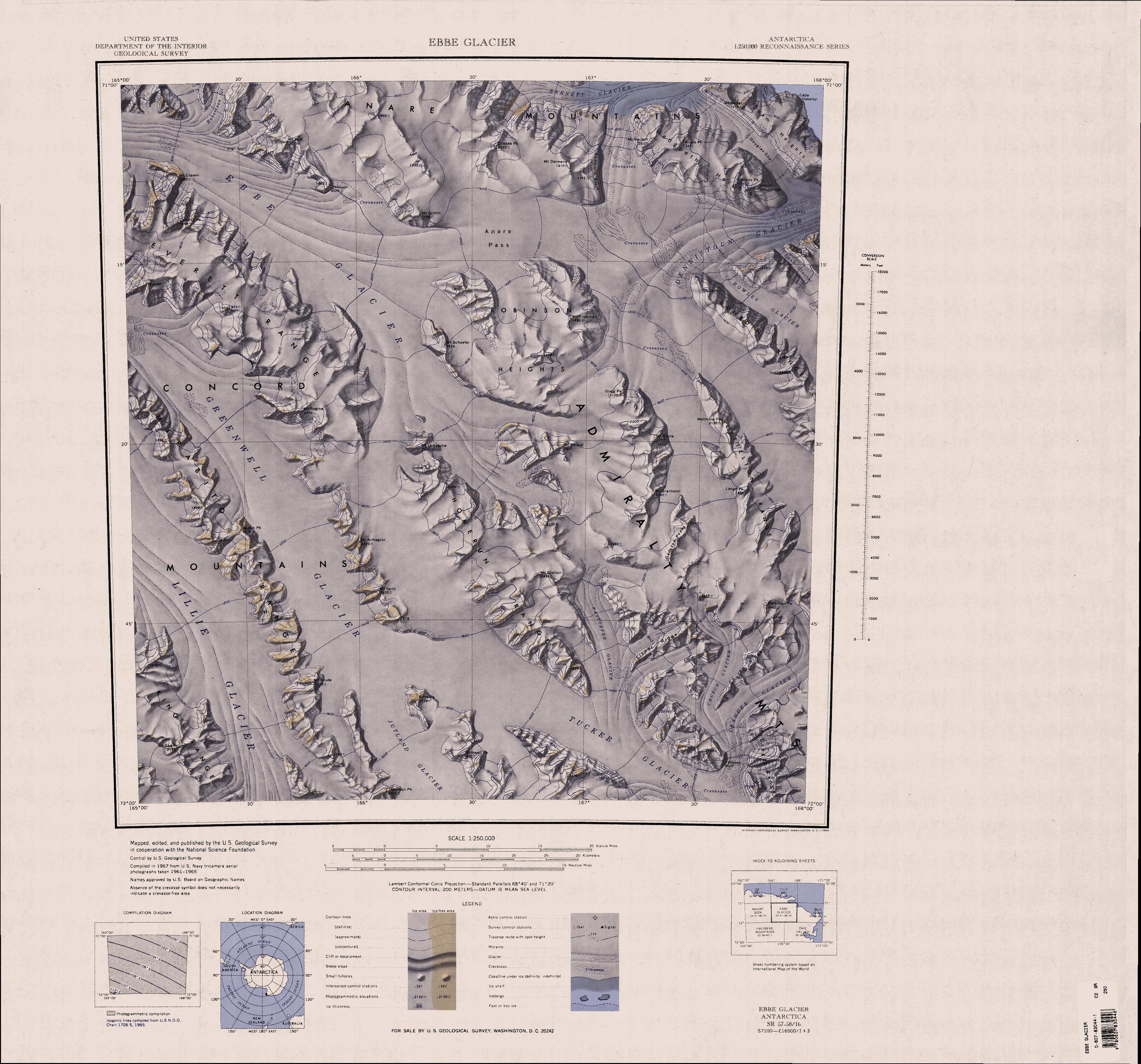
King Range

== Sources ==
- Alberts, Fred G., ed. (1995), Geographic Names of the Antarctic (PDF) (2 ed.), United States Board on Geographic Names This article incorporates public domain material from websites or documents of the United States Board on Geographic Names.
- Ebbe Glacier, USGS: United States Geographic Board
- Mount Soza, USGS: United States Geographic Board

This article incorporates public domain material from websites or documents of the United States Geological Survey.
