= West Quartzite Range =

Mountain ranges of Victoria Land

- Location within Antarctica

Geography
- Continent: Antarctica
- Region(s): Victoria Land, Antarctica
- Range coordinates: 72°0′S 164°45′E

West Quartzite Range (72°0′S 164°45′E) is a range, the western of two parallel quartzite ranges, situated at the east side of Houliston Glacier in the Concord Mountains, Antarctica. It was named by the Northern Party of the New Zealand Federated Mountain Clubs Antarctic Expedition (NZFMCAE), 1962–63, after the distinctive geological formation of the feature.

== Location ==
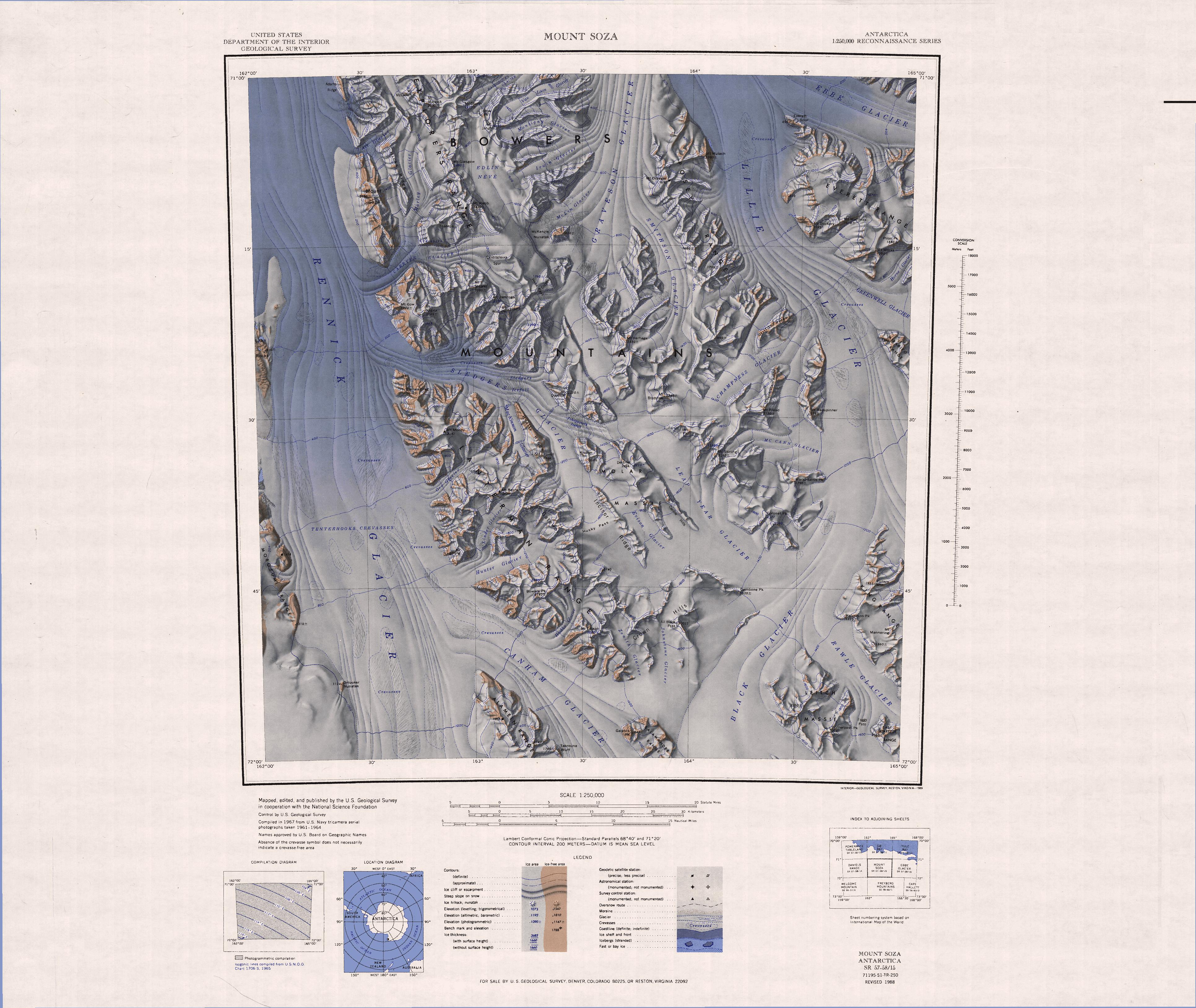
Terrain north of West Quartzite Range

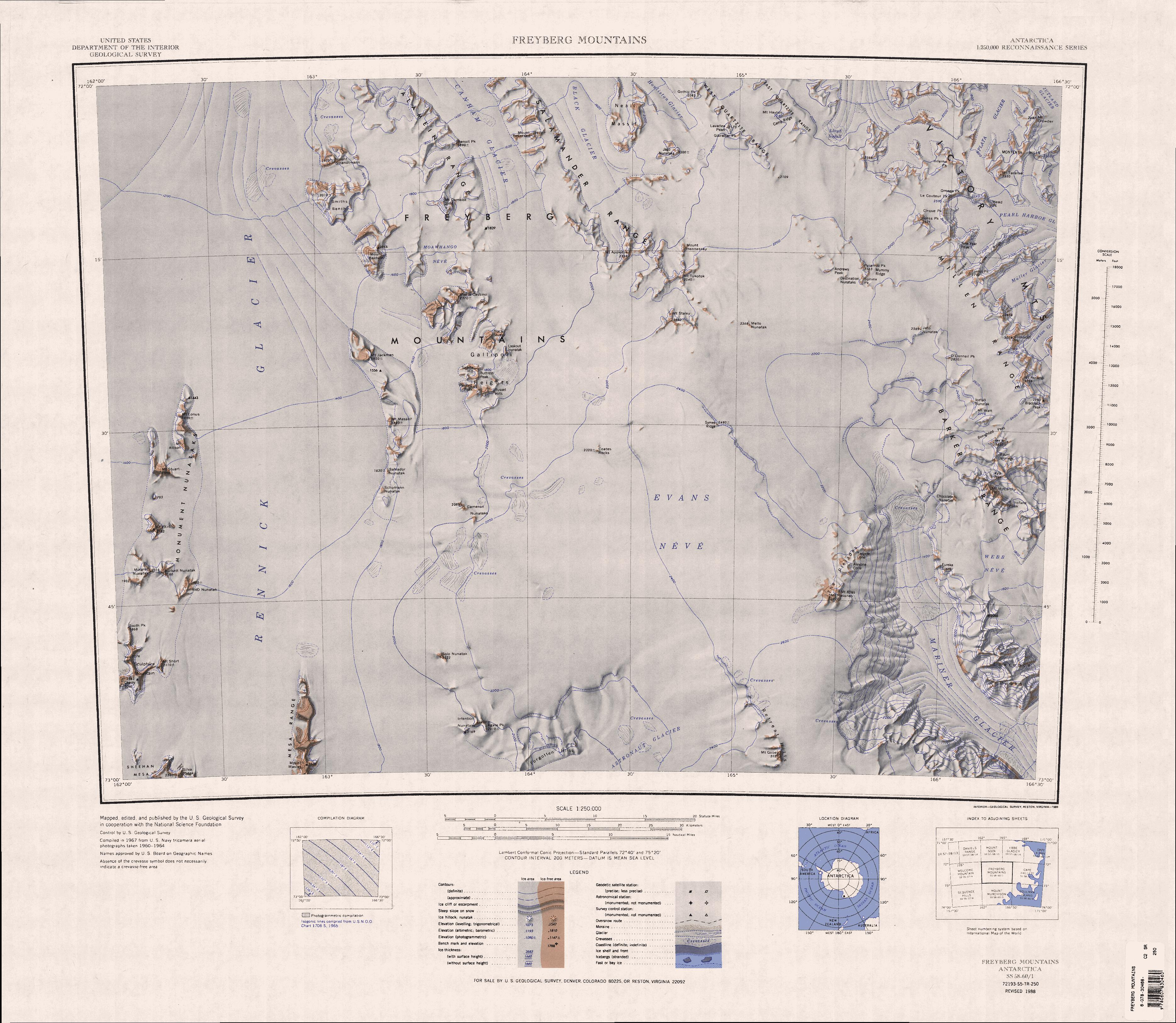
West Quartzite Range east of center in north of map

The West Quartzite Range is part of the Concord Mountains. The range runs northwest–southeast, parallel to the East Quartzite Range to the east. The Houliston Glacier to its west separates it from the Neall Massif and Jago Nunataks. The Salamander Range of the Freyberg Mountains is further to the west. The line of the range extends towards the Destination Nunataks to the southeast. The Black Glacier lies to the north of the Leitch Massif, the northern end of the range.

== Features ==
=== Leitch Massif ===
71°55′S 164°36′E. A mountain massif that forms the northern part of the West Quartzite Range. Named by the northern party of NZFMCAE, 1962-63, for E.G. Leitch, geologist with this party.

=== Cornerpost Peak ===
71°57′S 164°40′E. A peak, 2,160 metres (7,090 ft) high, at the southeast end of the Leitch Massif. So named by the northern party of NZFMCAE, 1962-63, because they established their most northerly survey station here on the turning point of their traverse.

=== Gothic Peak ===
72°01′S 164°48′E. A peak, 2,085 metres (6,841 ft) high, standing 4 nautical miles (7.4 km; 4.6 mi) northwest of Lavallee Peak. Named by the Northern Party of NZFMCAE, 1962-63, for its likeness in profile to a Gothic cathedral.

=== Lavallee Peak ===
72°04′S 164°56′E. A peak, 2,175 metres (7,136 ft) high, just northwest of Gibraltar Peak. Mapped by the United States Geological Survey (USGS) from surveys and United States Navy air photos, 1960-64. Named by United States Advisory Committee on Antarctic Names (US-ACAN) for Lieutenant David O. Lavallee, United States Navy, biological diver at McMurdo Station, summers 1963-64, 1964-65 and 1966-67.

=== Gibraltar Peak ===
72°05′S 164°59′E. A peak 1 nautical mile (1.9 km; 1.2 mi) southeast of Lavallee Peak. Named by the New Zealand Geological Survey Antarctic Expedition (NZGSAE), 1967-68, because it is shaped like the famous rock of the same name.

== Nearby features ==
=== Neall Massif ===
72°04′S 164°28′E. A mountain massif rising between the Salamander and West Quartzite Ranges. Named by the NZ-APC for V.E. Neall, leader and geologist of the NZGSAE, 1967-68.

=== Jago Nunataks ===
72°06′S 164°40′E. A cluster of closely spaced nunataks rising to 2,300 metres (7,500 ft) high, centered 3 nautical miles (5.6 km; 3.5 mi) east of the south end of Neall Massif. Named by the New Zealand Antarctic Place-Names Committee (NZ-APC) in 1983 after J.B. Jago, geologist with NZARP geological parties to this area in 1974-75 and 1980-81.

== Sources ==
- Alberts, Fred G., ed. (1995), Geographic Names of the Antarctic (PDF) (2 ed.), United States Board on Geographic Names This article incorporates public domain material from websites or documents of the United States Board on Geographic Names.
- Freyberg Mountains, USGS: United States Geographic Board
- Mount Soza, USGS: United States Geographic Board

This article incorporates public domain material from websites or documents of the United States Geological Survey.
