= Concord Mountains =

Mountain ranges in Victoria Land, Antarctica

- Location within Antarctica

Highest point
- Elevation: 3,160 m (10,370 ft)

Geography
- Continent: Antarctica
- Area: Pennell Coast, Victoria Land
- Range coordinates: 71°35′S 165°10′E

Concord Mountains is a group name applied to a complex system of ranges in northwest Victoria Land, Antarctica. They comprise the Everett Range, Mirabito Range, King Range, Leitch Massif, East Quartzite Range and West Quartzite Range. They are north of the Admiralty Mountains, northeast of the Victory Mountains, southeast of the Bowers Mountains and south of the Anare Mountains.

== Exploration and naming ==
The Concord Mountains were mapped by the United States Geological Survey (USGS) from surveys and United States Navy aerial photographs from 1960–63. The name "Concord" was chosen by the northern party of the New Zealand Geological Survey Antarctic Expedition (NZGSAE), which explored the area in 1963–64, in honor of international harmony in Antarctica, and in particular for the fact that five nations participated in the region's exploration.

== Location ==
The Leitch Massif and King Range in the west of the Concord Mountains lie to the southeast of the Bowers Mountains, from which they are separated by the Black Glacier, a tributary of the Lillie Glacier. The Mirabito Range and Everett Range in the northwest of the Concord Mountains lie to the east of the Bowers Mountains, from which they are separated by the Lillie Glacier. The Ebbe Glacier, a tributary of the Lillie Glacier, runs to the north and east of the Everett Range, separating it from the Anare Mountains to the northeast and from Robinson Heights in the Admiralty Mountains to the east. Further south the Homerun Range of the Admiralty Mountains lies to the east of the Mirabito Range. The Victory Mountains extend across the south of the range between the Jutland Glacier and the Tucker Glacier. The East Quartzite Range and West Quartzite Range in the southeast of the Concord Mountains are to the north of the Victory Mountains and east of the Salamander Range of the Freyberg Mountains.

== Glaciers ==
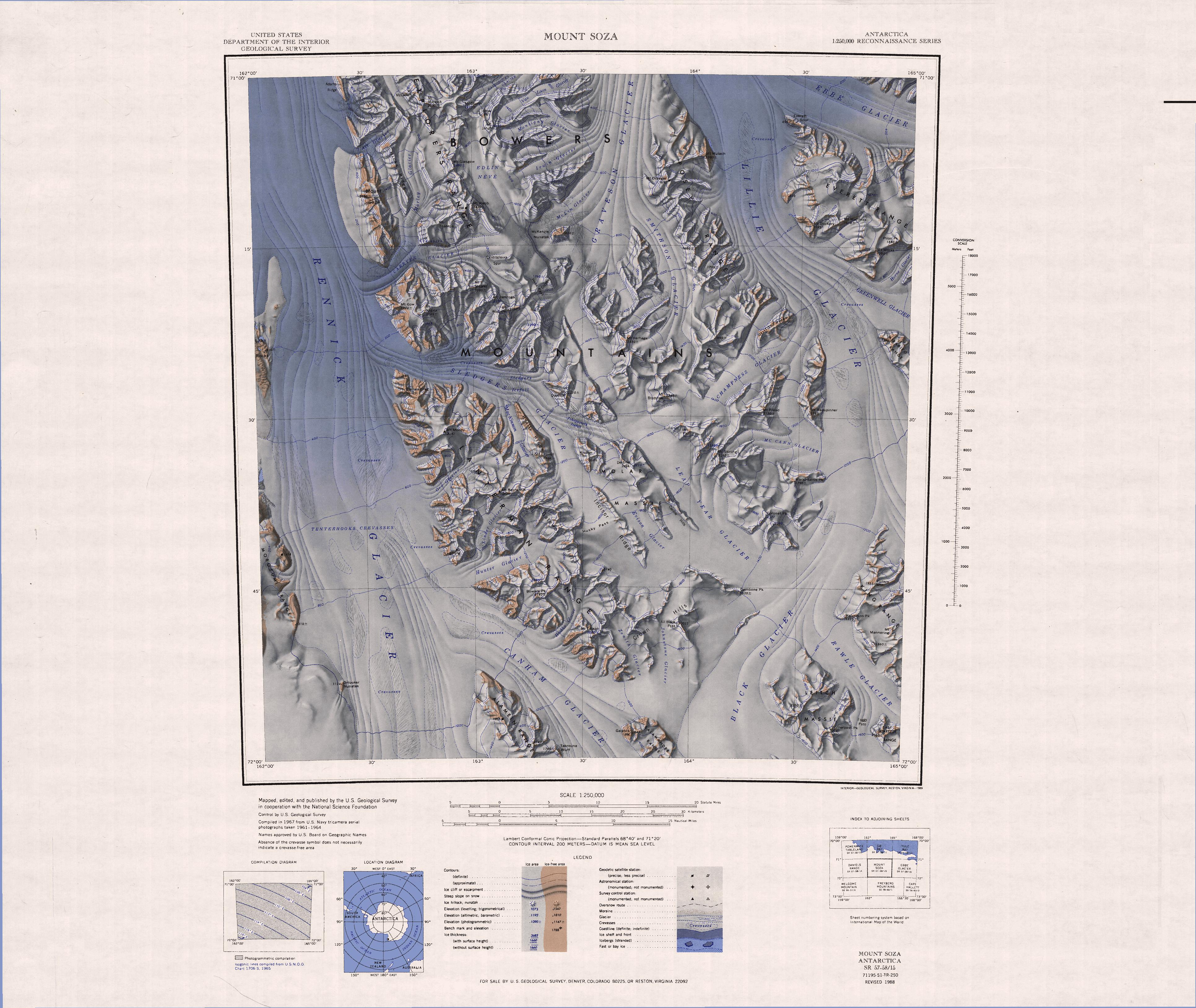
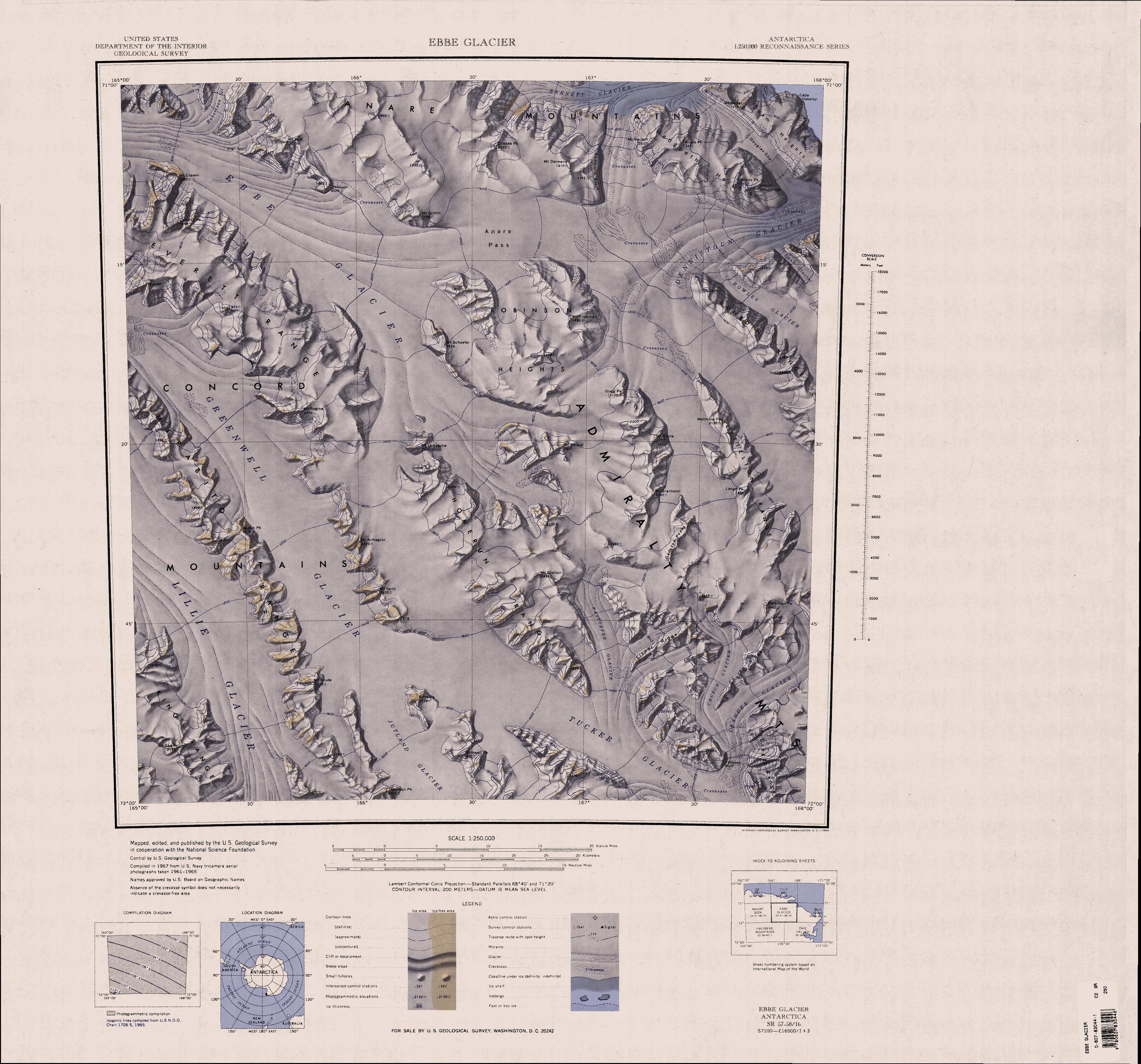

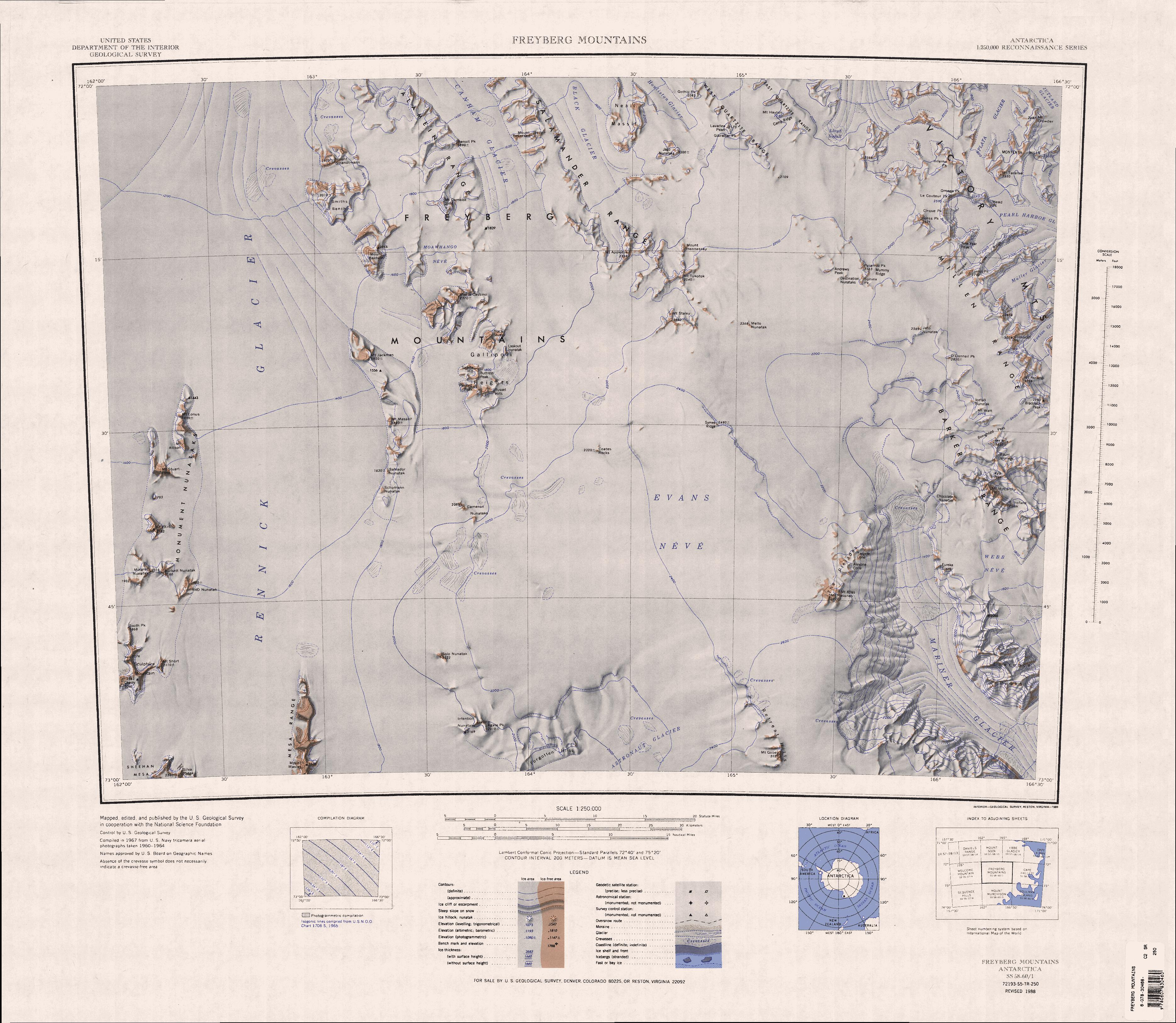
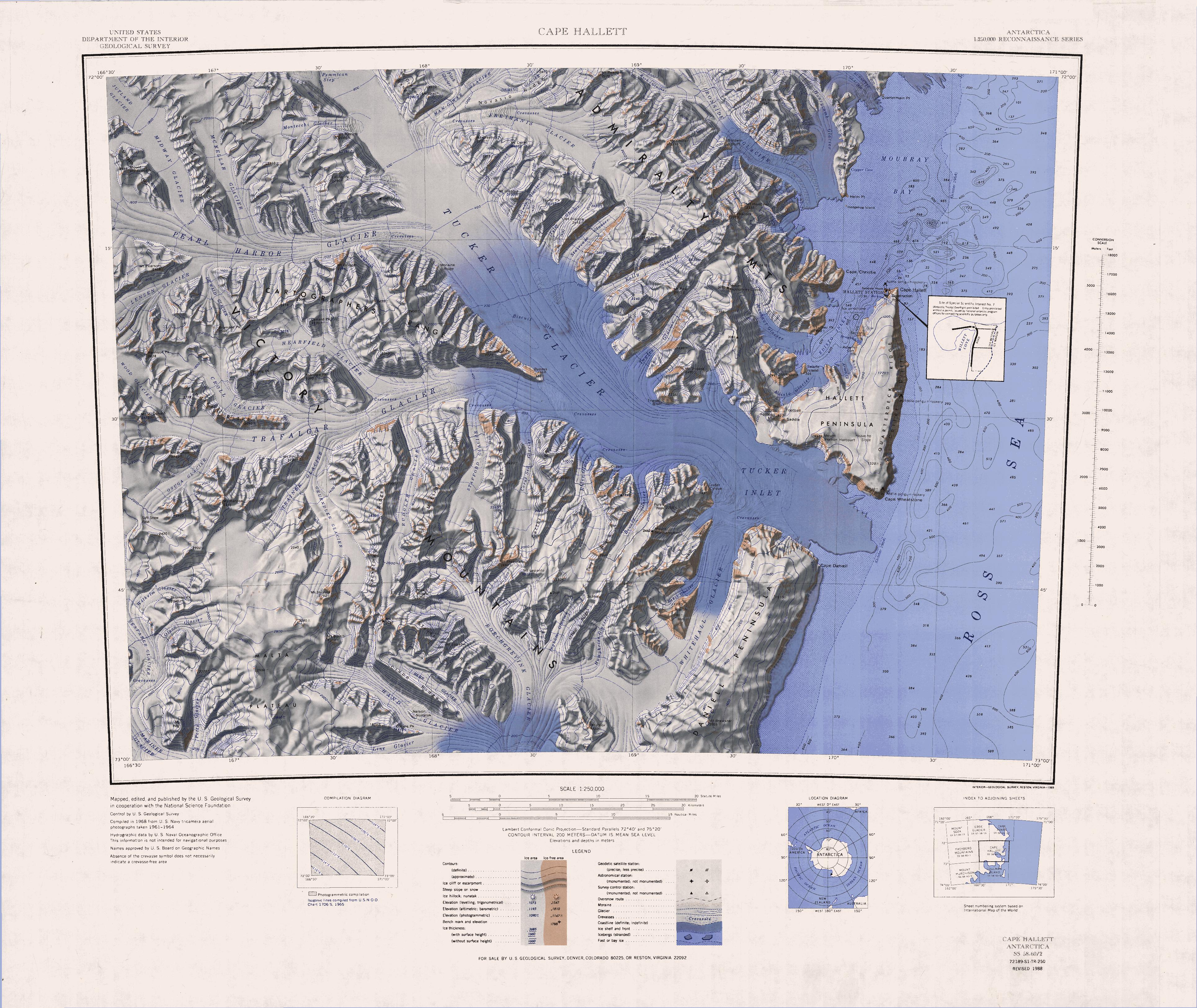
Concord Mountains in center of the group of maps
- Lillie Glacier 70°45′S 163°55′E, a large glacier in Antarctica, about 100 nautical miles (190 km; 120 mi) long and 10 nautical miles (19 km; 12 mi) wide. It lies between the Bowers Mountains on the west and the Concord Mountains and Anare Mountains on the east, flowing to Ob' Bay on the coast and forming the Lillie Glacier Tongue.
- Black Glacier 71°40′S 164°42′E, a broad tributary to the Lillie Glacier flowing northeast, marking the southeast extent of the Bowers Mountains.
- Ebbe Glacier 71°03′S 164°45′E, a tributary glacier about 60 nautical miles (110 km; 69 mi) long, draining northwest from the Homerun Range and Robinson Heights, and then west-northwest between the Everett Range and Anare Mountains into Lillie Glacier. This feature saddles with Tucker Glacier, the latter draining southeast to the Ross Sea.
- Rawle Glacier 71°50′S 164°40′E, a tributary glacier in the Concord Mountains, flowing northwest between Leitch Massif and King Range into the Black Glacier.
- Houliston Glacier 72°00′S 164°34′E, a tributary glacier between Neall Massif and West Quartzite Range, flowing northwest into Black Glacier.
- Greenwell Glacier 71°20′S 165°00′E, a major tributary glacier, 45 nautical miles (83 km; 52 mi) long, draining northwest between Mirabito Range and Everett Range to enter Lillie Glacier below Mount Works.
- Jutland Glacier 71°55′S 166°12′E, a broad tributary glacier, 15 nautical miles (28 km; 17 mi) long and 4 nautical miles (7.4 km; 4.6 mi) wide, in the Victory Mountains. It drains northwest from a common divide with Midway Glacier to join the flow of the Greenwell Glacier northwest of Boss Peak.

== Ranges ==
- Everett Range 71°20′S 165°40′E, a rugged, mainly ice-covered range nearly 60 nautical miles (110 km; 69 mi) long between Greenwell Glacier and Ebbe Glacier.
- Mirabito Range 71°40′S 165°27′E, a narrow, northwest-trending mountain range, 64 kilometres (40 mi) long and 6 kilometres (3.7 mi) wide that lies between the upper part of Lillie Glacier and the Greenwell Glacier.
- King Range 71°52′S 165°03′E, a mountain range, 14 nautical miles (26 km; 16 mi) long and 5 nautical miles (9.3 km; 5.8 mi) wide, in northwestern Victoria Land, Antarctica. The range is bounded on the west by Rawle Glacier and Leitch Massif, on the northwest by Black Glacier and on the NE and east by the head of Lillie Glacier.
- East Quartzite Range 72°0′S 165°5′E, a mountain range, 12 nautical miles (22 km; 14 mi) long, forming a subordinate southwest unit of the King Range. These mountains lie approximately 5 nautical miles (9.3 km; 5.8 mi) east of the nearby West Quartzite Range.
- West Quartzite Range 72°0′S 164°45′E, a range, the western of two parallel quartzite ranges, situated at the east side of Houliston Glacier.

== Sources ==
- Alberts, Fred G., ed. (1995), Geographic Names of the Antarctic (PDF) (2 ed.), United States Board on Geographic Names This article incorporates public domain material from websites or documents of the United States Board on Geographic Names.
- Cape Hallet, USGS: United States Geographic Board
- Ebbe Glacier, USGS: United States Geographic Board
- Freyberg Mountains, USGS: United States Geographic Board
- Mount Soza, USGS: United States Geographic Board

This article incorporates public domain material from websites or documents of the United States Geological Survey.
