= Mount Riddolls =

Mountain in the Antarctic

- Location within Antarctica

Highest point
- Elevation: 3,295 m (10,810 ft)
- Coordinates: 72°48′S 167°46′E

Geography
- Location: Borchgrevink Coast, Victoria Land, Antarctica
- Parent range: Victory Mountains, Rudolph Glacier

Mount Riddolls (72°48′S 167°46′E) is a very prominent mountain, 3,295 metres (10,810 ft) high, situated directly at the head of Rudolph Glacier in the Victory Mountains of Victoria Land, Antarctica.

== Name ==
Mount Riddolls was named by the Mariner Glacier geology party of the New Zealand Geological Survey Antarctic Expedition (NZGSAE) of 1966–67, for Bruce W. Riddolls, the assistant geologist with the party.

== Location ==
Mount Riddolls is in the Victory Mountains above the head of the Borchgrevink Glacier. The Hand Glacier is to the south. It is east of the Malta Plateau and southwest of Mount Freeman The Clapp Ridge, Stever Ridge and Hackerman Ridge radiate from the mountain, as does the ridge that holds Mount Frosch. Mount Lopatin stands on the Stever Ridge.

== Features ==
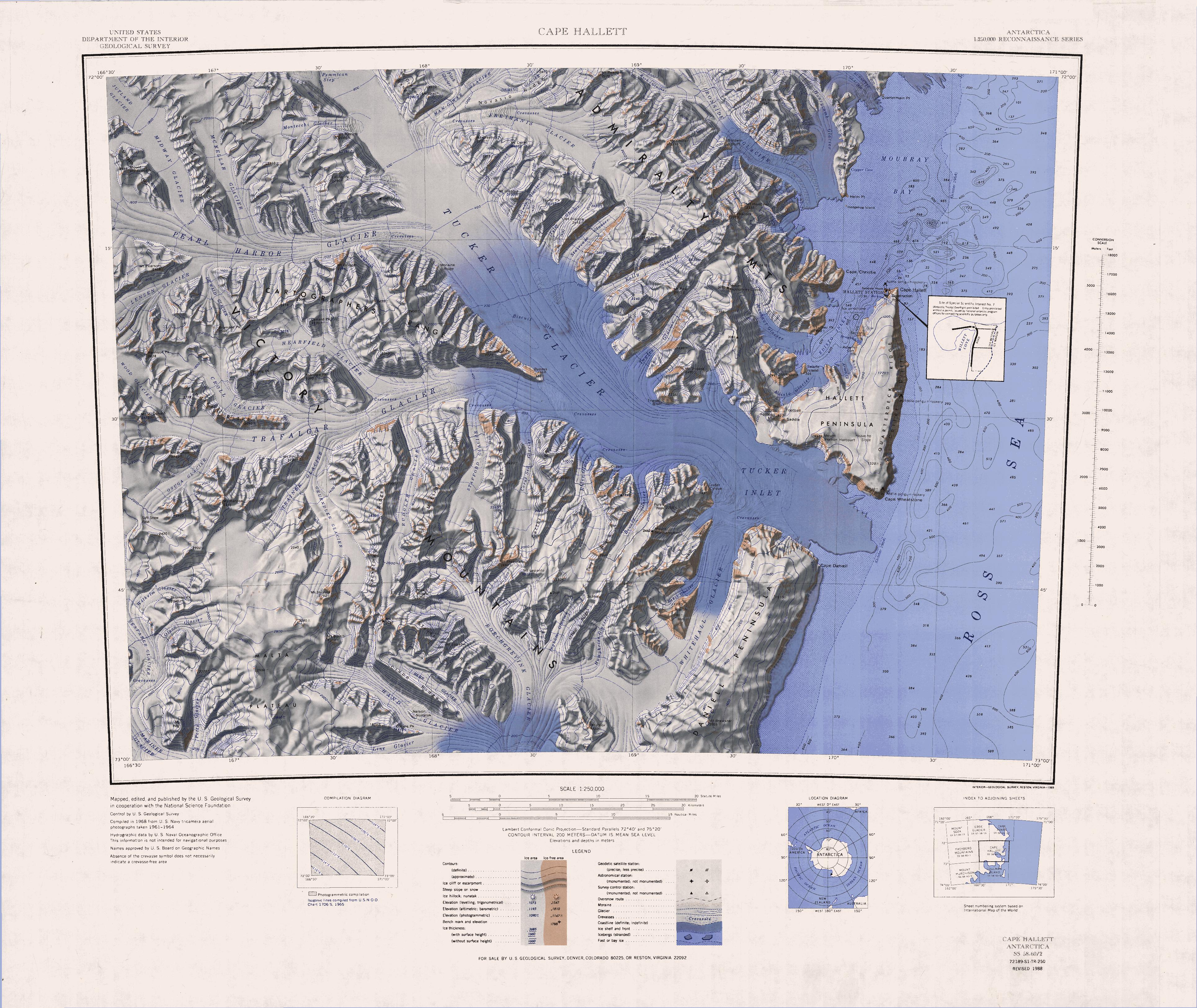
North of plateau Peak in southwest of map

=== Clapp Ridge ===
72°54′S 167°54′E. A narrow, steep-sided ridge about 9 nautical miles (17 km; 10 mi) long, forming the north wall of Hand Glacier. Mapped by the United States Geological Survey (USGS) from surveys and United States Navy air photos, 1960-64. Named by the United States Advisory Committee on Antarctic Names (US-ACAN) for James L. Clapp, member of the United States ArmyRP glaciological party to Roosevelt Island, 1967-68.

=== Stever Ridge ===
72°51′S 168°02′E. Irregular ridge stretching southeast from Mount Riddolls to the confluence of Behr Glacier and Borchgrevink Glacier. Named by US-ACAN for H. Guyford Stever, Director of the National Science Foundation, 1972-74, which has overall administrative responsibility for the United States Antarctic Research Program (USARP). He traveled and worked in Antarctica on two occasions, 1973 and 1975.

=== Mount Lopatin ===
72°51′S 168°04′E. A mountain 2,670 metres (8,760 ft) high situated 6 nautical miles (11 km; 6.9 mi) east-southeast of Mount Riddolls. Mapped by USGS from surveys and United States Navy air photos, 1960-64. Named by US-ACAN for Boris Lopatin, Soviet exchange scientist at McMurdo Station, 1968.

=== Mount Frosch ===
72°46′S 167°55′E. A mainly snow-covered mountain 2,750 metres (9,020 ft) high standing 3 nautical miles (5.6 km; 3.5 mi) northeast of Mount Riddolls at the head of Borchgrevink Glacier. Mapped by the USGS from surveys and United States Navy aerial photographs, 1960-62. Named by US-ACAN for Robert A. Frosch, Assistant Secretary of the Navy for Research and Development, 1971-72; Administrator, National Aeronautics and Space Administration 1978.

=== Hackerman Ridge ===
72°39′S 167°46′E. A large mountainous ridge trending north–south between the Gruendler and Rudolph Glaciers. Named by US-ACAN for Norman Hackerman, member of National Science Board, 1968-78; Chairman since 1974. He visited Antarctica in 1975 and 1977 as part of his official duties in support of the United States scientific program in Antarctica.

=== Mount Randall ===
72°48′S 167°40′E. A mountain rising to 3,000 metres (9,800 ft) high at the south end of Hackerman Ridge. The mountain, which forms the summit area in this part of the ridge, is 2 nautical miles (3.7 km; 2.3 mi) west of Mount Riddolls and 3.5 nautical miles (6.5 km; 4.0 mi) northeast of Mount Burrill, with which this name is associated. Named by the US-ACAN in 1994 after Richard R. Randall, geographer and cartographer, Executive Secretary, United States Board on Geographic Names, 1973-93, whose office included responsibility for geographic nomenclature in Antarctica. Succeeding Meredith F. Burrill as Executive Secretary, Randall combined with Burrill to direct a half-century of American geographic names research.

== Sources ==
- Alberts, Fred G., ed. (1995), Geographic Names of the Antarctic (PDF) (2 ed.), United States Board on Geographic Names This article incorporates public domain material from websites or documents of the United States Board on Geographic Names.
- Cape Hallet, USGS: United States Geographic Board

This article incorporates public domain material from websites or documents of the United States Geological Survey.
