= Mount Holdsworth =

Mount Holdsworth may refer to:

- Mount Holdsworth, in the Monteath Hills in Antarctica
- Mount Holdsworth (New Zealand), a mountain in the Tararua Range in New Zealand
- Mount Holdsworth, New Zealand, a rural locality and a statistical area in Wellington
