= Borchgrevink Glacier =

Glacier in Antarctica

- Location within Antarctica
- Location: Victoria Land
- Coordinates: 73°4′S 168°30′E
- Terminus: Ross Sea

Borchgrevink Glacier (73°4′S 168°30′E) is a large glacier in the Victory Mountains, Victoria Land, Antarctica. It drains south between Malta Plateau and Daniell Peninsula, and thence projects into Glacier Strait, Ross Sea, as a floating glacier tongue.

== Exploration and naming ==
It was named by the New Zealand Geological Survey Antarctic Expedition, 1957–58, for Carsten Borchgrevink, leader of the British Antarctic Expedition, 1898–1900. Borchgrevink visited the area in February 1900 and first observed the seaward portion of the glacier.

== Geography ==
The Borchgrevink Glacier forms between Mount Frosch and Mount Lepanto in the Victory Mountains to the south of Trafalgar Glacier, and flows southeast and then south to the Ross Sea. It is joined by several small glaciers from the left (northeast) including Ingham Glacier just before O'Neal Ridge and Humphries Glacier just after that ridge. Humphries Glacier saddles with Whitehall Glacier, which flows northeast between the mainland and Daniell Peninsula. Past Stever Ridge to its west, the Borchgrevink Glacier is joined by Behr Glacier, Hand Glacier, which flows past both sides of Nelson Nunatak, and Line Glacier. The Bargh Glacier and Langevad Glacier join it from the Daniell Peninsula to the east. Past Cape Crossfire it enters Lady Newnes Bay beside Mariner Glacier, forming the Borchgrevink Glacier Tongue, which extends towards Coulman Island.

== Left tributaries ==
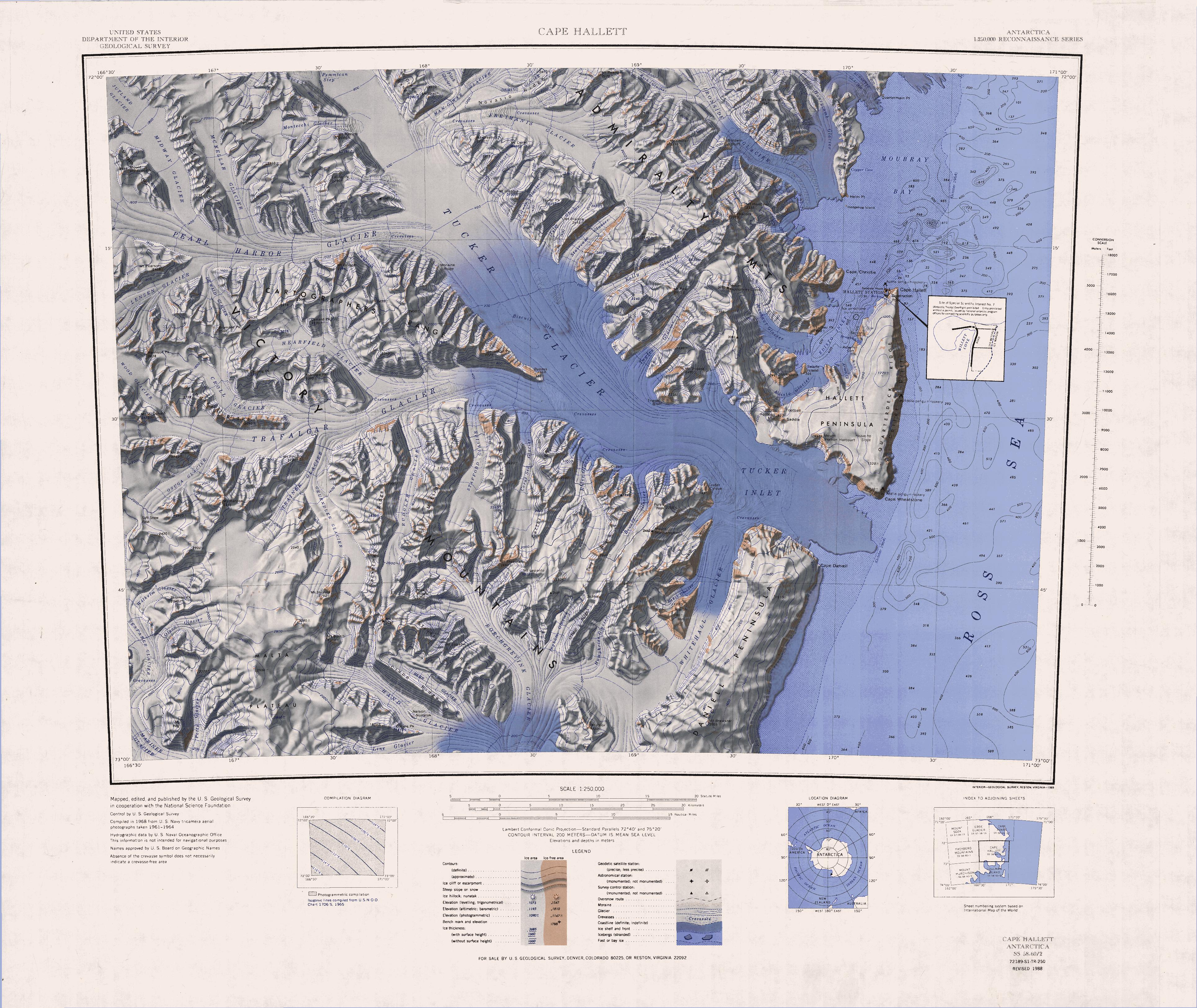
Glacier in south center of map

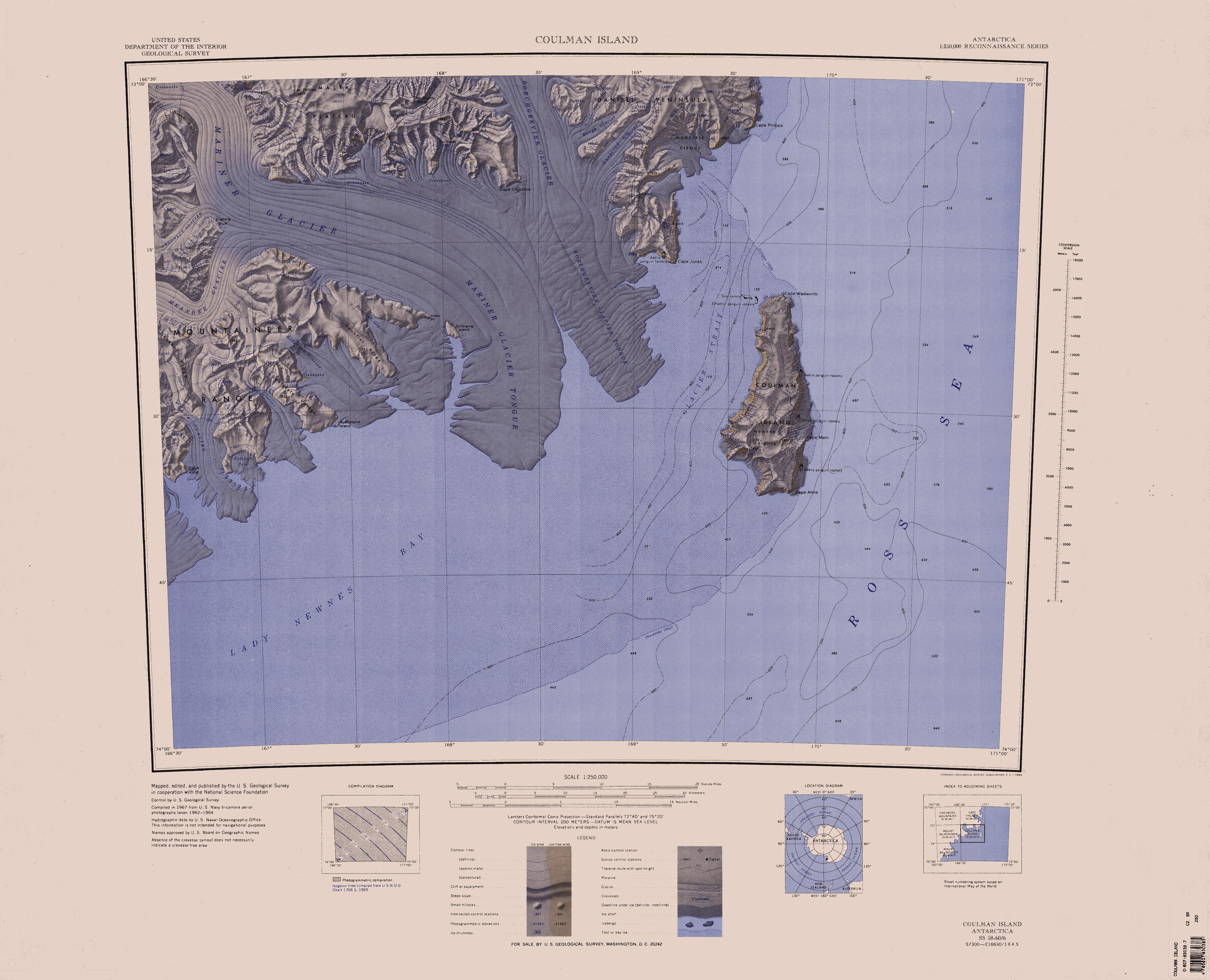
Mouth and tongue in north center of map

Tributaries from the left (northeast) include,

=== Ingham Glacier ===
72°50′S 168°38′E. A tributary glacier 3 nautical miles (5.6 km; 3.5 mi) west of Humphries Glacier, flowing south into Borchgrevink Glacier in the Victory Mountains. Mapped by the United States Geological Survey (USGS) from surveys and United States Navy air photos, 1960-62. Named by the United States Advisory Committee on Antarctic Names (US-ACAN) for Clayton E. Ingham, New Zealand geophysicist at Hallett Station, 1957.

=== Humphries Glacier ===
72°51′S 168°50′E. Steep tributary glacier just east of Ingham Glacier, flowing generally southwest ward to join Borchgrevink Glacier northwest ward of Mount Prior, in the Victory Mountains. Mapped by USGS from surveys and United States Navy air photos, 1960-62. Named by US-ACAN for John G. Humphries, New Zealand ionospheric scientist at Hallett Station, 1957.

=== Bargh Glacier ===
73°05′S 168°46′E. A glacier 6 nautical miles (11 km; 6.9 mi) long in the southwest part of Daniell Peninsula. It lies 2 nautical miles (3.7 km; 2.3 mi) north of Langevad Glacier, whose stream it parallels, and flows southwest to enter Borchgrevink Glacier. Mapped by USGS from surveys and United States Navy air photos, 1960-64. Named by US-ACAN for Kenneth A. Bargh, seismologist at Hallett Station, 1958.

=== Langevad Glacier ===
73°08′S 168°50′E. A glacier located 2 nautical miles (3.7 km; 2.3 mi) south of Bargh Glacier and just west of Narrow Neck, draining southwest from the Daniell Peninsula into the lower part of Borchgrevink Glacier. Mapped by USGS from surveys and United States Navy air photos, 1960-64. Named by US-ACAN for Michael W. Langevad, electronics technician at Hallett Station, 1957.

== Right tributaries ==
Tributaries from the right (southwest ) include,

=== Behr Glacier ===
72°55′S 168°05′E. Steep tributary glacier, 7 nautical miles (13 km; 8.1 mi) long, flowing east along the north side of Clapp Ridge to join Borchgrevink Glacier. The glacier first appears on a 1960 New Zealand map compiled from United States Navy aerial photographs. Named by US-ACAN for Colonel Robert Behr, United States Air Force, who was of assistance in the review of United States policy toward Antarctica in 1970-71 period.

=== Hand Glacier ===
72°58′S 168°05′E. A deeply entrenched valley glacier that drains the east slopes of Malta Plateau and flows east along the south side of Clapp Ridge into the Borchgrevink Glacier, in the Victory Mountains, Victoria Land. Mapped by USGS from surveys and United States Navy air photos, 1960-64. Named by US-ACAN for Cadet H. Hand, biologist at McMurdo Station, 1967-68.

=== Line Glacier ===
72°59′S 167°50′E. A glacier that drains the south part of the east slopes of Malta Plateau and flows east between Collins Peak and Mount Alberts into Borchgrevink Glacier, in Victoria Land. Mapped by USGS from surveys and United States Navy air photos, 1960-64. Named by US-ACAN for Kenneth Line, traverse engineer with the USARP glaciological party at Roosevelt Island, 1967-68.

== Other features ==
=== Nelson Nunatak ===
72°56′S 167°54′E. A mainly ice-covered nunatak in the middle of Hand Glacier. Mapped by USGS from surveys and United States Navy air photos, 1960-64. Named by US-ACAN for Thomas R. Nelson, United States Navy, construction mechanic at McMurdo Station, 1967.

=== Cape Crossfire ===
73°10′S 168°21′E. A promontory at the southeast extremity of Malta Plateau, marking the point of convergence of the Mariner Glacier from the west and Borchgrevink Glacier from the north. The name alludes to the converging flow of ice at this feature from different directions, and was given by New Zealand Antarctic Place-Names Committee (NZ-APC) in 1966.

=== Borchgrevink Glacier Tongue ===
73°21′S 168°50′E. The large seaward extension of the Borchgrevink Glacier. It discharges into Glacier Strait, Ross Sea, just south of Cape Jones. Named in association with Borchgrevink Glacier.

== Sources ==
- Alberts, Fred G., ed. (1995), Geographic Names of the Antarctic (PDF) (2 ed.), United States Board on Geographic Names This article incorporates public domain material from websites or documents of the United States Board on Geographic Names.
- Cape Hallet, USGS: United States Geological Survey
- Coulman Island, USGS: United States Geological Survey

This article incorporates public domain material from websites or documents of the United States Geological Survey.
