= Monteath Hills =

Group of mountains in the Victory Mountains of Victoria Land, Antarctica

- Location within Antarctica

Geography
- Continent: Antarctica
- Region(s): Victoria Land, Antarctica
- Range coordinates: 72°6′S 166°30′E

The Monteath Hills (72°6′S 166°30′E) are a group of mountains in the Victory Mountains of Victoria Land, Antarctica, bounded by Jutland Glacier, Midway Glacier, Pearl Harbor Glacier, and Plata Glacier. The group includes Mount Crowder, Mount Tararua (2,550 metres (8,370 ft) high), and Mount Holdsworth. The hills were named by the New Zealand Antarctic Place-Names Committee (NZ-APC) in 1983, after Colin Monteath, a field operations officer with the Antarctic Division of the New Zealand Department of Scientific and Industrial Research.

== Location ==
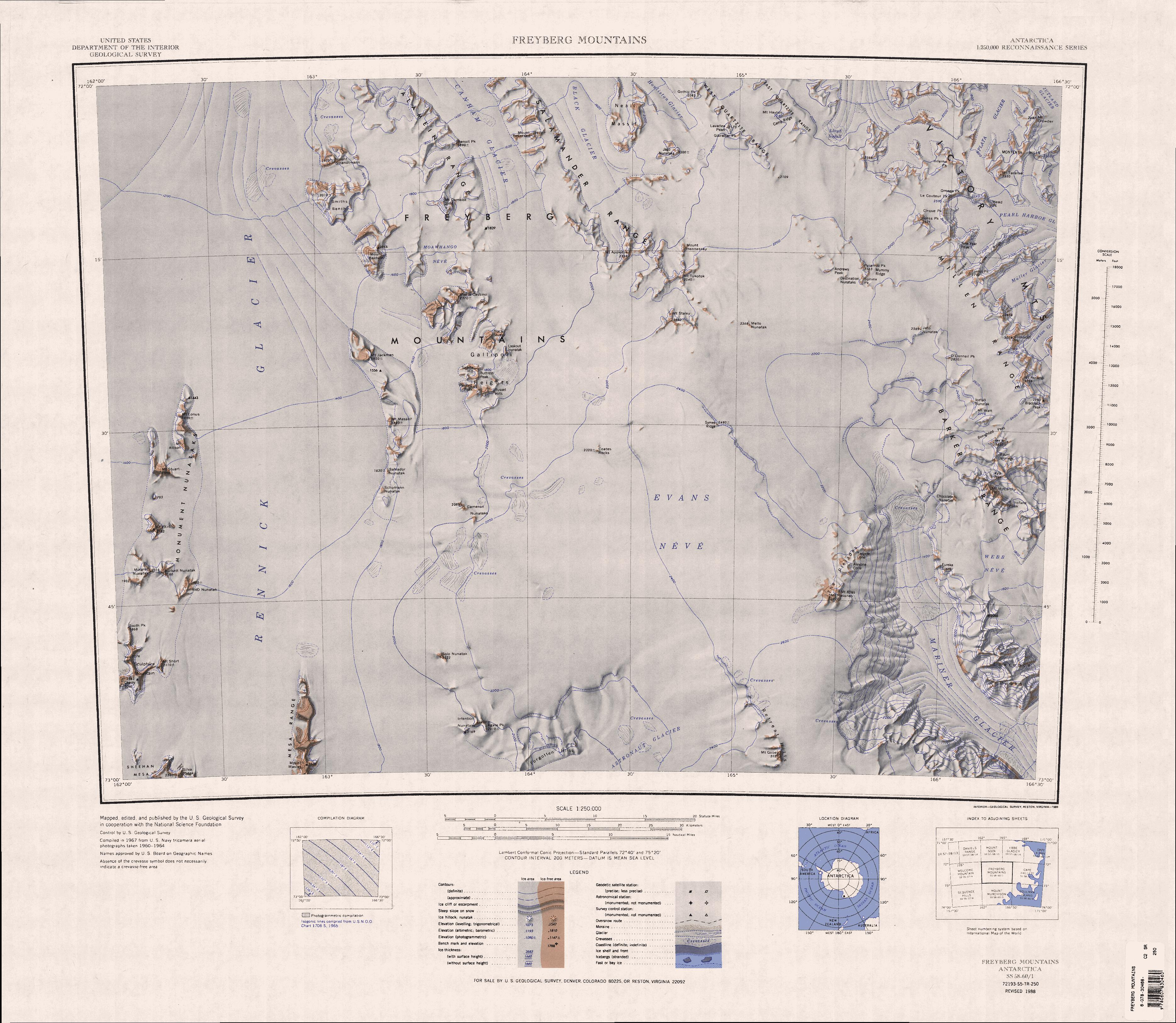
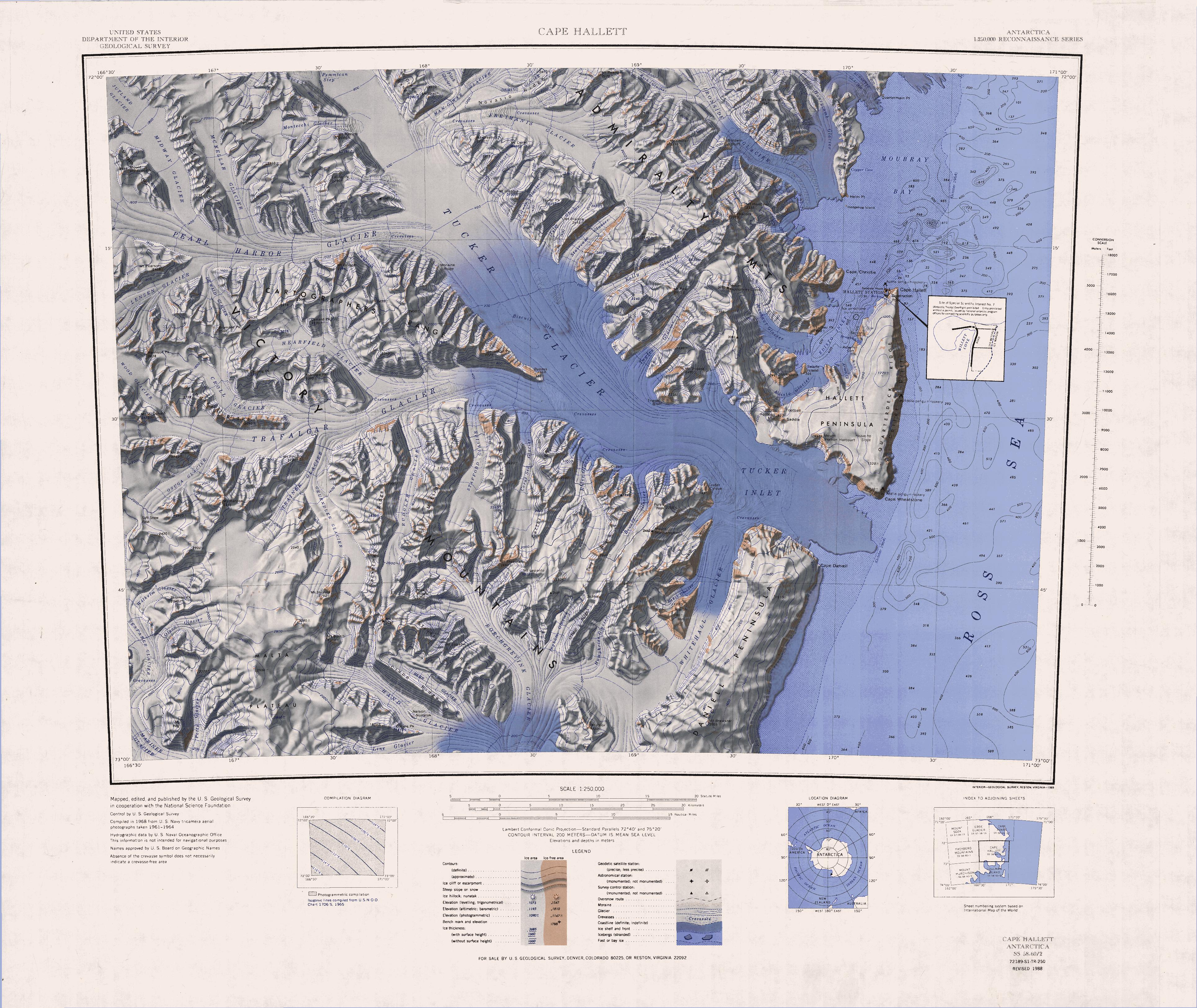
Monteath Hills in northeast of left map, northwest of right map

The Monteath Hills are bounded by the Plata Glacier to the northwest, Pearl Harbor Glacier to the south, Jutland Glacier to the northeast and Midway Glacier to the southeast. The Saxby Range is to the east of the Midway Glacier. The Millen Range lies to the south west.

== Features ==
=== Mount Crowder ===
72°03′S 166°23′E. A prominent mountain, 2,485 metres (8,153 ft) high, located 6 nautical miles (11 km; 6.9 mi) northeast of Mount Tararua. Mapped by United States Geological Survey (USGS) from surveys and United States Navy air photos, 1960-64. Named by United States Advisory Committee on Antarctic Names (US-ACAN) for Dwight F. Crowder, geologist at Hallett Station, summer 1964-65.

=== Mount Tararua ===
72°08′S 166°14′E. A prominent peak, 2,550 metres (8,370 ft) high, surmounting the southwest part of Monteath Hills. Climbed on January 3, 1963 by the Southern Party of NZFMCAE, 1962-63, who named it after their parent mountain club, the Tararua Tramping Club, Wellington, New Zealand.

=== Mount Holdsworth ===
72°08′S 166°35′E. A granite peak 2,360 metres (7,740 ft) high in the east part of Monteath Hills. Named by the New Zealand Federated Mountain Clubs Antarctic Expedition (NZFMCAE), 1962-63, after Gerald Holdsworth, leader of the northern party of this expedition.

== Sources ==
- Alberts, Fred G., ed. (1995), Geographic Names of the Antarctic (PDF) (2 ed.), United States Board on Geographic Names This article incorporates public domain material from websites or documents of the United States Board on Geographic Names.
- Cape Hallet, USGS: United States Geographic Board
- Freyberg Mountains, USGS: United States Geographic Board

This article incorporates public domain material from websites or documents of the United States Geological Survey.
