= Victory Mountains =

Mountain range

- Location within Antarctica

Highest point
- Elevation: 2,193 m (7,195 ft)

Geography
- Continent: Antarctica
- Region(s): Victoria Land, Antarctica
- Range coordinates: 72°40′S 168°00′E

The Victory Mountains (72°40′S 168°00′E) are a major group of mountains in Victoria Land, Antarctica, about 100 nautical miles (190 km; 120 mi) long and 50 nautical miles (93 km; 58 mi) wide, which is bounded primarily by Mariner and Tucker glaciers and the Ross Sea. They are north of the Mountaineer Range, east of the Freyberg Mountains and south of the Concord Mountains and the Admiralty Mountains. The division between the Victory Mountains and the Concord Mountains (to the northwest) is not precise but apparently lies in the vicinity of Thomson Peak.

== Exploration and name ==
A Ross Sea aspect of the mountains was first obtained by early British expeditions of James Clark Ross, Carsten Borchgrevink, Robert Falcon Scott and Ernest Shackleton. The mapping of the interior mountains was largely done from air photos taken by the United States Navy and surveys undertaken by New Zealand and American parties in the 1950s and 1960s. The Victory Mountains were named by the New Zealand Geological Survey Antarctic Expedition (NZGSAE) 1957–58, because of the proximity of this group to the Admiralty Mountains, and with the intention that many of the topographic features would be named for celebrated victories, especially naval victories.

== Location ==
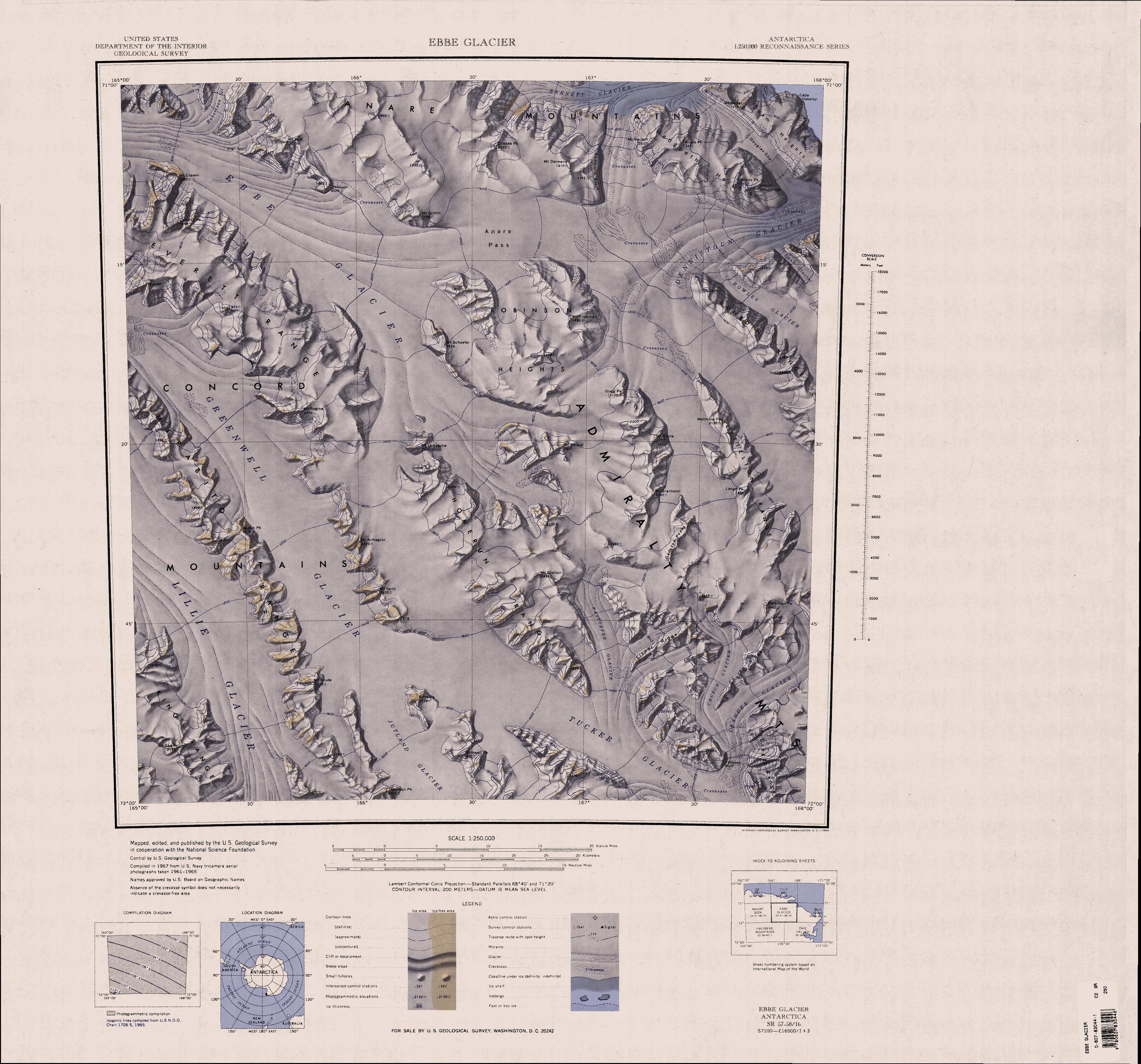
Northern tip of Victory Mountains in extreme south of map between Jutland Glacier and Tucker Glacier

=== Western mountains ===
The Monteath Hills are in the northwest of the Victory Mountains, east of the Freyberg Mountains. The Millen Range and Barker Range are to their south, east of the Evans Névé and the smaller Webb Névé. The Mariner Glacier forms to the west of the Barker Range and flows south and then east, separating the Victory Mountains from the Mountaineer Range.

=== Central mountains ===
The Saxby Range is to the west of the Monteath Hills, between Midway Glacier to the west, Pearl Harbor Glacier to the south and Tucker Glacier to the east, which flows to the southeast and separates the Victory Mountains from the Admiralty Mountains. The Cartographers Range is south of the Pearl Harbor Glacier and north of the Trafalgar Glacier. The Malta Plateau is to the south of the Trafalger Glacier and north of the Mariner Glacier.

=== Eastern mountains ===
The mountains to the east of the Malta Plateau and west of the Daniell Peninsula are not part of a formally named range. Mount Riddolls is at the center of a ridge system to the east of Borchgrevink Glacier, and Mount Freeman is at the center of a ridge system to the west of that glacier.

== Major glaciers ==
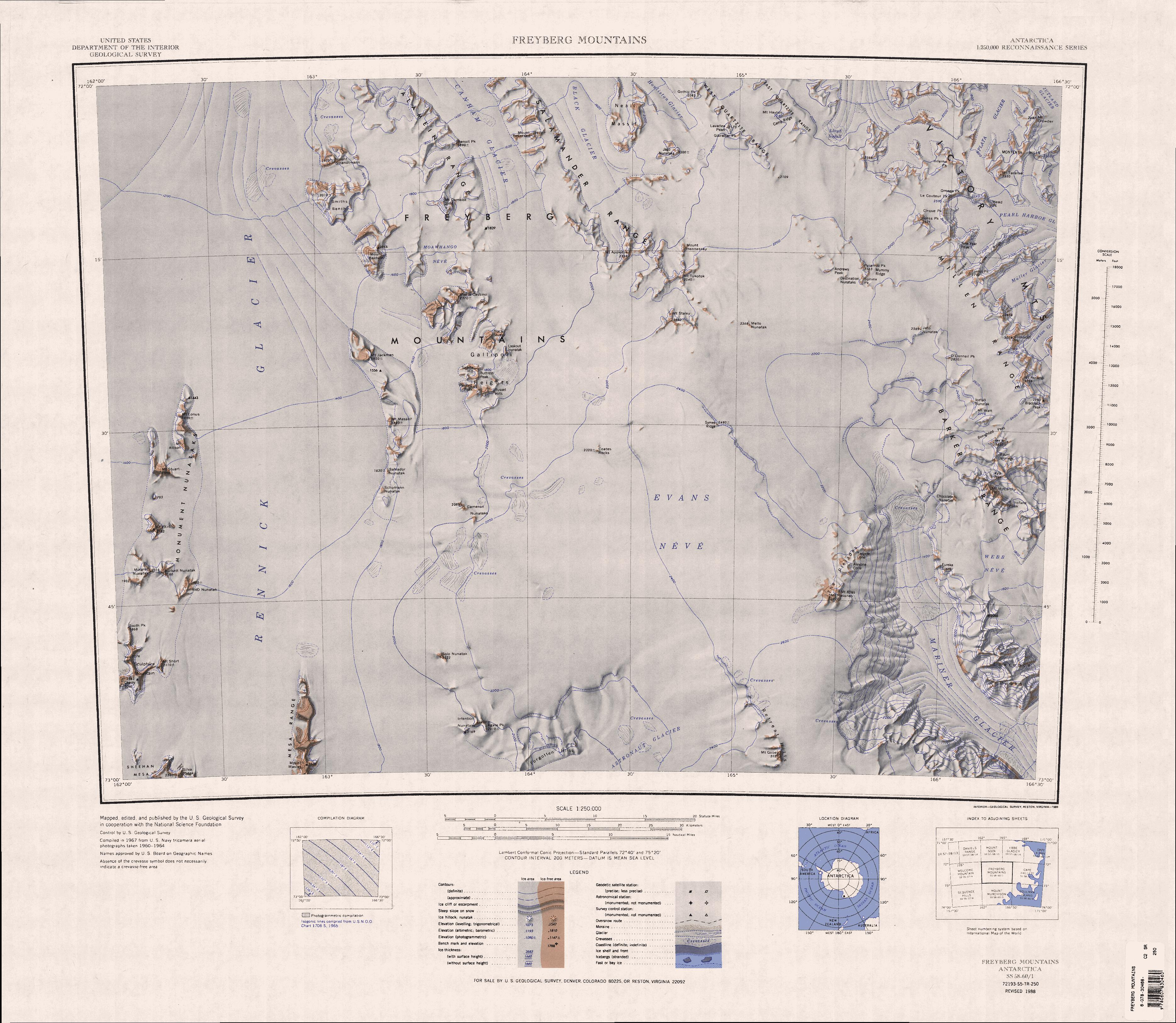
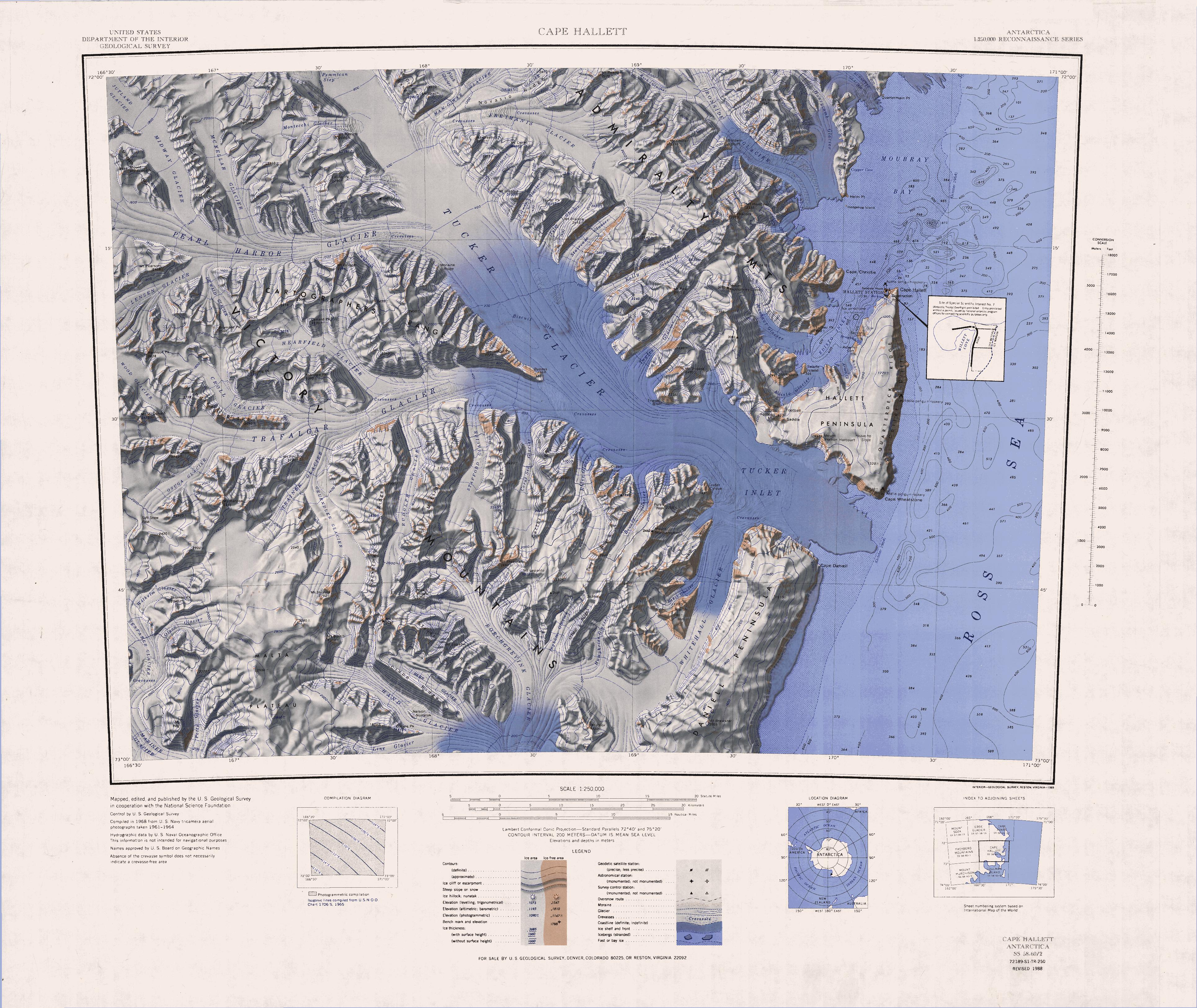
Victory Mountains in east of interior map, west of coastal map
- Tucker Glacier 72°32′S 169°15′E, a major valley glacier, about 90 nautical miles (170 km; 100 mi) long, flowing southeast between the Admiralty Mountains and the Victory Mountains to the Ross Sea. There is a snow saddle at the glacier's head, just west of Homerun Range, from which the Ebbe Glacier flows northwestward.
- Pearl Harbor Glacier 72°15′S 167°40′E, a major tributary glacier flowing generally east from the Victory Mountains and entering the southwest side of Tucker Glacier 17 nautical miles (31 km; 20 mi) northwest of Bypass Hill.
- Trafalgar Glacier 72°28′S 168°25′E, a tributary glacier about 30 nautical miles (56 km; 35 mi) long, flowing east in the Victory Mountains to join Tucker Glacier below Bypass Hill.
- Borchgrevink Glacier 73°4′S 168°30′E, a large glacier in the Victory Mountains. It drains south between Malta Plateau and Daniell Peninsula, and thence projects into Glacier Strait, Ross Sea, as a floating glacier tongue.
- Mariner Glacier 73°15′S 167°30′E, a major glacier over 60 nautical miles (110 km; 69 mi) long, descending southeast from the plateau of Victoria Land, between Mountaineer Range and Malta Plateau, and terminating at Lady Newnes Bay, Ross Sea, where it forms the floating Mariner Glacier Tongue.

== Mountain groups ==
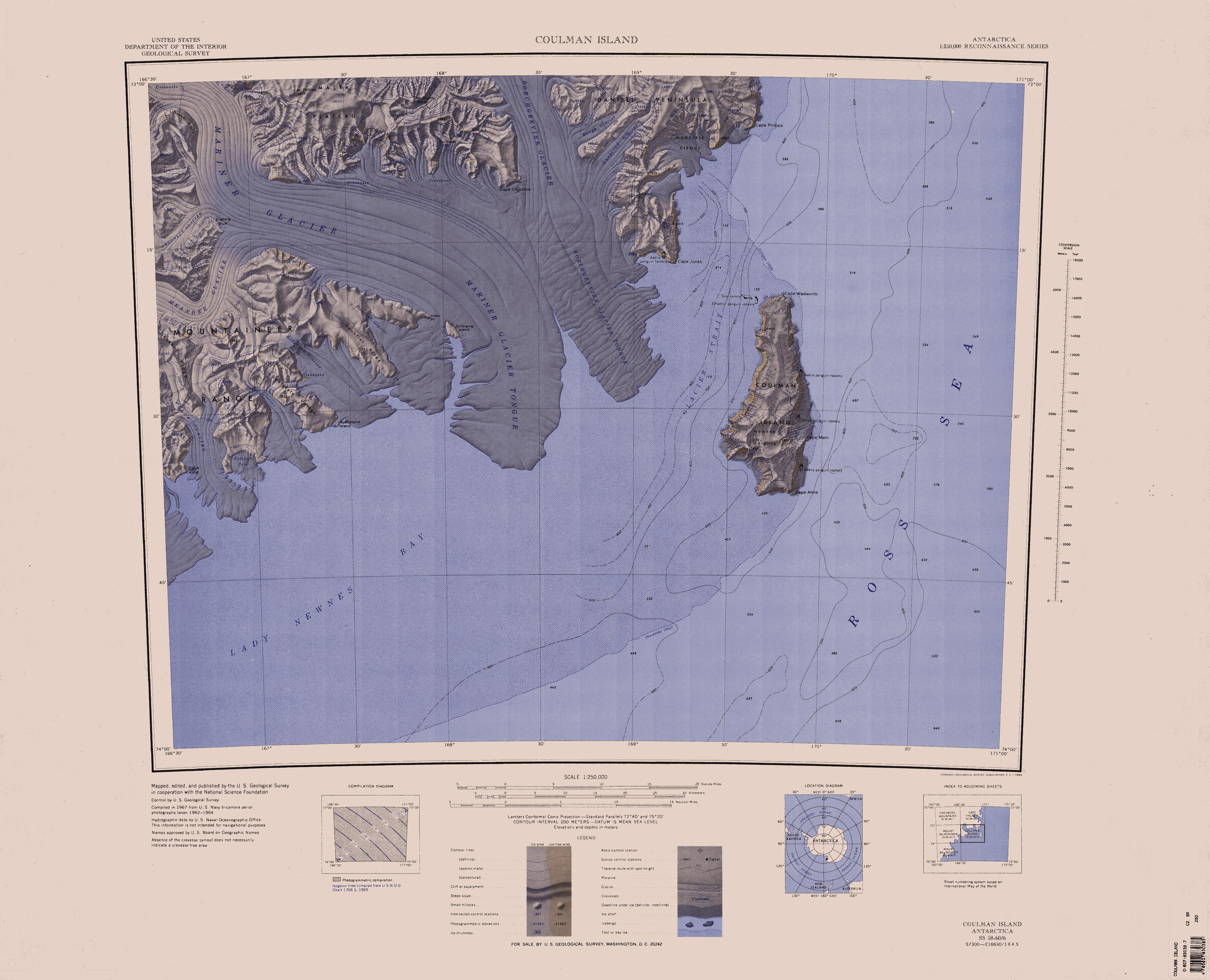
Southern Victory Mountains in north of map, above Mariner Glacier

- Monteath Hills 72°6′S 166°30′E, a group of mountains bounded by Jutland Glacier, Midway Glacier, Pearl Harbor Glacier, and Plata Glacier. The group includes Mount Crowder, Mount Tararua (2,550 metres (8,370 ft) high), and Mount Holdsworth.
- Millen Range 72°20′S 166°15′E, a prominent northwest–southeast trending mountain range, located west of the Cartographers Range.
- Barker Range 72°32′S 166°10′E, a mountain range trending northwest–southeast and including Jato Nunatak, Mount Watt, Mount McCarthy, and Mount Burton, located at the southwest side of the Millen Range.
- Saxby Range 72°4′S 167°8′E, a broad mountain range, rising to 2,450 metres (8,040 ft). It is bounded by Jutland Glacier, Tucker Glacier, Pearl Harbor Glacier, and Midway Glacier.
- Cartographers Range 72°21′S 167°50′E, a rugged range about 25 nautical miles (46 km; 29 mi) long. It is bounded on the north by Pearl Harbor Glacier, on the east by Tucker Glacier, and the south by Hearfield Glacier and Trafalgar Glacier.
- Malta Plateau 72°58′S 167°18′E, an ice-covered plateau of about 25 nautical miles (46 km; 29 mi) extent in the Victory Mountains. The plateau is irregular in shape and is bounded on the south and west by Mariner Glacier, on the north by tributaries to Trafalgar Glacier, and on the east by tributaries to Borchgrevink Glacier.

Mountains in the center of mountain groups in the east include:

- Mount Riddolls 72°48′S 167°46′E, a very prominent mountain, 3,295 metres (10,810 ft) high, situated directly at the head of Rudolph Glacier.
- Mount Freeman 72°43′S 168°21′E, a prominent mountain, 2,880 metres (9,450 ft) high, surmounting the base of Walker Ridge, 2 nautical miles (3.7 km; 2.3 mi) northwest of Mount Lepanto.

== Sources ==
- Alberts, Fred G., ed. (1995), Geographic Names of the Antarctic (PDF) (2 ed.), United States Board on Geographic Names This article incorporates public domain material from websites or documents of the United States Board on Geographic Names.
- Cape Hallet, USGS: United States Geographic Board
- Coulman Island, USGS: United States Geographic Board
- Ebbe Glacier, USGS: United States Geographic Board
- Freyberg Mountains, USGS: United States Geographic Board
- "Saxby Range", Geographic Names Information System, United States Geological Survey, United States Department of the Interior

This article incorporates public domain material from websites or documents of the United States Geological Survey.
