= Mount Freeman =

Mountain in Ross Dependency, Antarctica

- Location within Antarctica

Highest point
- Elevation: 2,880 m (9,450 ft)
- Coordinates: 72°43′S 168°21′E

Geography
- Location: Victoria Land, Antarctica
- Parent range: Victory Mountains

Mount Freeman (72°43′S 168°21′E) is a prominent mountain, 2,880 metres (9,450 ft) high, surmounting the base of Walker Ridge, 2 nautical miles (3.7 km; 2.3 mi) northwest of Mount Lepanto, in the Victory Mountains of Victoria Land, Antarctica.

== Exploration and naming ==
Mount Freeman was mapped by the United States Geological Survey (USGS) from surveys and United States Navy air photos, 1960–64. It was named by the United States Advisory Committee on Antarctic Names (US-ACAN) for Lieutenant Elliott R. Freeman, United States Navy Reserve, a helicopter aircraft commander during Operation Deep Freeze, 1968.

== Location ==
Mount Freeman is in the Victory Mountains above the Borchgrevink Glacier to the south. It is at the center of a line of mountains to the north of the Borchgrevink Glacier from which alternating ridges and glaciers extend north to the Tucker Glacier. These include, from west to east, McElroy Ridge, Stafford Glacier, Walker Ridge, Coral Sea Glacier, Mount Freeman, Carter Ridge, Mount Lepanto, Elder Glacier, Piore Ridge, Oread Spur, Bowers Glacier, O'Neal Ridge, Mount Northampton, Purvis Peak, Crater Cirque, Walsh Spur, Baker Glacier, Martin Hill and Whitehall Glacier.

== Features ==
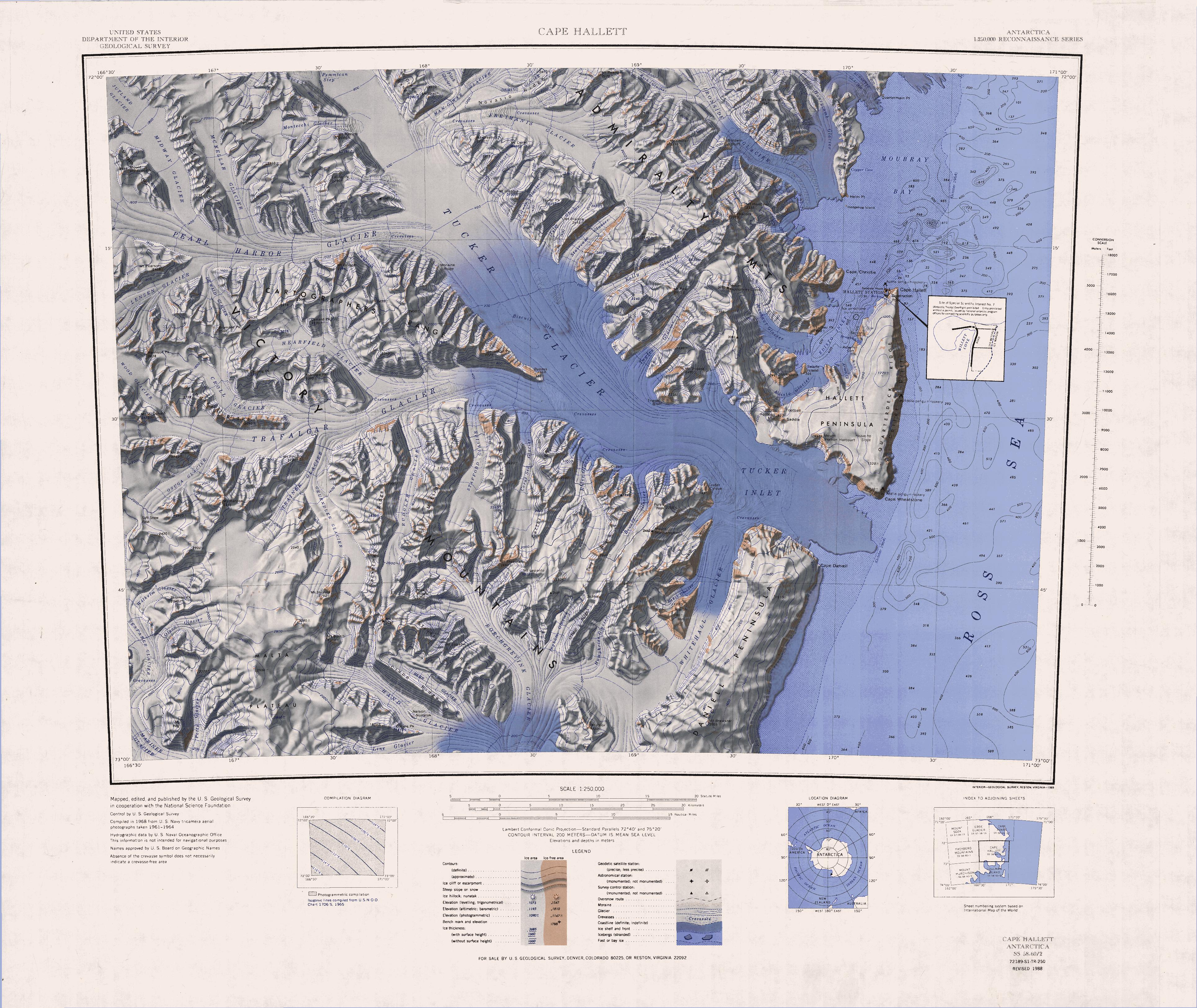
in southwest of map

=== McElroy Ridge ===
72°37′S 168°03′E. A high mountainous ridge, 16 nautical miles (30 km; 18 mi) long. (Note: Alberts (1995) says McElroy Ridge is bounded by the Gruendler Glacier, Trainer Glacier, Trafalgar Glacier and Rudolph Glacier. Judging from the map, this is a description of Hackerman Ridge. Alberts (1995) describes Hackerman Ridge as a large mountainous ridge trending north–south between the Gruendler and Rudolph Glaciers. The map shows McElroy Ridge immediately to the east of Hackerman Ridge, between Rudolf Glacier and Stafford Glacier.) Mapped in part by the New Zealand Geological Survey Antarctic Expedition (NZGSAE), 1957-58. Mapped in detail by USGS from surveys and United States Navy air photos, 1960-62. Named by US-ACAN for William D. McElroy, Director of the National Science Foundation, 1969-72.

=== Walker Ridge ===
72°34′S 168°22′E. A high mountain ridge between Stafford Glacier and Coral Sea Glacier. Mapped by USGS from surveys and United States Navy air photos, 1960-64. Named by US-ACAN for Doctor Eric A. Walker, president of Pennsylvania State University and president of the National Academy of Engineering. He was a member of the National Science Board from 1960-64 and chairman from 1964-66.

=== Carter Ridge ===
72°37′S 167°37′E. A high and mountainous ridge, 11 nautical miles (20 km; 13 mi) long, located between Coral Sea Glacier and Elder Glacier. Mapped by the NZGSAE, 1957-58, and the USGS, 1960-62. Named by US-ACAN for American chemist Herbert E. Carter, member of the National Science Board, National Science Foundation, 1964-72; chairman, 1970-72.

=== Mount Lepanto ===
72°44′S 168°27′E. A major peak, 2,910 metres (9,550 ft) high, situated 2 nautical miles (3.7 km; 2.3 mi) southeast of Mount Freeman. Named by NZGSAE, 1957-58, after the Battle of Lepanto of 1571. One of a group of associated names in this area given by NZGSAE.

=== Piore Ridge ===
72°40′S 168°55′E. A prominent ridge, 11 nautical miles (20 km; 13 mi) long, located between Elder Glacier and Bowers Glacier. Mapped by the NZGSAE, 1957-58, and the USGS, 1960-62. Named by US-ACAN for Emanuel Ruben Piore, American physicist, member of the National Science Board, National Science Foundation, 1961-72.

=== Mount Harrington ===
72°45′S 168°57′E. One of the highest peaks in the east end of the Victory Mountains, rising to 2,610 metres (8,560 ft) high on the west side of Whitehall Glacier and 5 nautical miles (9.3 km; 5.8 mi) southwest of Mount Northampton. Named in 1960 by New Zealand Antarctic Place-Names Committee (NZ-APC) after geologist Hilary J. Harrington, who led the NZGSAE in exploring this region, 1957-58, and also led NZGSAE in the McMurdo Sound region, 1958-59; United States Antarctic Research Program (USARP) investigator (with Russell J. Korsch) in the McMurdo Sound region, 1968-69.

=== Oread Spur ===
72°35′S 168°53′E. A rock spur on the south side of Tucker Glacier, 10 nautical miles (19 km; 12 mi) west of Crater Cirque, on which a survey station was placed at a height of 1,185 metres (3,888 ft) high by the NZGSAE, 1957-58. They named it Oread (mountain nymph), which is derived from Greek mythology.

=== O'Neal Ridge ===
72°48′S 168°45′E. A high ridge trending NE-SW, bounded by Ingham Glacier and Humphries Glacier. Named by US-ACAN for Russell D. O'Neal, member of the National Science Board, 1972-77. As part of his official duties in support of the United States science program, he visited several sites in Antarctica in 1975.

=== Mount Northampton ===
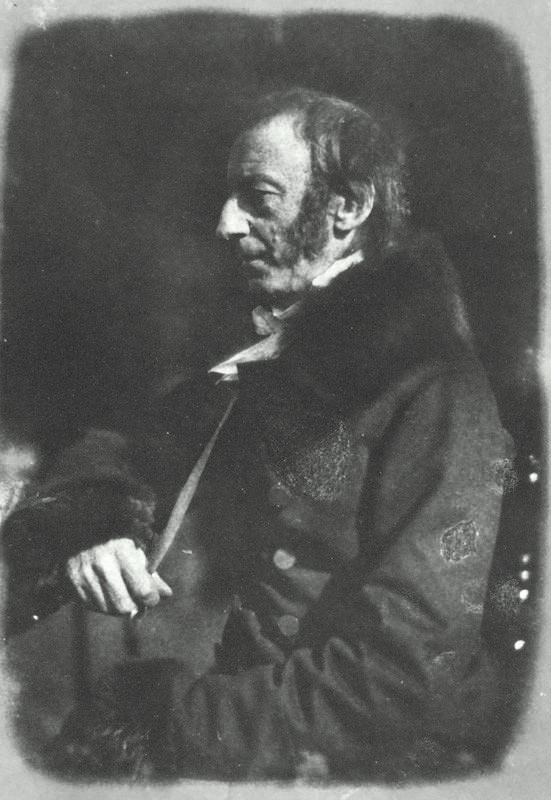
Spencer Compton, 2nd Marquess of Northampton in 1844

72°41′S 169°06′E. A mountain 2,465 metres (8,087 ft) high that rises above the central part of the ridge just east of Bowers Glacier. Discovered in January 1841 by Sir James Clark Ross, who named it for the Spencer Compton, 2nd Marquess of Northampton, then President of the Royal Society.

=== Purvis Peak ===
72°38′S 169°09′E. A peak 2,250 metres (7,380 ft) high 2 nautical miles (3.7 km; 2.3 mi) northeast of Mount Northampton. The peak overlooks the terminus of Tucker Glacier from the south. Mapped by NZGSAE, 1957-58, and the USGS, 1960-62. Named by US-ACAN for Lieutenant (later Lieutenant Commander) Ronald S. Purvis, United States Navy, of Squadron VX-6, pilot of Otter aircraft at Ellsworth Station, 1956-57, and of R5D Skymaster aircraft at McMurdo Station, 1957-58.

=== Walsh Spur ===
72°40′S 169°22′E. A pointed rock spur 4 nautical miles (7.4 km; 4.6 mi) east of Mount Northampton. The spur forms the west side of the terminus of Whitehall Glacier. First mapped from surveys by NZGSAE, 1957-58, and United States Navy aerial photography. Named by US-ACAN for Commander Don Walsh, United States Navy, special assistant to the Assistant Secretary of the Navy for Research and Development, 1971-72. In 1960, with Jacques Piccard, Walsh descended to the bottom of the Mariana Trench in the Trieste.

=== Martin Hill ===
72°48′S 169°14′E. A conspicuous ice-free hill at the west side of Whitehall Glacier. Mapped by USGS from surveys and United States Navy air photos, 1960-62. Named by US-ACAN for P.J. Martin, New Zealand senior scientist at Hallett Station, 1961.

== Sources ==
- Alberts, Fred G., ed. (1995), Geographic Names of the Antarctic (PDF) (2 ed.), United States Board on Geographic Names This article incorporates public domain material from websites or documents of the United States Board on Geographic Names.
- Cape Hallet, USGS: United States Geographic Board

This article incorporates public domain material from websites or documents of the United States Geological Survey.
