= Coulman Island =

Island in Ross Dependency, Antarctica

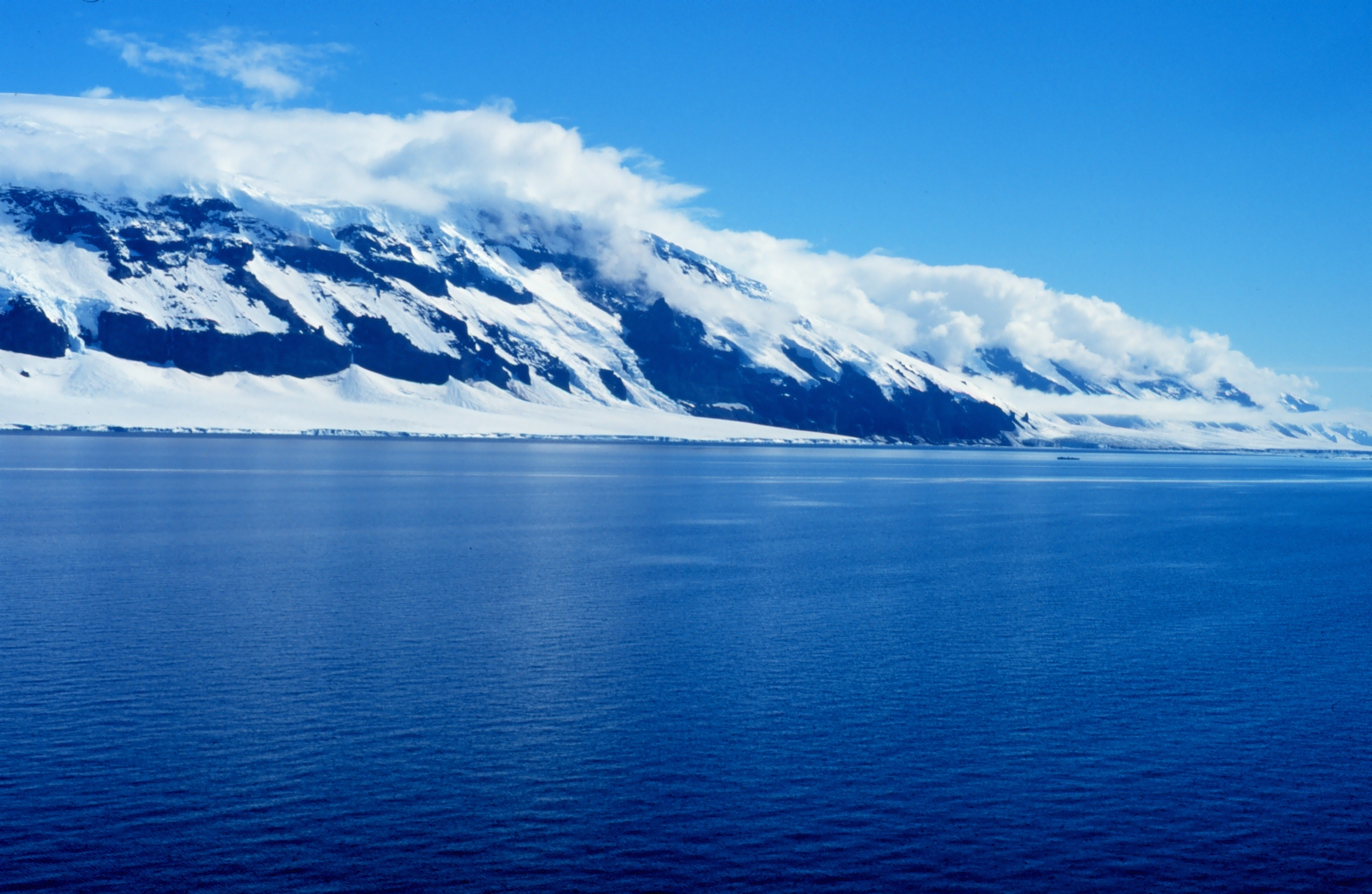

- Location within Antarctica

Geography
- Location: Antarctica
- Coordinates: 73°29′S 169°45′E
- Area: 319 km^{2} (123 sq mi)
- Length: 33.3 km (20.69 mi)
- Width: 14.8 km (9.2 mi)
- Highest elevation: 6,562 ft (2000.1 m)
- Highest point: Hawkes Heights

Administration
- Administered under the Antarctic Treaty System

Demographics
- Population: Uninhabited

Coulman Island (73°28′S 169°45′E) is an island 18 nautical miles (33 km; 21 mi) long and 8 nautical miles (15 km; 9.2 mi) wide, lying 9 nautical miles (17 km; 10 mi) southeast of Cape Jones, Victoria Land, Antarctica, in the western Ross Sea. It was discovered in 1841 by Sir James Clark Ross who named it for his father-in-law, Thomas Coulman.

== Geology ==
The island is composed of several overlapping shield volcanoes that form part of the Hallett Volcanic Province of the McMurdo Volcanic Group. A 5 km (3.1 mi) wide and 700 m (2,300 ft) deep caldera called the Hawkes Heights can be found on the south end of the island.

== Important Bird Area (IBA) ==
The island is currently recognized as an important bird area because it holds a huge super-colony of emperor penguins and is the largest colony of this species in the world. However, scientists speculate that this colony could hold more birds than what they have estimated. More than 26,000 chicks have been counted during the 2018-2019 breeding season indicating that the number of adults ranged from 30,000 to 35,000 breeding pairs. The sheer numbers of penguins on the island had also led scientists to think that there have been potentially larger emperor penguin super-colonies that may have existed in the past before being wiped out during the last ice age.

== Geography ==
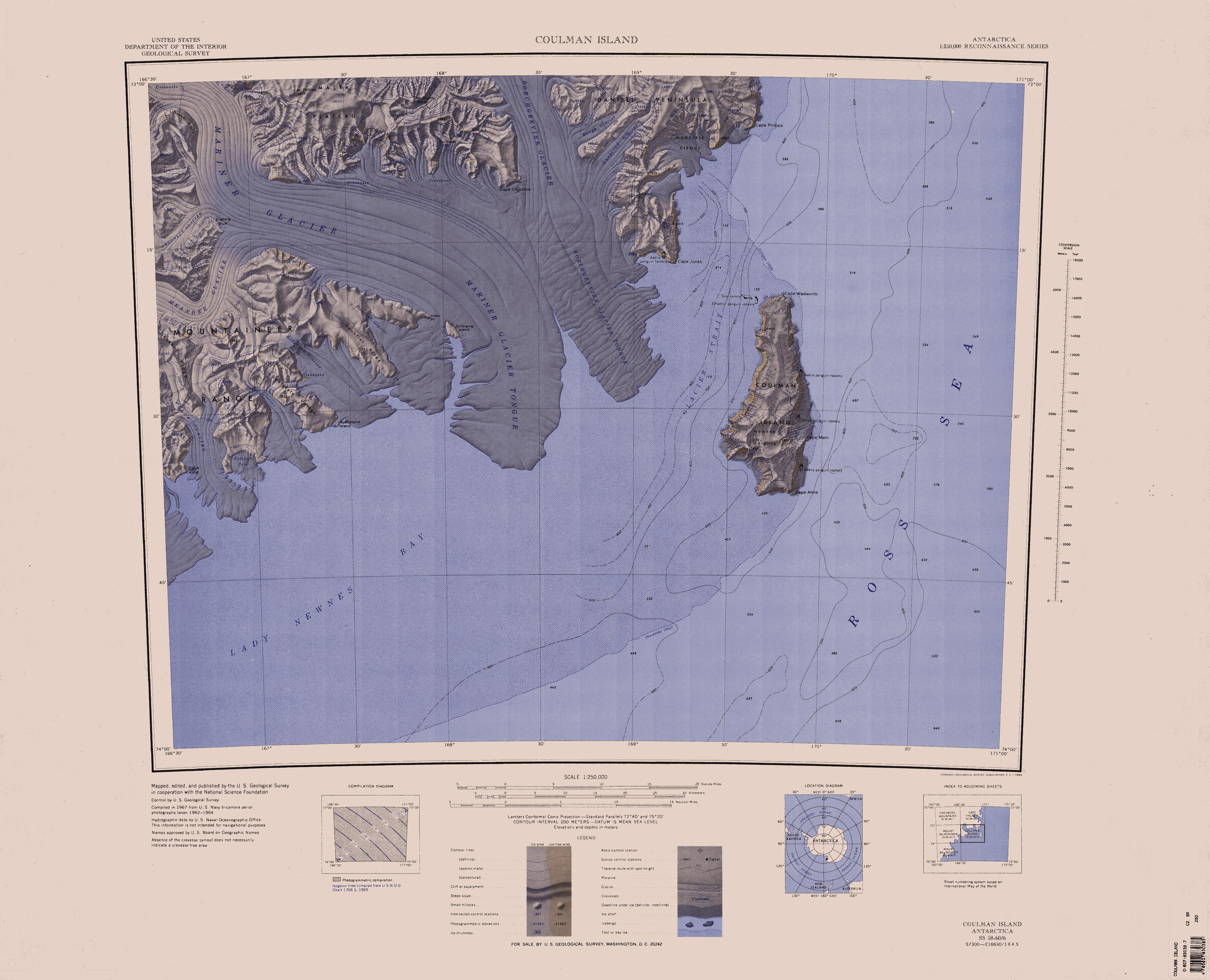
Coulman Island to east of map

Coulman Island is in the Ross Sea to the southeast of Daniell Peninsula, and east of the ice tongues of Borchgrevink Glacier and Mariner Glacier, which extend into Lady Newnes Bay to the southwest of the island. Glacier Strait separates the island from the mainland. Hawkes Heights dominates the south of the island. Capes on the east side are, from north to south, Cape Wadworth, Cape Main and Cape Anne.

== Features ==
=== Hawkes Heights ===
73°32′S 169°42′E. The heights are an ice-filled crater rising to 2,000 metres (6,600 ft) high that dominates the south part of Coulman Island and marks the island's summit. Named by NZGSAE, 1958-59, for Captain William M. Hawkes, United States Navy, who took a leading part in early air operations from Williams Field near McMurdo Station, including long range photo reconnaissance and supply flights, and the first air landing at the South Pole. He was commander of one of the two planes which made the historic first flight from Christchurch to McMurdo Sound on Dec. 17, 1955. His air photos proved of great value to two NZGSAE parties to this part of Victoria Land.

=== Cape Wadworth ===
73°19′S 169°47′E. The northern extremity of Coulman Island. Discovered Jan. 17, 1841 by Sir James Clark Ross who named it in compliment to his wife's uncle, Robert John Coulman, Esq., of Wadworth Hall, Doncaster.

=== Cape Main ===
73°33′S 169°54′E. A small cape situated 5 nautical miles (9.3 km; 5.8 mi) north of Cape Anne, along the east side of Coulman Island. Named by NZ-APC in 1966 for Brian Main, scientific technician at Hallett Station, 1962-63.

=== Cape Anne ===
73°37′S 169°51′E. Cape which marks the southeast extremity of Coulman Island. Discovered in January 1841 by Sir James Clark Ross and named by him for his wife.

=== Glacier Strait ===
73°25′S 169°24′E. A north-south trending strait off the coast of Victoria Land in the western Ross Sea, situated between Coulman Island on the east and Cape Jones, Borchgrevink Glacier Tongue and Mariner Glacier Tongue on the west. The name honors the USS Glacier which in February 1965 was the first vessel to navigate the strait, and is also in conjunction with the significant presence of the two large glacier tongues. The name was proposed by M.R.J. Ford, New Zealand surveyor who was aboard the Glacier in February 1965.

== See also ==
- List of Antarctic islands south of 60° S

== Sources ==
- Alberts, Fred G., ed. (1995), Geographic Names of the Antarctic (PDF) (2 ed.), United States Board on Geographic Names This article incorporates public domain material from websites or documents of the United States Board on Geographic Names.
- Coulman Island, USGS: United States Geological Survey

This article incorporates public domain material from websites or documents of the United States Geological Survey.
