= Mariner Glacier =

Glacier in Antarctica

- Location within Antarctica
- Location: Victoria Land
- Coordinates: 73°15′S 167°30′E
- Terminus: Ross Sea

The Mariner Glacier (73°15′S 167°30′E) is a major glacier over 60 nautical miles (110 km; 69 mi) long, descending southeast from the plateau of Victoria Land, Antarctica, between Mountaineer Range and Malta Plateau, and terminating at Lady Newnes Bay, Ross Sea, where it forms the floating Mariner Glacier Tongue.

== Exploration and naming ==
The lower reaches and entrance to the Mariner Glacier valley were reconnoitered in December 1958 by Captain John Cadwalader, United States Navy, and two members of New Zealand Geological Survey Antarctic Expedition (NZGSAE), in a flight from the icebreakers USS Glacier and USS Staten Island which were lying close off the south end of Coulman Island, in an attempt to land expedition members on the mainland. Named by NZGSAE, 1958–59, as a tribute to the work of mariners in Antarctic research and exploration.

== Geography ==
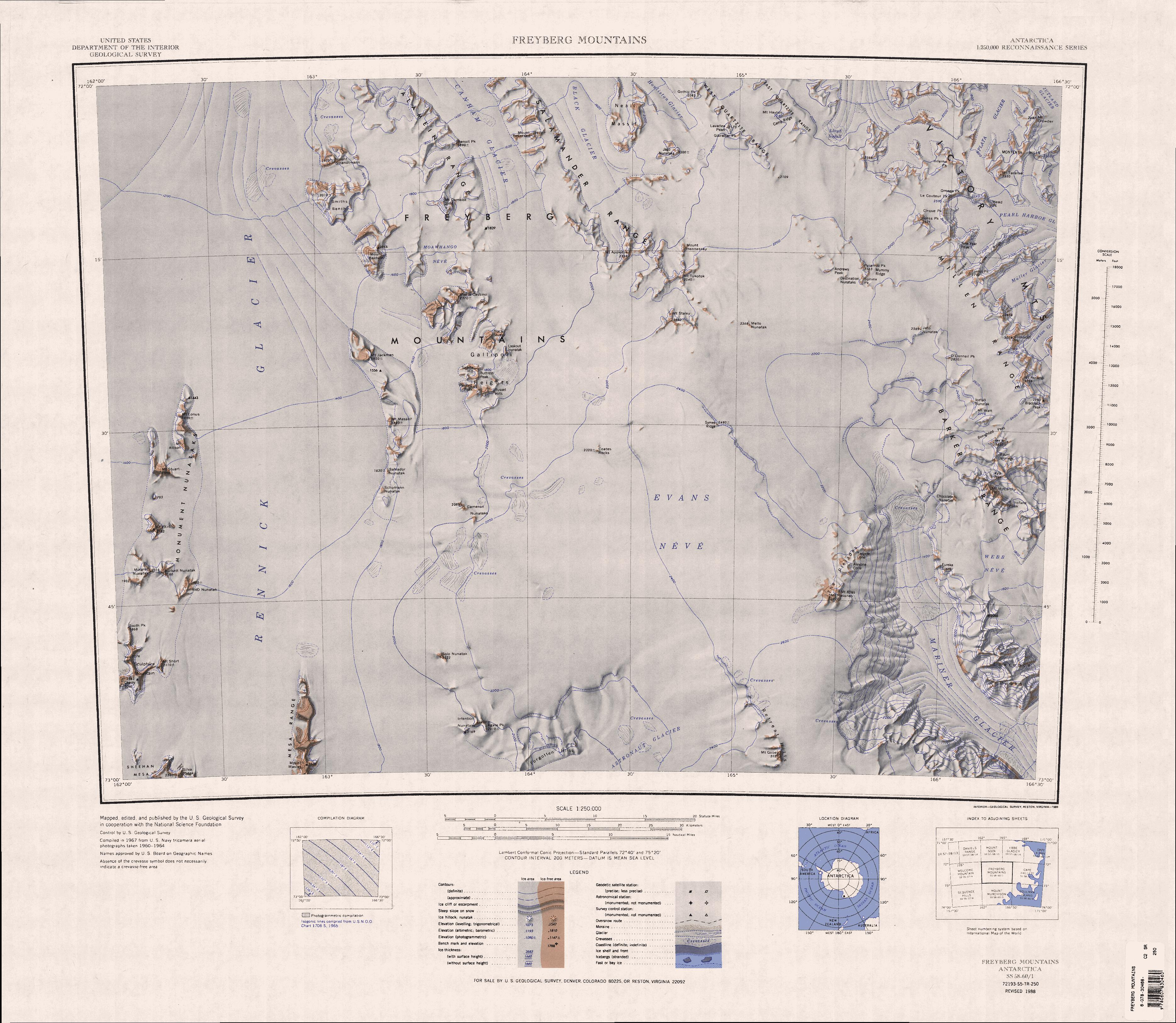
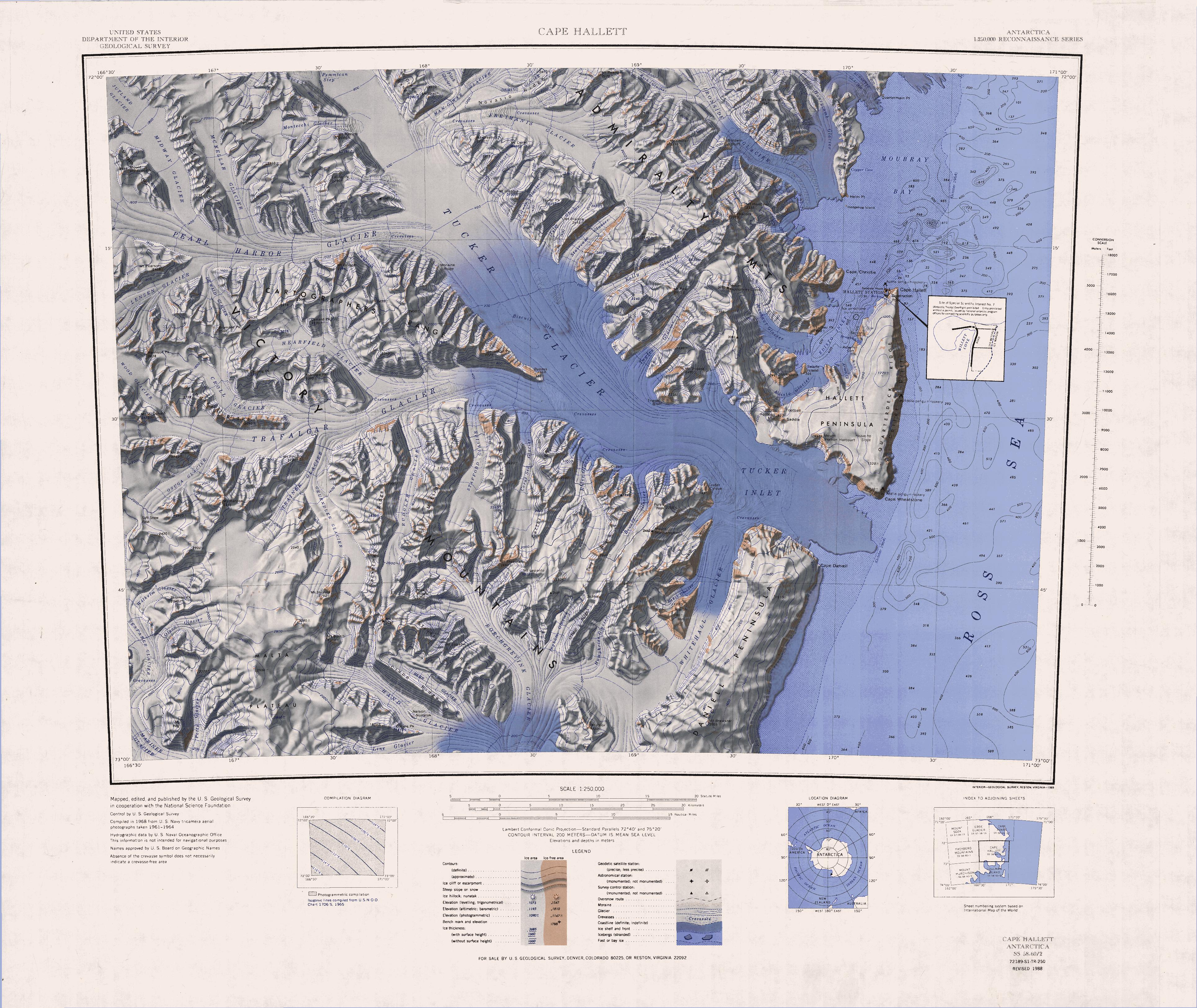
Upper section. Glacier flow from southeast corner of left map.
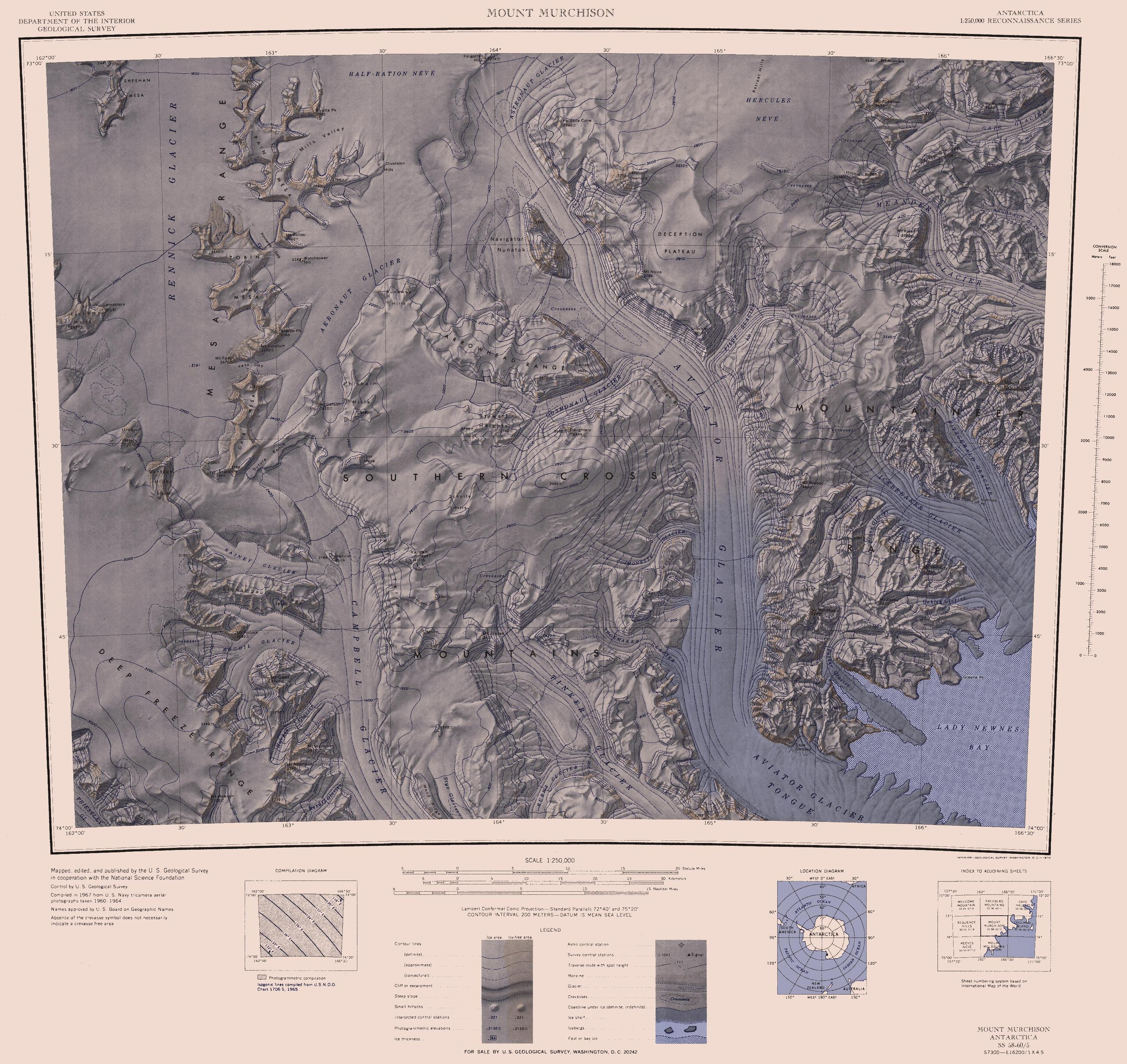
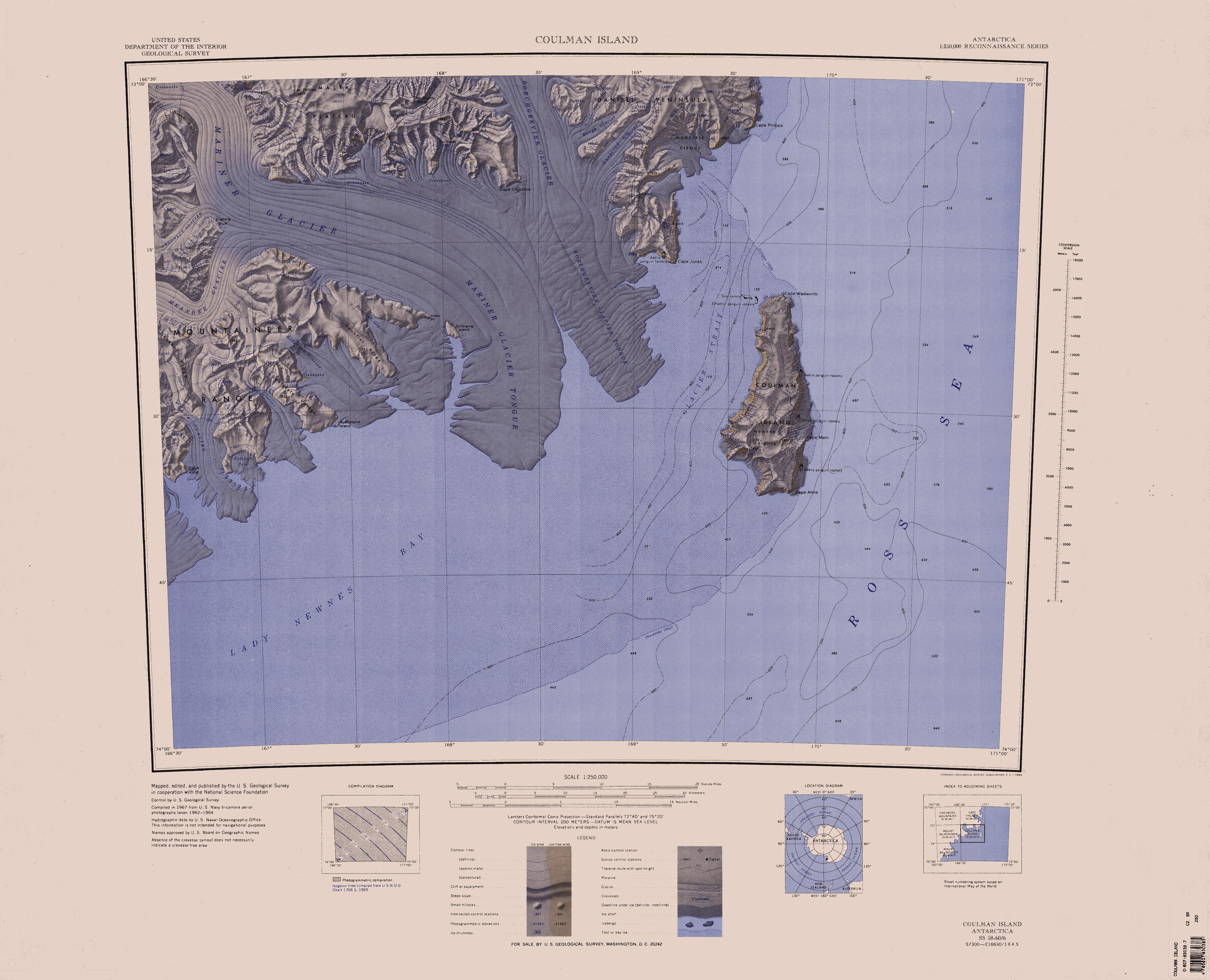
Lower section. Glacier terminates in northwest corner of right map

The Mariner Glacier forms in the Victory Mountains between The Pleiades to the east and the Barker Range to the west. It is below the Evans Névé to the northwest and the Webb Névé to the east. To the south of the Lawrence Peaks it is fed from the east by the Seafarer Glacier, which in turn is fed by the Wilhelm Glacier and the Olson Glacier. Flowing southeast, below Mount Heg it is fed from the north by the Potts Glacier.

Gair Glacier enters from the west to the north of Bunker Bluff, and Argonaut Glacier enters from the southwest before Engberg Bluff. The Meander Glacier enters from the south after Engberg Bluff. The Meander Glacier forms below the Hercules Névé, forming on both sides of Hobbie Ridge. Before its mouth between Cape Crossfire and Index Point the Mariner Glacier receives the small Boyer Glacier from the south. At its mouth, past Emerging Island, the glacier forms the Mariner Glacier Tongue, which abuts the Borchgrevink Glacier Tongue flowing into Lady Newnes Bay.

== Left tributaries ==
Tributaries from the left (northeast) include,

=== Seafarer Glacier ===
72°54′S 166°34′E. A tributary glacier draining southward from Webb Névé between the Lawrence Peaks and Malta Plateau, to enter Mariner Glacier. So named by the Mariner Glacier party of NZGSAE, 1966–67, in association with the name Mariner. Named after The Seafarer, an Anglo Saxon poem celebrating early harsh navigation.

=== Wilhelm Glacier ===
72°46′S 166°37′E. A glacier 2 nautical miles (3.7 km; 2.3 mi) north of Olson Glacier, draining the north part of the west slopes of Malta Plateau and flowing west into Seafarer Glacier. Mapped by the United States Geological Survey (USGS) from surveys and United States Navy air photos, 1960–64. Named by the United States Advisory Committee on Antarctic Names (US-ACAN) for Robert C. Wilhelm, a member of the United States Antarctic Research Program (USARP) glaciological party at Roosevelt Island in 1967–68.

=== Olson Glacier ===
72°49′S 166°41′E. A tributary glacier descending westward from Malta Plateau to enter Seafarer Glacier in the Victory Mountains. Mapped by USGS from surveys and United States Navy air photos, 1960–62. Named by US-ACAN for Richard D. Olson of the Office of Antarctic Programs, National Science Foundation, who participated in research administration activities at McMurdo Station, 1967–68.

=== Potts Glacier ===
72°58′S 166°50′E. A steep glacier draining from the west slopes of Malta Plateau and flowing south to enter Mariner Glacier. Mapped by USGS from surveys and United States Navy air photos, 1960–64. Named by US-ACAN for Donald C. Potts, biologist at McMurdo Station, 1966–67.

== Right tributaries ==
Tributaries from the left (southwest ) include,

=== Gair Glacier ===
73°03′S 166°32′E. A tributary glacier, 10 nautical miles (19 km; 12 mi) long, rising close southeast of Mount Supernal in the Mountaineer Range and flowing east-northeast to enter Mariner Glacier just north of Bunker Bluff. Named by the New Zealand Geological Survey Antarctic Expedition (NZGSAE) 1962–63, for Harry Gair, geologist and leader that season of the NZGSAE northern field party.

=== Argonaut Glacier ===
73°13′S 166°42′E. A tributary glacier about 10 nautical miles (19 km; 12 mi) long in the Mountaineer Range. It flows east to enter Mariner Glacier just north of Engberg Bluff. Named by NZGSAE, 1962–63, in association with Aeronaut Glacier, Cosmonaut Glacier and Cosmonette Glacier.

=== Meander Glacier ===
73°16′S 166°55′E. A large meandering tributary to the Mariner Glacier. The glacier emerges in the vicinity of Mount Supernal and Hobbie Ridge and drains generally eastward for 30 nautical miles (56 km; 35 mi) through the Mountaineer Range to join Mariner Glacier just east of Engberg Bluff. The descriptive name was given by the NZGSAE, 1962–63.

=== Boyer Glacier ===
73°18′S 167°21′E. Short tributary glacier situated 10 nautical miles (19 km; 12 mi) west of Index Point in the east part of Mountaineer Range. It flows north into lower Mariner Glacier, Victoria Land. Mapped by USGS from surveys and United States Navy air photos, 1960–64. Named by US-ACAN for Jack W. Boyer, United States Navy, radioman at Hallett Station, 1962.

== Other features ==
=== Webb Névé ===
72°42′S 166°18′E. The névé at the head of Seafarer Glacier in Victoria Land. Named by the Northern Party of NZGSAE, 1966–67, after the appointed Public Relations Officer Dexter Webb, who was killed before taking up the appointment.

=== Chocolate Nunatak ===
72°36′S 166°03′E. An isolated nunatak of red-brown color at the east side of the head of Mariner Glacier, 3 nautical miles (5.6 km; 3.5 mi) west-southwest of Mount McCarthy, Barker Range. A descriptive name apparently applied by B.W. Riddolls and G.T. Hancox, geologists with the NZARP Northern Party to upper Mariner Glacier, 1966–67.

=== Eureka Spurs ===
72°42′S 166°00′E. Several rock spurs exposed along the east side of the head of Mariner Glacier, 8 nautical miles (15 km; 9.2 mi) southwest of Mount McCarthy, in Victoria Land. So named by the VUWAE field party to Evans Névé, 1971–72, on the occasion of fossil discoveries made in the area.

=== Lawrence Peaks ===
72°50′S 166°20′E. A mountain complex of high peaks separating the Seafarer Glacier from the head of the Mariner Glacier. Named by the Northern Party of NZGSAE, 1966–67, for the leader of the party, J.E.S. Lawrence.

=== Hercules Névé ===
73°04′S 165°15′E. A névé at the north margin of Mountaineer Range. It is bounded by Deception Plateau, Astronaut Glacier, Retreat Hills, and by such western tributaries to the Mariner Glacier as Meander Glacier and Gair Glacier. Named by the northern party of NZGSAE, 1966–67, in appreciation of the party's transport into the field by United States Navy C-130 Hercules aircraft, also as an indication to future parties of a possible C-130 landing place.

=== Hobbie Ridge ===
73°09′S 165°41′E. A bold ridge that projects from the middle of the head of Meander Glacier, 5 nautical miles (9.3 km; 5.8 mi) south of Mount Supernal. Mapped by USGS from surveys and United States Navy air photos, 1960–64. Named by US-ACAN for John E. Hobbie, biologist at McMurdo Station 1962–63.

=== Bunker Bluff ===
73°04′S 166°40′E. A notable bluff that stands just south of the mouth of Gair Glacier and forms a part of the west wall of Mariner Glacier. Mapped by USGS from surveys and United States Navy air photos, 1960–64. Named by US-ACAN for William H. Bunker, meteorologist at Hallett Station, 1962.

=== Engberg Bluff ===
73°13′S 166°48′E. Bold ice-covered bluff between the mouths of the Argonaut and Meander Glaciers at the point where these tributaries enter the south part of Mariner Glacier. Mapped by USGS from surveys and United States Navy air photos, 1960–64. Named by US-ACAN for Larry W. Engberg, meteorologist at Hallett Station, 1961.

=== Index Point ===
73°21′S 167°55′E. A low, ice-covered point that forms the east extremity of the Mountaineer Range on the coast of Victoria Land. The feature lies at the terminus of Mariner Glacier, 1.5 nautical miles (2.8 km; 1.7 mi) west of Emerging Island. So named in 1966 by the New Zealand Antarctic Place-Names Committee (NZ-APC) because the shape is suggestive of an index finger.

=== Emerging Island ===
73°23′S 168°02′E. An ice-covered island 2 nautical miles (3.7 km; 2.3 mi) long, lying 1.5 nautical miles (2.8 km; 1.7 mi) east of Index Point, Victoria Land, in the north part of Lady Newnes Bay. The feature appears to be barely emerging above the ice at the terminus of Mariner Glacier. Named in 1966 by the NZ-APC.

=== Mariner Glacier Tongue ===
73°27′S 168°20′E. The broad seaward extension of the Mariner Glacier. The feature is just west of and abuts the Borchgrevink Glacier Tongue where it discharges into Lady Newnes Bay. Named in association with Mariner Glacier.

== Sources ==
- Alberts, Fred G., ed. (1995), Geographic Names of the Antarctic (PDF) (2 ed.), United States Board on Geographic Names This article incorporates public domain material from websites or documents of the United States Board on Geographic Names.
- Cape Hallet, USGS: United States Geological Survey
- Coulman Island, USGS: United States Geological Survey
- Freyberg Mountains, USGS: United States Geological Survey
- Mount Murchison, USGS: United States Geological Survey

This article incorporates public domain material from websites or documents of the United States Geological Survey.
