= Malta Plateau =

Ice-covered plateau in the Victory Mountains, Victoria Land, Antarctica

- Location within Antarctica

Highest point
- Elevation: 2,320 m (7,610 ft)
- Coordinates: 72°58′S 167°18′E

Geography
- Location: Victoria Land, Antarctica
- Parent range: Victory Mountains

The Malta Plateau (72°58′S 167°18′E) is an ice-covered plateau of about 25 nautical miles (46 km; 29 mi) extent in the Victory Mountains of Victoria Land, Antarctica. The plateau is irregular in shape and is bounded on the south and west by Mariner Glacier, on the north by tributaries to Trafalgar Glacier, and on the east by tributaries to Borchgrevink Glacier.

== Name ==
The Malta Plateau was named by the New Zealand Antarctic Place-Names Committee (NZ-APC) to commemorate the island of Malta in association with the Victory Mountains.

== Geology ==
The plateau is part of the Melbourne Volcanic Province of the McMurdo Volcanic Group.

== Location ==
The Malta Plateau is to the south of the Trafalgar Glacier, to the east and north of the Seafarer Glacier and the Mariner Glacier, and to the west of the Borchgrevink Glacier. The west of the plateau is drained by Potts Glacier to the south, Olson Glacier and Wilhelm Glacier to the west, Osuga Glacier and Trainer Glacier to the north. Features of the west include Mount Heg, Thomas Peak, Soft Snow Pass, Mount Hancox and Mount Finch.

The east of the plateau is drained by the Line Glacier, Hand Glacier and Behr Glacier, which feed the Borchgrevink Glacier to the west, and by the Gruendler Glacier and Rudolph Glacier to the north, which feed the Trafalgar Glacier. Features of the east include Collins Peak, Mount Burrill and Mount Hussey. Features of the south of the plateau include Mount Philipps, Cuneiform Cliffs, Mount Alberts, Tur Peak and Cape Crossfire.

== Western features ==
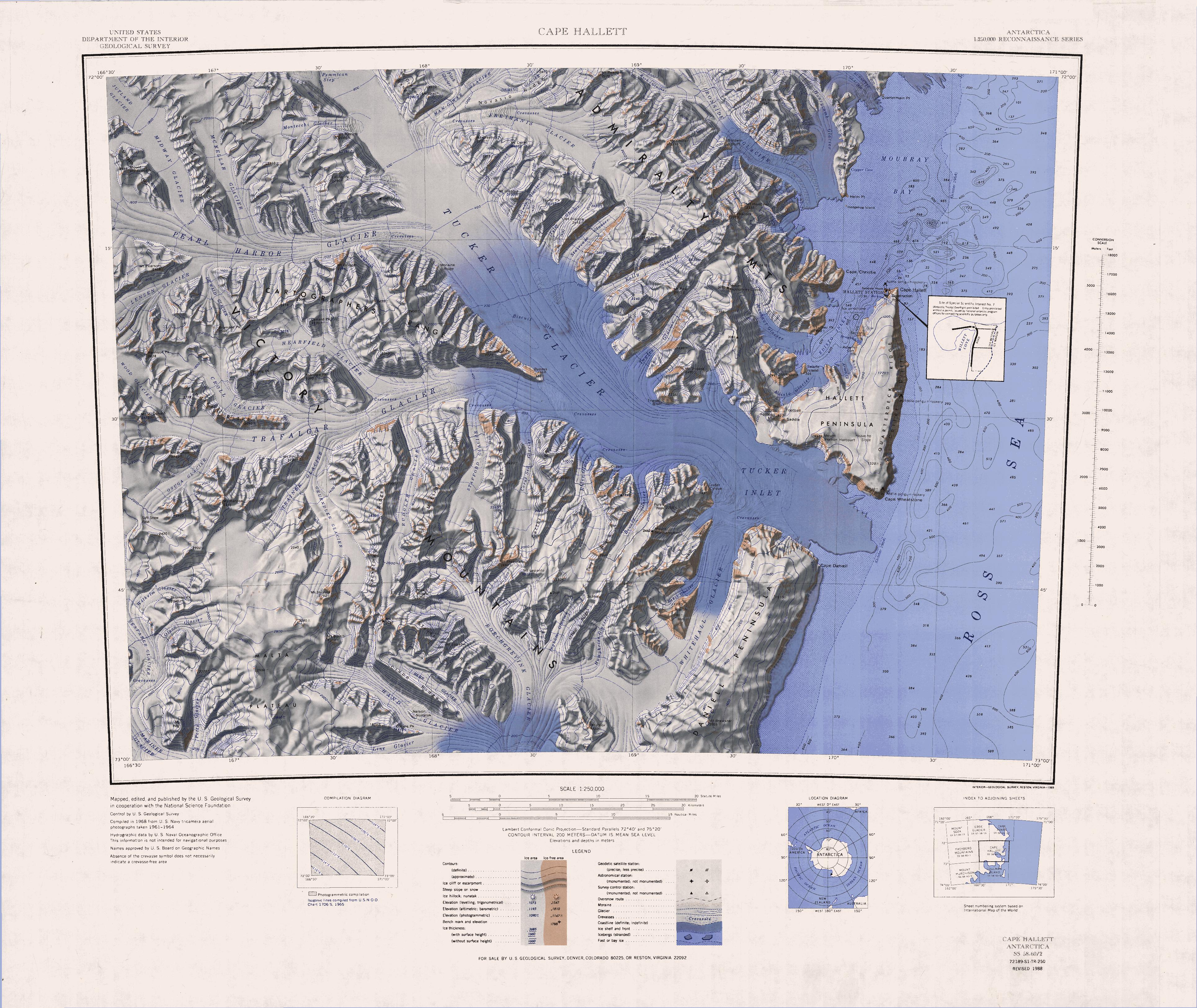
North of plateau Peak in southwest of map

=== Mount Heg ===
72°57′S 166°45′E. A massive ice-covered mountain forming the south end of a promontory on the west side of Malta Plateau. It is bounded on the west, south and east sides by the Seafarer Glacier, Mariner Glacier and Potts Glacier. The mountain first appears on a 1960 New Zealand map compiled from United States Navy aerial photographs. Named by the United States Advisory Committee on Antarctic Names (US-ACAN) in 1972 for James E. Heg, Chief of the Polar Planning and Coordination Staff in the Office of Polar Programs, National Science Foundation.

=== Thomas Peak ===
72°46′S 166°43′E. A peak 2,040 metres (6,690 ft) high at the west side of Malta Plateau, situated on the ridge between Wilhelm and Olson Glaciers. Mapped by the United States Geological Survey (USGS) from surveys and United States Navy air photos, 1960-64. Named by the US-ACAN for Francis J. Thomas, biologist at McMurdo Station, 1962-63 and 1964-65.

=== Soft Snow Pass ===
72°37′S 166°34′E. A snow pass at about 2,000 metres (6,600 ft) high at the head of Osuga Glacier, a tributary of Trafalgar Glacier. So named by the New Zealand Antarctic Research Programme (NZARP) geological party led by M.G. Laird, 1981-82, from the unusually soft snow encountered in the pass.

=== Mount Hancox ===
72°38′S 166°59′E. A prominent mountain 3,245 metres (10,646 ft) high about 6 nautical miles (11 km; 6.9 mi) southeast of Mount Burton, rising above the north margin of Malta Plateau. Named by the Mariner Glacier geology party of NZGSAE, 1966-67, for G.T. Hancox, senior geologist with the party in this area.

=== Mount Finch ===
72°34′S 167°23′E. A mountain 2,100 metres (6,900 ft) high standing at the west side of the mouth of Trainer Glacier where the latter enters Trafalgar Glacier. Mapped by USGS from surveys and United States Navy air photos, 1960-64. Named by US-ACAN for Lieutenant Jerry L. Finch, United States Navy, Squadron VX-6 project officer for infrared ice sounding equipment and an aircraft commander in Operation Deep Freeze, 1968.

== Eastern features ==
=== Collins Peak ===
72°58′S 167°49′E. A small but noteworthy peak 1,810 metres (5,940 ft) high at the east side of Malta Plateau, on the end of the ridge overlooking the confluence of the Hand and Line Glaciers. Mapped by USGS from surveys and United States Navy air photos, 1960-64. Named by US-ACAN for Eric J. Collins, biologist at Hallett Station, 1965-66.

=== Mount Burrill ===
72°50′S 167°29′E. A mountain 2,310 metres (7,580 ft) high on the east edge of Malta Plateau, situated 4 nautical miles (7.4 km; 4.6 mi) south of Mount Hussey at the head of Hand Glacier. Named by the New Zealand Antarctic Place-Names Committee (NZ-APC) for Doctor Meredith F. Burrill, Executive Secretary of the United States Board on Geographic Names, 1943-73. His leadership in the development of Antarctic names policy and principles has been instrumental in establishing greater international uniformity in the geographic nomenclature of the continent.

=== Mount Hussey ===
72°46′S 167°31′E. A mountain 2,790 metres (9,150 ft) high rising from the spur at the head of Gruendler Glacier. Mapped by USGS from surveys and United States Navy air photos, 1960-64. Named by US-ACAN for Keith M. Hussey, geologist at McMurdo Station, 1966-67.

== Southern features ==
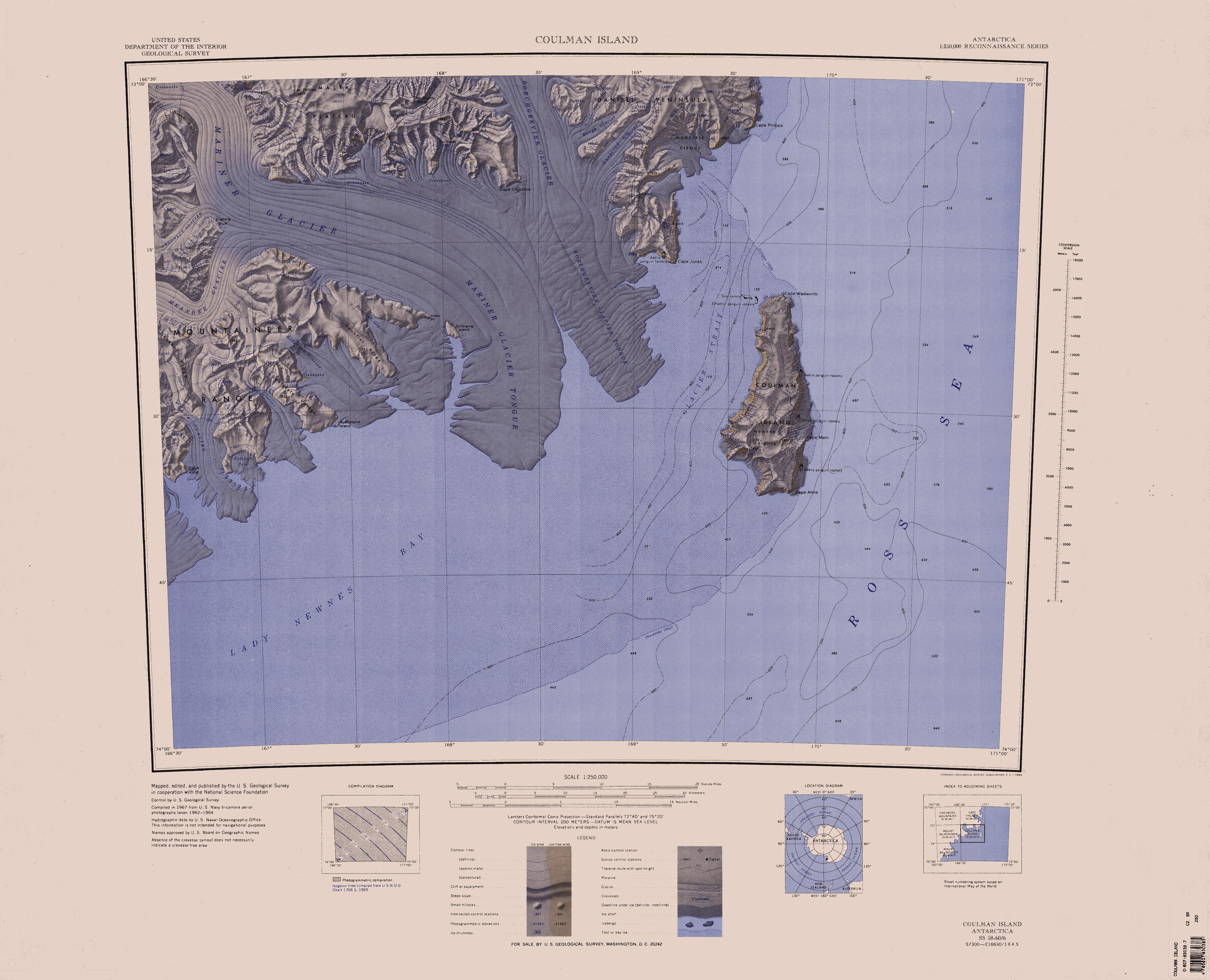
South of plateau in northwest of map

=== Mount Philipps ===
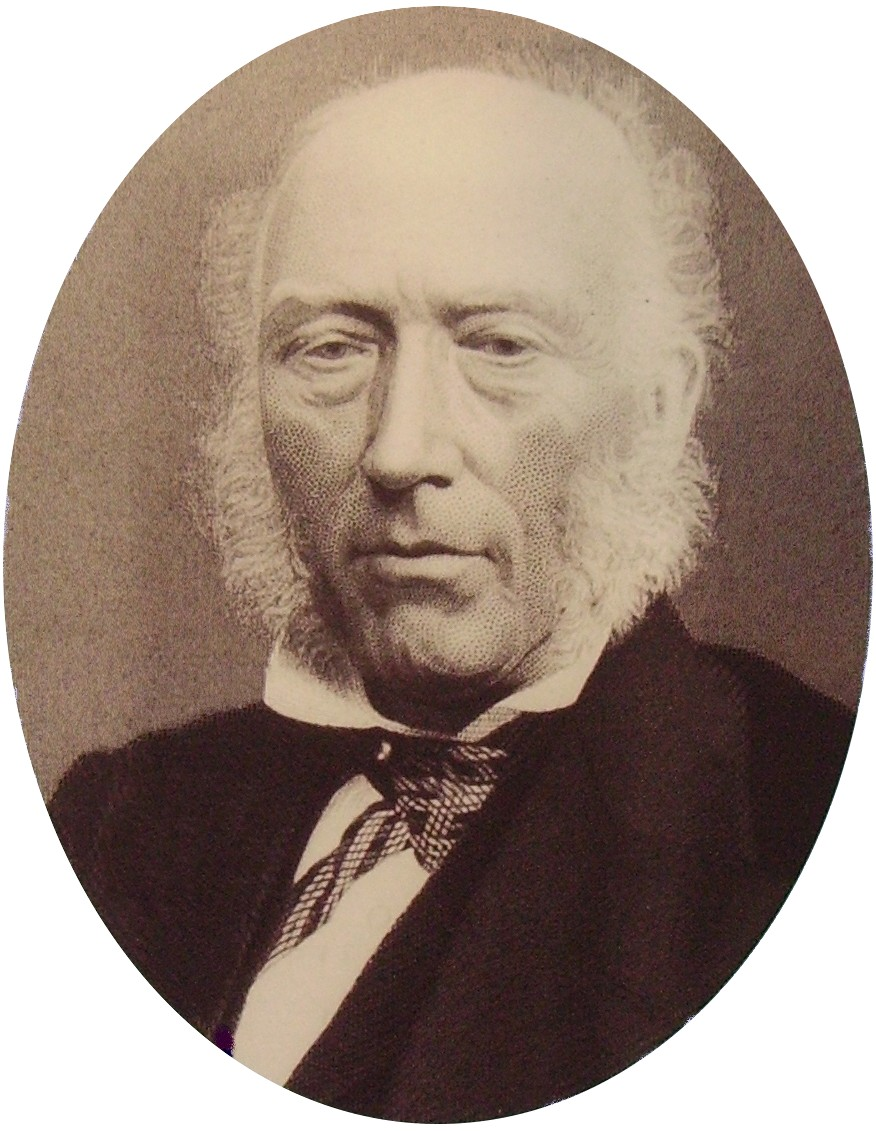
John Phillips

73°01′S 167°15′E. The culminating summit 3,035 metres (9,957 ft) high in the south part of the ice-covered Malta Plateau. Discovered in January 1841 by Sir James Clark Ross who named it for Professor John Phillips, assistant secretary of the British Association.

=== Cuneiform Cliffs ===
73°06′S 167°38′E. Steep, irregular cliffs at the south end of Malta Plateau, along the north side of the lower Mariner Glacier. The name applied by NZ-APC in 1966 is descriptive of wedgelike spurs that project from the face of the cliffs.

=== Mount Alberts ===
73°02′S 167°52′E. A pointed, almost completely snow-covered mountain 2,320 metres (7,610 ft) high situated 11 nautical miles (20 km; 13 mi) east of Mount Phillips on the east margin of Malta Plateau. The mountain stands immediately south of the terminus of Line Glacier and overlooks the west margin of Ross Sea. Named by the New Zealand Geographic Board in 1966 after Fred G. Alberts, Geographer, United States Department of the Interior (later with the Defense Mapping Agency Topographic Center), who served as Secretary to the Advisory Committee on Antarctic Names, United States Board on Geographic Names, 1949-80, and was compiler and editor of this Gazetteer.

=== Tur Peak ===
73°06′S 167°58′E. A distinctive peak 1,470 metres (4,820 ft) high at the southeast periphery of Malta Plateau, situated along the north wall of lower Mariner Glacier 4.5 nautical miles (8.3 km; 5.2 mi) south-southeast of Mount Alberts. Mapped by USGS from surveys and United States Navy air photos, 1960-64. Named by US-ACAN for Lieutenant Juan J. Tur, United States Navy Reserve, medical officer at Hallett Station, 1957.

== Sources ==
- Alberts, Fred G., ed. (1995), Geographic Names of the Antarctic (PDF) (2 ed.), United States Board on Geographic Names This article incorporates public domain material from websites or documents of the United States Board on Geographic Names.
- Cape Hallet, USGS: United States Geographic Board, 1968
- Coulman Island, USGS: United States Geographic Board, 1967
- Riffenburgh, Beau (2007), Encyclopedia of the Antarctic, vol. 1, Taylor & Francis, ISBN 978-0-415-97024-2

This article incorporates public domain material from websites or documents of the United States Geological Survey.
