= Saxby Range =

Mountain range in Victoria Land, Antarctica

- Location within Antarctica

Highest point
- Elevation: 2,450 m (8,040 ft)
- Coordinates: 72°4′S 167°8′E

Geography
- Location: Victoria Land, Antarctica
- Parent range: Victory Mountains

The Saxby Range (72°4′S 167°8′E) is a broad mountain range, rising to 2,450 metres (8,040 ft), in the Victory Mountains of Victoria Land, Antarctica. It is bounded by Jutland Glacier, Tucker Glacier, Pearl Harbor Glacier, and Midway Glacier.

== Name ==
The Saxby Range was named by the New Zealand Antarctic Place-Names Committee (NZ-APC) in 1982 after Eric Saxby, field leader and coordinator of NZ projects during the International Northern Victoria Land Project, 1981–82.

== Location ==
The Bertalan Peak is in a block between the Jutland Glacier and McKellar Glacier to the west, Pearl Harbor Glacier to the south, Tucker Glacier to the east and north. It is drained to the south by Summers Glacier and to the west by Montecchi Glacier. Features include Boss Peak and Bridwell Peak in the north, Mount Hazlett and Latino Peak in the southeast.

== Features ==
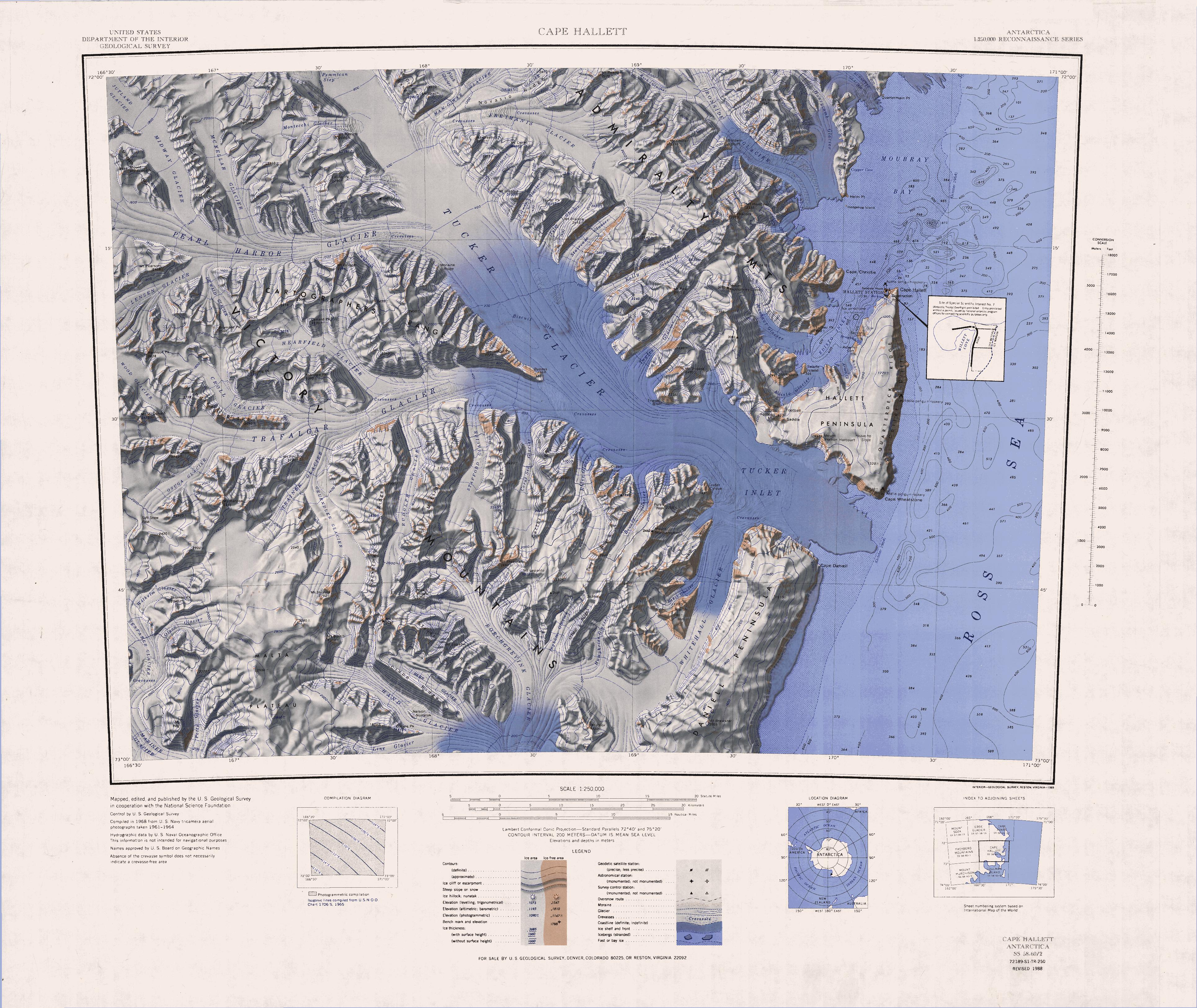
Bertalan Peak in northwest of map

=== Boss Peak ===
71°52′S 166°15′E. An isolated black peak 2,170 metres (7,120 ft) high at the east side of the terminus of Jutland Glacier, 8 nautical miles (15 km; 9.2 mi) north-northeast of Thomson Peak, in the northwest part of the Victory Mountains. Named by the northern party of the New Zealand Geological Survey Antarctic Expedition (NZGSAE), 1963-64, partly for its resemblance to the boss on a shield, its aspect and also as a reminiscence of Sir Ernest Shackleton's nickname.

=== Bridwell Peak ===
71°56′S 166°28′E. A peak 2,220 metres (7,280 ft) high 6 nautical miles (11 km; 6.9 mi) southeast of Boss Peak. Mapped by United States Geological Survey (USGS) from surveys and United States Navy aerial photographs, 1960-63. Named by United States Advisory Committee on Antarctic Names (US-ACAN) for Ray E. Bridwell, United States ArmyRP meteorologist at Hallett Station, 1964-65.

=== Evans Ridge ===
72°07′S 166°54′E. A broad ridge that trends in a north-south direction for about 12 nautical miles (22 km; 14 mi), standing between the Midway and McKellar Glaciers. Mapped by USGS from surveys and United States Navy air photos, 1960-64. Named in 1966 by US-ACAN for Arthur Evans, Secretary of the New Zealand Antarctic Place Names Committee.

=== Bertalan Peak ===
72°4′S 167°8′E. A peak 2,320 metres (7,610 ft) high, standing at the northwest side of the head of Montecchi Glacier. Mapped by the USGS from surveys and from United States Navy air photos, 1960–64. Named by the US-ACAN for Robert E. Bertalan, U.S. Navy, chief machinery repairman at McMurdo Station, 1967.

=== Mount Hazlett ===
72°06′S 167°35′E. A mountain 2,080 metres (6,820 ft) high at the south side of the mouth of Montecchi Glacier where the latter enters Tucker Glacier. Mapped by USGS from surveys and United States Navy air photos, 1960-64. Named by US-ACAN for Paul C. Hazlett, member of the United States Navy Squadron VX-6 winter party at McMurdo Station, 1968.

=== Latino Peak ===
72°09′S 167°33′E. A peak 2,290 metres (7,510 ft) high situated 4 nautical miles (7.4 km; 4.6 mi) south-southwest of Mount Hazlett. Mapped by USGS from surveys and United States Navy air photos, 1960-64. Named by US-ACAN for Terry L. Latino, United States Navy, constructionman at McMurdo Station, 1967.

== Sources ==
- Alberts, Fred G., ed. (1995), Geographic Names of the Antarctic (PDF) (2 ed.), United States Board on Geographic Names This article incorporates public domain material from websites or documents of the United States Board on Geographic Names.
- Cape Hallet, USGS: United States Geographic Board
- Ebbe Glacier, USGS: United States Geographic Board
- "Saxby Range", Geographic Names Information System, United States Geological Survey, United States Department of the Interior

This article incorporates public domain material from websites or documents of the United States Geological Survey.
