= Frame Ridge =

Frame Ridge (78°5′S 165°26′E) is a small straight ridge in the central part of Brown Peninsula, Victoria Land, Antarctica. It is located just north of the small, central lake on the peninsula and extends northward down to Tuff Bluff. It was named by the New Zealand Antarctic Place-Names Committee for Alexander Oswald Frame of Aberdeen, Scotland, a paleontology technician with the New Zealand Geological Survey and Victoria University of Wellington who discovered samples of significance (refer below) during an expedition to the area, 1964–65.

1): Alexander Oswald Frame as palaeontology technician of Victoria University (of Wellington New Zealand) expedition VUWAE 9 found glacial erratic boulders in moraines off Black Island/Brown Peninsula in the 1964/65 season in Antarctica.

Younger moraines are mostly similar in composition, but one important group contains distinctive erratics of the lava kenyite and of concretionary fossiliferous marine sediments thought to be Tertiary in age, and also contains fragments of locally derived marine sediments containing the fossil Zygochlamys.

2): A ridge was named Frame Ridge, in 1966, recognising Frame for work on sample collection and preparation, though the ridge itself was notably important from a volcanology perspective.

3): Subsequent scientific work on samples from VUWAE 9 identified fossils, and described connecting them to South American samples.

Expedition VUWAE 9 summary report is available online here: http://nzetc.victoria.ac.nz//tm/scholarly/tei-VUW1964-65Anta.html

https://gazetteer.linz.govt.nz/place/11037

Article that the new names were intended for: https://www.tandfonline.com/doi/pdf/10.1080/00288306.1968.10420754

This article, 1966, appears to follow up on the VUWAE 9 samples from a Palynology perspective (fossil pollen), noting the South American connection:

https://www.tandfonline.com/doi/pdf/10.1080/0028825X.1966.10429050 with acknowledgement for Alexander Oswald Frame at the bottom

This article a few years later, studying fossils in the samples from VUWAE 9 also makes the Antarctic-South America connection:

https://www.tandfonline.com/doi/pdf/10.1080/03036758.1972.10421821 - there is a further acknowledgement for Frame at the bottom
