= Daniell Peninsula =

Peninsula in Ross Dependency, Antarctica

Daniell Peninsula (72°50′S 169°35′E) is the large peninsula between Cape Daniell and Cape Jones on the coast of Victoria Land, Antarctica. It is an elongated basalt dome similar to Adare Peninsula and Hallett Peninsula and rises to 2,000 metres (6,600 ft). It is partly separated from the Victory Mountains by Whitehall Glacier, which is afloat in its lower reaches, but is joined to these mountains by the higher land in the vicinity of Mount Prior. It was named by the New Zealand Geological Survey Antarctic Expedition (NZGSAE), 1957–58, after Cape Daniell, and by analogy with the Adare and Hallett peninsulas.

== Geology ==
The Daniell Peninsula consists of at least four overlapping shield volcanoes that form part of the Hallett Volcanic Province of the McMurdo Volcanic Group. Mount Brewster forms the central portion of the Daniell Peninsula and rises to an elevation of 2,026 m (6,647 ft), forming the highest point on the peninsula. K–Ar or Rb–Sr dating has given an age of 12.4 ± 0.2 million years for Mount Brewster pantelleritic trachyte and an age of 6.9 ± 0.3 million years for Mount Brewster hawaiite lava.

A second shield volcano forming the southern end of the peninsula is deeply dissected by the Mandible Cirque. It contains the small satellite vent of Tousled Peak and the prominent ice-draped cone-like peak of Mount Lubbock. A dike cutting Mandible Cirque comenditic trachyte has given an age of 9.5 ± 0.1 million years.

The Cape Daniell shield volcano at the northern end of the Daniell Peninsula has an elevation of 1,910 m (6,270 ft), with its highest point being an unnamed peak. The summit area contains a flat region several kilometres wide that might be a small ice-filled caldera. Cape Daniell trachyte lava has an age of 5.8 ± 0.1 million years while Cape Daniell benmoreite lava has an age of 5.6 ± 0.5 million years.

== Geography ==
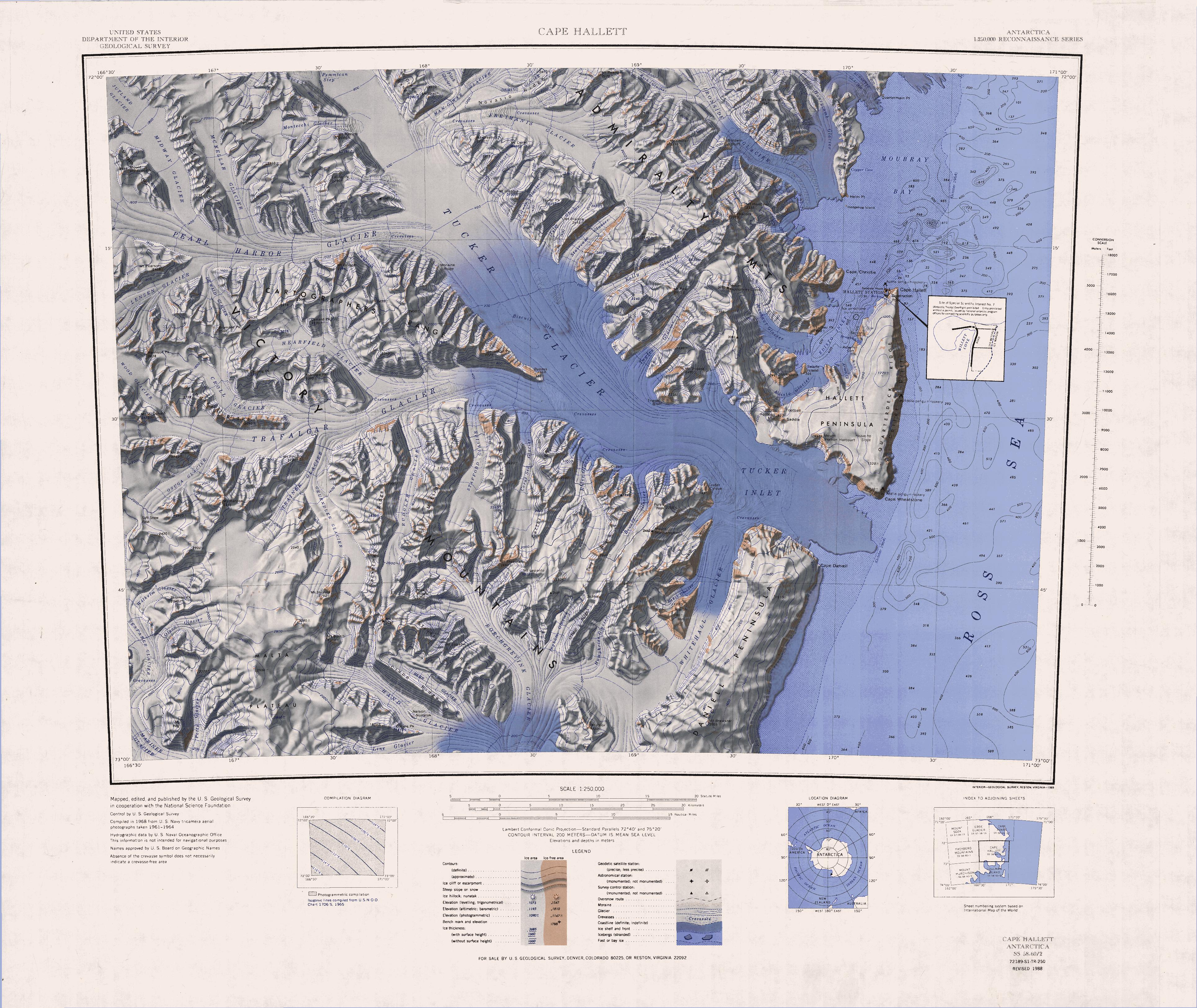
North of peninsula in south of map

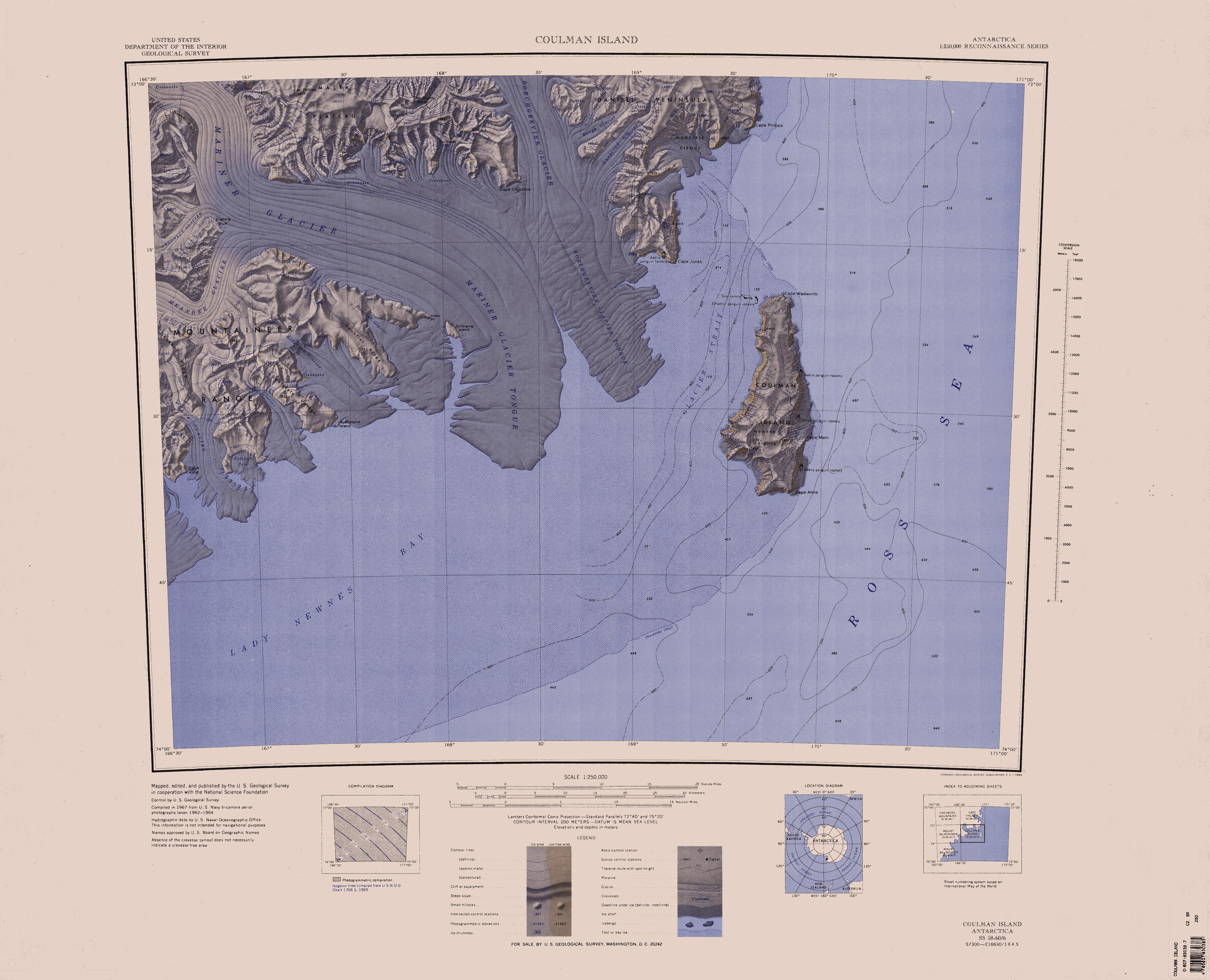
South of peninsula in north of map

The Daniell Peninsula extends along the west coast of the Ross Sea to the east of the Victory Mountains. The Borchgrevink Glacier flows down the southwestern coast of the peninsula, from which it is fed by the Langevad Glacier and the Bargh Glacier. Mount Prior looks over the point where the Humphries Glacier flowing southwest joins the Borchgrevink Glacier. The Humphries Glacier is saddled with the Whitehall Glacier, which flows north from below Mount Brewster along the east coast of the peninsula to enter Tucker Inlet at the north of the peninsula. Cape Jones is the southernmost point of the Peninsula. North of Cape Jones are Mount Lubbock, Touried Peak, Narrow Neck, the Mandible Cirque and Cape Phillips. Cape Daniell on the northeast of the peninsula marks the mouth of the Tucker Inlet, opposite Cape Wheatstone on the Hallett Peninsula to the north.

== Features ==
Named features of the Daniell Peninsula include:

=== Mount Prior ===
72°58′S 168°47′E. A mountain, 1,220 metres (4,000 ft) high, about 10 nautical miles (19 km; 12 mi) west of Mount Brewster, rising at the head of Whitehall Glacier in the west part of Daniell Peninsula. Named by New Zealand Geological Survey Antarctic Expedition (NZGSAE), 1957–58, for George T. Prior of the Mineral Department, British Museum, who studied and analyzed the rocks obtained from this region by the British National Antarctic Expedition (BrNAE), 1901-04.

=== Mount Brewster ===
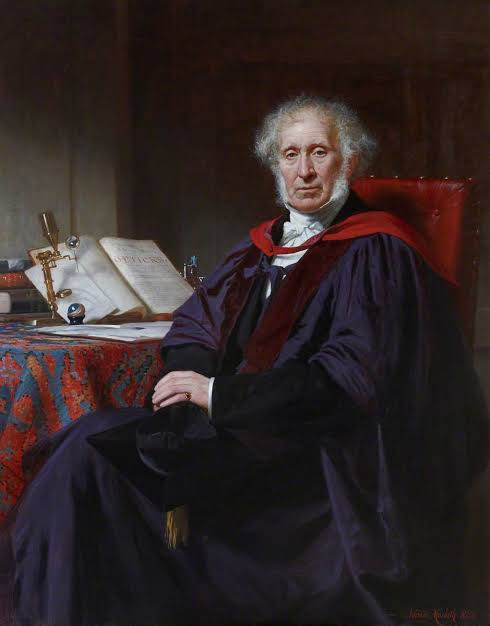
David Brewster

72°57′S 169°23′E. A small peak, 2,025 metres (6,644 ft) high, that rises above the general level of the central part of Daniell Peninsula and marks its greatest elevation. Named in 1841 by Sir James Clark Ross for Sir David Brewster, Scottish physicist.

=== Cape Jones ===
73°17′S 169°13′E. The cape lying immediately southeast of Mount Lubbock and marking the south tip of Daniell Peninsula. Discovered in January 1841 by Sir James Clark Ross who named it for Captain William Jones, Royal Navy.

=== Mount Lubbock ===
73°13′S 169°08′E. A coastal peak, 1,630 metres (5,350 ft) high, rising immediately north of Cape Jones at the south end of Daniell Peninsula. Discovered in January 1841 by Sir James Clark Ross who named it for Sir John Lubbock, treasurer of the Royal Society.

=== Touried Peak ===
73°11′S 169°01′E. Small ice-covered peak, 1,220 metres (4,000 ft) high, situated 3.5 nautical miles (6.5 km; 4.0 mi) northwest of the summit of Mount Lubbock in the south end of Daniell Peninsula, Victoria Land. The name given by New Zealand Antarctic Place Names Committee (NZ-APC) in 1966 is descriptive of the exceptionally broken ice summit.

=== Narrow Neck ===
73°06′S 169°03′E. A narrow, but elevated isthmus or neck of land between Langevad Glacier and Mandible Cirque in the south part of Daniell Peninsula. The feature serves to join Tousled Peak and the Mount Lubbock vicinity to the main mass of Daniell Peninsula. The descriptive name was applied by NZ-APC in 1966.

=== Mandible Cirque ===
73°07′S 169°15′E. A spectacular cirque indenting the coast of Daniell Peninsula 5 nautical miles (9.3 km; 5.8 mi) west-southwest of Cape Phillips. Named in 1966 by the NZ-APC for its appearance in plan and oblique views.

=== Cape Phillips ===
73°04′S 169°36′E. A cape approximately midway along the east side of Daniell Peninsula, 8 nautical miles (15 km; 9.2 mi) southeast of Mount Brewster. Discovered in January 1841 by Sir James Clark Ross who named it for Lieutenant Charles G. Phillips of the Terror.

=== Cape Daniell ===
72°43′S 169°55′E. A cape at the northeast extremity of Daniell Peninsula which marks the south side of the entrance to Tucker Inlet. Discovered, January 15, 1841, by Sir James Clark Ross who named it for Professor John Frederic Daniell, chemist of King's College, Cambridge University, and Foreign Secretary of the Royal Society.

== Sources ==
- Alberts, Fred G., ed. (1995), Geographic Names of the Antarctic (PDF) (2 ed.), United States Board on Geographic Names This article incorporates public domain material from websites or documents of the United States Board on Geographic Names.
- Cape Hallet, USGS: United States Geological Survey
- Coulman Island, USGS: United States Geological Survey

This article incorporates public domain material from websites or documents of the United States Geological Survey.
