= New Zealand Antarctic Place-Names Committee =

Advisory committee for Antarctic geographic naming

The New Zealand Antarctic Place-Names Committee (NZ-APC), formally known as the Antarctic Names Committee (ANC), is an expert advisory body that evaluates and recommends official geographic names for features in Antarctica, particularly within New Zealand's area of interest including the Ross Dependency. Operating as a subcommittee of the New Zealand Geographic Board Ngā Pou Taunaha o Aotearoa (NZGB), it was established in 1956 to standardise naming practices amid growing Antarctic exploration and to ensure that names honour historical events, scientific contributions, and cultural values.

The committee's activities date to at least 1958, when formal minutes of its meetings began, coinciding with New Zealand's expanded role in Antarctic affairs during the International Geophysical Year and subsequent expeditions. The committee works in close collaboration with similar place-naming authorities in Australia, the United Kingdom, and the United States to achieve concurrence on naming decisions, and it contributes all approved names to the SCAR Composite Gazetteer of Antarctica, a comprehensive international database supporting research and logistics on the continent.

== Establishment and history ==
A Cabinet Directive in December 1956 appointed the New Zealand Geographic Board as the authority for place naming in the Ross Dependency, New Zealand's claimed sector of Antarctica between 160° east and 150° west longitude. This decision came amid increasing international expeditions following the International Geophysical Year (1957–1958) and the negotiation of the Antarctic Treaty, which New Zealand ratified in 1960.

The Antarctic Place-Names Committee was formed as an advisory body under the Board, with formal minutes of meetings beginning in 1958. Its mandate focused on assigning official names to natural features—such as mountains, glaciers, valleys, and bays—within New Zealand's Antarctic sector, while excluding permanent research bases to align with international conventions. Representatives from key government departments involved in Antarctic affairs, including the Department of Scientific and Industrial Research and the Lands and Survey Department, contributed to its early work.

The New Zealand Geographic Board (Ngā Pou Taunaha o Aotearoa) Act 2008 formally codified the committee's role within the Board's statutory framework, granting it authority over naming in the Ross Dependency and expanding its jurisdiction to undersea features. The Act also enhanced the incorporation of Māori names through mandated consultation with iwi (tribes) to honour cultural values.

== Role and responsibilities ==
The NZ-APC operates under the authority of the NZGB as established by the New Zealand Geographic Board (Ngā Pou Taunaha o Aotearoa) Act 2008. Section 8 of the Act grants the Board jurisdiction over geographic features within the Ross Dependency, defined as the area south of 60°S latitude between 160°E and 150°W longitude.

The committee's scope is confined to natural geographic features, adhering to the principle of univocity (one name per feature). It explicitly excludes naming living organisms, artificial structures (including research stations), or temporary operational designations.

=== Composition and membership ===
The Antarctic Names Committee comprises at least two NZGB Board members alongside several expert members selected for their specialised knowledge, including geographers, historians, Antarctic scientists and operational specialists, and representatives from Māori communities to incorporate cultural perspectives. Members are appointed by the NZGB for renewable three‑year terms.

The committee meets at least annually, typically through in‑person or teleconference formats, with ad‑hoc sessions arranged for urgent international proposals.

=== Procedures for proposing names ===
Proposals for new Antarctic names may be submitted by scientists, explorers, field parties, or the general public via an online form available through Land Information New Zealand (LINZ). Submissions must include the feature's geographic coordinates, type, discovery or mapping history, and a clear rationale for the proposed name, supported by maps or historical records.

Upon receipt, the NZGB Secretariat conducts an initial assessment, including archival research and verification of the feature's unnamed status via the New Zealand Gazetteer and the SCAR Composite Gazetteer of Antarctica. The proposal then advances to the Antarctic Place‑Names Committee for internal review, where it is evaluated against the Board's naming criteria. The committee may consult with international bodies such as the United States Advisory Committee on Antarctic Names (US‑ACAN) for proposals in the shared Ross Sea region, as well as the Australian Antarctic Division Place Names Committee for overlapping areas.

If the proposal meets the required standards, the committee recommends approval to the full NZGB, which makes the final decision by majority vote. Once approved, the name is published in the New Zealand Gazette and integrated into the NZGB Gazetteer of Official Geographic Names, as well as the SCAR Composite Gazetteer of Antarctica.

== Naming criteria and guidelines ==
The committee applies specific criteria outlined in the NZGB Standard for Antarctic Place Names (NZGBS60003, revised August 2023). Names must conform to standard New Zealand English or te reo Māori orthography, with Māori names requiring accurate use of macrons and other conventions based on advice from licensed translators or relevant iwi/hapū.

=== Acceptable names ===
- Commemorative names honour individuals or events with significant Antarctic connections, such as past explorers, scientists, or those who made exceptional contributions to research or service.
- Descriptive names characterise the feature's shape, colour, composition, or distinguishing attributes.
- Cultural names reflect Māori perspectives and identity, advancing Treaty of Waitangi principles in naming practices.
- Thematic names group related features (e.g., constellations, mythology, or expedition members).

=== Restrictions ===
Names that are derogatory, discriminatory, frivolous, offensive, or commercially influenced are prohibited. Duplicate names, first names alone, numbers, or abbreviations (except "St." for Saint) are also disallowed. Only one official name is assigned per feature, and naming is generally avoided for minor or low‑significance features.

== International collaboration ==
The NZ-APC works closely with the United States Advisory Committee on Antarctic Names (US‑ACAN), the UK Antarctic Place-Names Committee, and the Australian Antarctic Division Place Names Committee to achieve concurrence on naming decisions and prevent duplicate names across jurisdictions.

The committee participates in the Standing Committee on Antarctic Geographic Information (SCAGI) under the Scientific Committee on Antarctic Research (SCAR). The NZGB Secretary and the Chair of the Antarctic Names Committee are members of SCAGI, which is responsible for collating place names in Antarctica and producing the SCAR Composite Gazetteer of Antarctica (CGA). The CGA compiles over 38,000 names from 22 nations to support research and logistics on the continent.

New Zealand also represents its interests as a Member State of the United Nations Group of Experts on Geographical Names (UNGEGN).

== Names attributed by the committee ==
The NZ-APC has contributed more than 4,300 official Antarctic names to the New Zealand Gazetteer, many of which are integrated into the global Composite Gazetteer of Antarctica. Notable examples include:

- Hillary Coast – named in 1963 to honour Sir Edmund Hillary for leading the New Zealand party of the Commonwealth Trans‑Antarctic Expedition.
- Von Tunzelmann Point – named in 1984 for the site of New Zealand's first recorded landing on the Antarctic continent in 1895 by Alexander von Tunzelmann.
- Arena Saddle – named in conjunction with Arena Valley.
- Foggy Pass – named for descriptive area weather features.
- Frame Ridge – named after Alexander Oswald Frame, paleontology technician.
- Mount Burrows – named after A.L. Burrows.
- Mount Jennings – named after Peter Jennings, field assistant and mechanic.

== See also ==
- New Zealand Geographic Board
- Ross Dependency
- SCAR Composite Gazetteer of Antarctica
- United States Advisory Committee on Antarctic Names
- UK Antarctic Place-Names Committee
