= Mount Melbourne =

Stratovolcano in the Antarctic

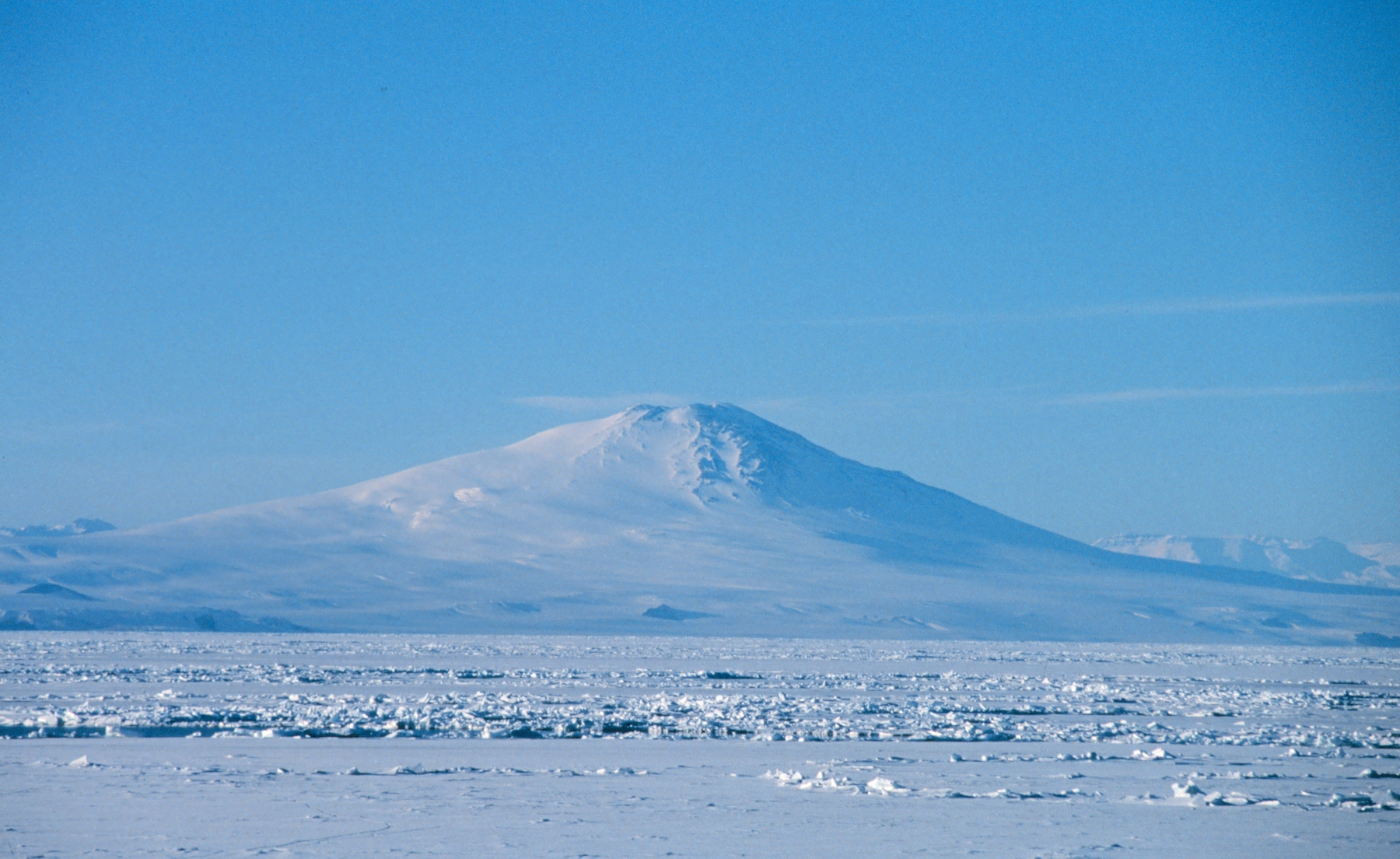
- Mount Melbourne seen from the ice-covered Ross Sea

Highest point
- Elevation: 2,733 m (8,967 ft)
- Coordinates: 74°21′S 164°42′E

Geography
- Location within Antarctica
- Location: Victoria Land, Antarctica

Geology
- Rock age: Unknown
- Mountain type: Stratovolcano
- Volcanic belt: McMurdo Volcanic Group
- Last eruption: 1892 ± thirty years

Mount Melbourne is a 2,733-metre-high (8,967 ft) ice-covered stratovolcano in Victoria Land, Antarctica, between Wood Bay and Terra Nova Bay. It is an elongated mountain with a summit caldera filled with ice with numerous parasitic vents; a volcanic field surrounds the edifice. Mount Melbourne has a volume of about 180 cubic kilometres (43 cu mi) and consists of tephra deposits and lava flows; tephra deposits are also found encased within ice and have been used to date the last eruption of Mount Melbourne to 1892 ± 30 years. The volcano is fumarolically active.

The volcano is part of the McMurdo Volcanic Group, and together with The Pleiades, Mount Overlord, Mount Rittmann and the Malta Plateau forms a subprovince, the Melbourne volcanic province. The volcanism is related both to the West Antarctic Rift and to local tectonic structures such as faults and grabens. (Note: A graben is an elongated area where the crust is depressed along faults, which form its long sides.) Mount Melbourne has mainly erupted trachyandesite and trachyte, which formed within a magma chamber; basaltic rocks are less common.

Geothermal heat flow on Mount Melbourne has created a unique ecosystem formed by mosses and liverworts that grow between fumaroles, ice towers, and ice hummocks. This type of vegetation is found at other volcanoes of Antarctica and develops when volcanic heat generates meltwater from snow and ice, thus allowing plants to grow in the cold Antarctic environment. These mosses are particularly common in a protected area known as Cryptogam Ridge within and south of the summit caldera.

== Description ==
Mount Melbourne lies in North Victoria Land, facing Wood Bay of the Ross Sea. To the southeast lies Cape Washington and due south lies Terra Nova Bay; Campbell Glacier runs west from the volcano and Tinker Glacier lies north of the volcanic field. The seasonal Italian Mario Zucchelli Station lies 40 kilometres (25 mi) from the volcano and the Korean Jang Bogo Station 30 kilometres (19 mi); the 5th Chinese station in Antarctica (due to be completed in 2022), the German Gondwana Station and a neutrino detector are also in the area. Mount Melbourne was discovered and first recognized as a volcano by James Ross in 1841 and named after William Lamb, 2nd Viscount Melbourne, who was then the prime minister of the United Kingdom. The volcano and its surroundings were investigated by New Zealand-based parties in the 1960s, by German ones in the 1970s and 1980s and by Italian-based parties in the 1980s and 1990s. The volcano and its summit can be accessed from the stations by helicopter.

=== Volcano ===
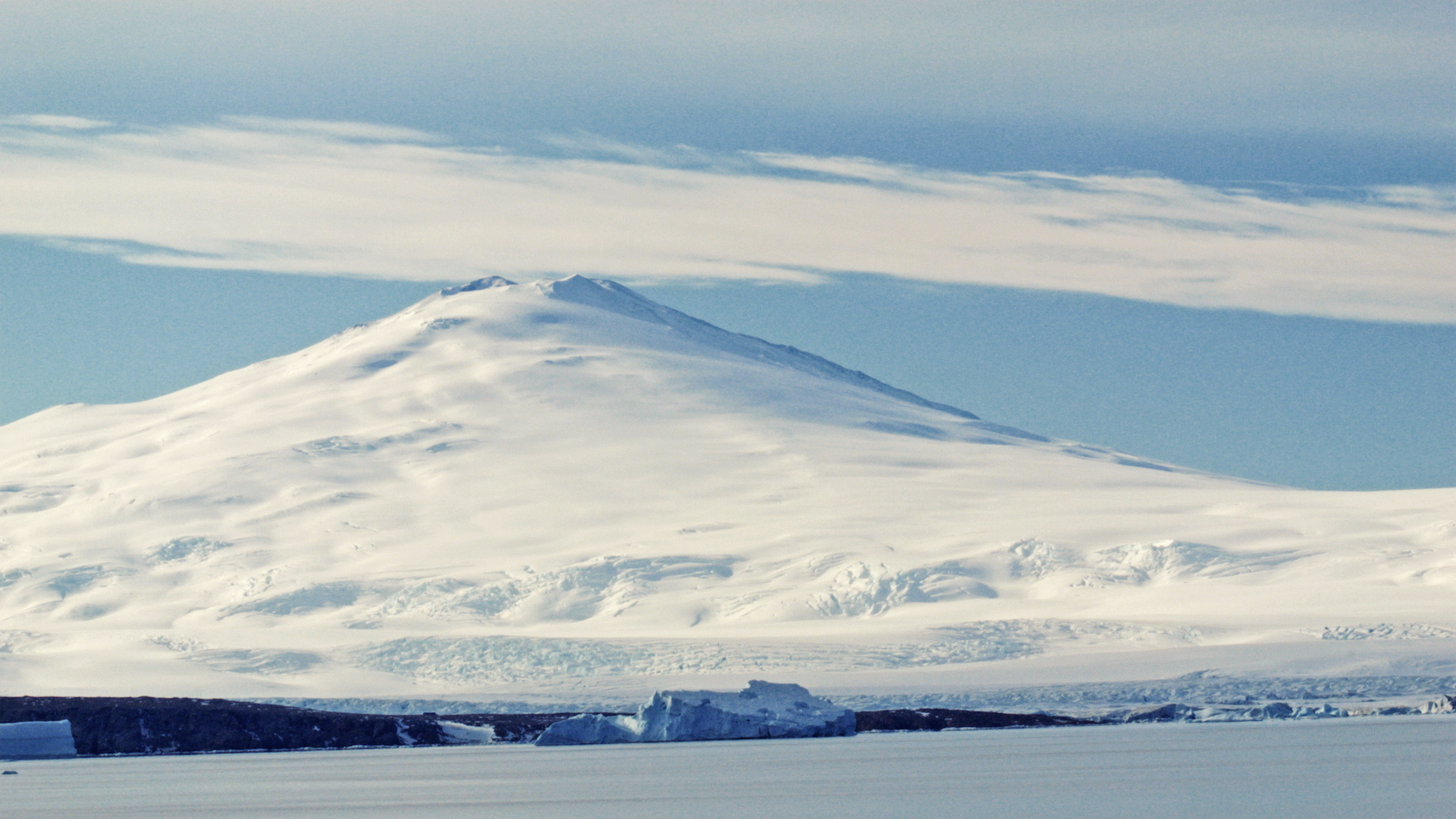
Mount Melbourne as seen from Zucchelli Station

Mount Melbourne is an elongated stratovolcano (Note: Different authors use different terms to describe Mount Melbourne and similar volcanoes in Antarctica, including "stratovolcano", "shield volcano" and "composite volcano".) formed by lava flows and tephra fall deposits (Note: Fall deposits are volcanic deposits formed by material precipitating out from an eruption column.), with gentle slopes. The volcano is uneroded and forms a cone with a base area of 25 by 55 kilometres (16 mi × 34 mi). Viewed from afar, Mount Melbourne has a nearly perfect cone-like profile that has drawn comparisons to Mount Etna in Italy and Mount Ruapehu in New Zealand. Lava domes and short lava flows form the summit while volcanic mounds, cones, domes and scoria cones dot its flanks; 6.4 kilometres (4 mi) from the summit is a large parasitic vent on the north-northeastern slope, which generated several lava flows. Part of the edifice rises from below sea level. Pyroclastic flow deposits – a rarity for Antarctic volcanoes – have been reported. The total volume of the edifice is about 180 cubic kilometres (43 cu mi).

A 1-kilometre-wide (0.62 mi) crater or caldera sits at the top of the volcano. The highest point of the volcano lies east-northeast of the caldera and reaches 2,733 metres (8,967 ft) elevation. (Note: An elevation of 2,730 metres (8,960 ft) has been reported.) The caldera has an incomplete rim and is filled with snow, leaving a 500-metre-wide (1,600 ft) depression. The rim of the caldera is covered by volcanic ejecta including lapilli and lava bombs, probably the products of the most recent eruption, which overlie a 15-metre-thick (49 ft) layer of pumice lapilli. Three small, nested craters formed by phreatomagmatic eruptions occur on the southern rim of the summit caldera. Pyroclastic fall deposits crop out in the northern rim of the caldera and there are more alternating lava-tephra sequences elsewhere in the summit region. There is evidence of past structural instability (collapse structures) on the eastern and southeastern flanks, and an arcuate (with the shape of an arc) 50-to-100-metre-high (160 to 330 ft) scarp on the eastern flank appears to be an incipient sector collapse.

Except for geothermal areas, the ground is bouldery. Some of the coastal areas around the volcano are ice-free and rocky. Frost heave has been observed in the summit region. Small creeks flow down the eastern flank of Mount Melbourne; they are fed by meltwater during summer and quickly disappear when the snow is gone.

=== Glaciation ===
The mountain is covered with permanent ice, which extends to the coast and leaves only a few exposures of the underlying rock; rocky outcrops are most exposed on the eastern flank. The caldera hosts a névé that generates a westward-flowing glacier. An icefall lies northwest of the caldera. Glaciers emanating from snowfields on the volcano have deposited moraines; these and tills from both Pleistocene (Note: The period of time between 2.5800 and 0.0117 million years ago.) and Holocene (Note: The time period between 11,700 years ago and today.) glaciations crop out at Edmonson Point.

Tephra layers crop out in ice cliffs and seracs and testify to recent eruptions, including the one that deposited the ejecta and lapilli pumice units on the summit. Tephra bands are also found in other glaciers of the region. They form when snow accumulates on top of tephra that fell onto ice and in the case of Mount Melbourne they indicate eruptions during the last few thousand years. Volcanic sediments from Mount Melbourne are also found in Terra Nova Bay. The Campbell Glacier carries glacial erratics derived from Mount Melbourne.

=== Volcanic field ===
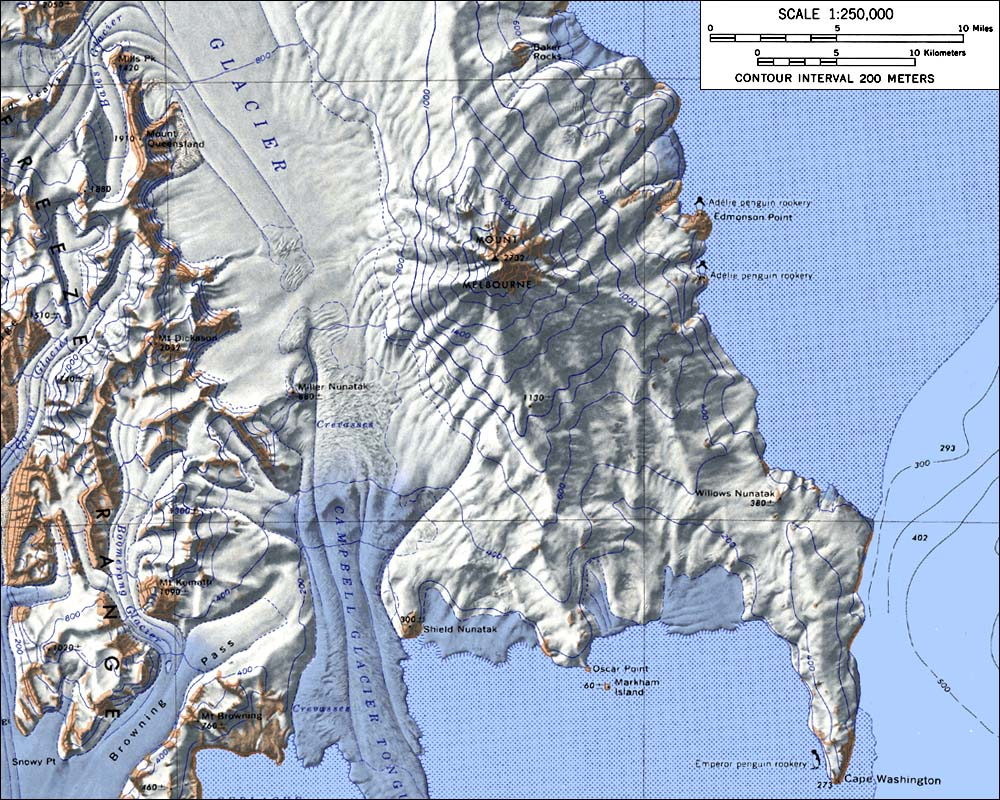
Topographic map of Mount Melbourne (1:250,000 scale) from USGS Mount Melbourne

Mount Melbourne is surrounded by a volcanic field consisting of 60 exposed volcanoes, which have the form of scoria cones and tuff rings with hyaloclastite deposits, lava flows and pillow lavas. Some of these volcanoes formed under ice. The volcanic field forms a peninsula which is separated by steep faults from the Transantarctic Mountains to the north. Among these volcanoes is Shield Nunatak southwest from Mount Melbourne, a subglacial volcano, now exposed, that may have formed during the last 21,000 to 17,000 years. The Cape Washington ridge consists mostly of lava, including pillow lava, overlaid by scoria cones, and is the remnant of a shield volcano. Edmonson Point is another volcanic complex in the volcanic field that formed partly while interacting with glaciers and partly through phreatomagmatic activity. Other volcanoes in the field are Baker Rocks, Oscar Point and Random Hills. These volcanoes are aligned mainly in a north–south direction, with palagonitized (Note: Palagonitization is a chemical process during which volcanic glass undergoes alteration to become palagonite.) outcrops that expose dikes. Perfectly preserved scoria cones occur at Pinckard Table north of the volcanic field, while Harrow Peak is a heavily eroded lava plug. The total volume of volcanic rocks is about 250 cubic kilometres (60 cu mi) and their emplacement apparently altered the path of the Campbell Glacier.

== Geology ==
West Antarctic Rift system in the Ross Sea; red dashed line is the margin of the rift.

Mount Melbourne is part of the McMurdo Volcanic Group, which includes the active volcano Mount Erebus. This volcanic group is one of the largest alkaline volcanic (Note: "Alkaline" is a classification for a wide variety of volcanic rocks, with a common definition being rocks that contain more alkali elements than can be taken up by the mineral feldspar.) provinces in the world, comparable with that of the East African Rift, and is subdivided into the Melbourne, the Hallett and the Erebus volcanic provinces. The volcanic group consists of large shield volcanoes mainly near the coast, stratovolcanoes and monogenetic volcanoes which formed parallel to the Transantarctic Mountains.

Volcanic activity of the McMurdo Volcanic Group is tied to continental rifting and commenced during the Oligocene. (Note: The period of time between 33.9 and 23.03 million years ago.) It is unclear whether this is caused by a local hotspot beneath the area or mantle convection in the area of the West Antarctic Rift. The latter is one of the largest continental rifts (Note: A continental rift is a basin with an elongated shape, where the crust has drifted apart and has thus become thinned.) on Earth but little known and possibly inactive today. The Ross Sea and the Victoria Land Basin developed along this rift and were deeply buried, while the Transantarctic Mountains were rapidly uplifted during the last fifty million years and are on the "shoulder" of the rift. The line separating the two is a major crustal suture, with large differences in elevation and crustal thickness across the suture. Many of the volcanoes appear to have formed under the influence of fault zones in the area, and increased activity in the last thirty million years has been correlated to the reactivation of faults.

Mount Melbourne is part of a volcano alignment that includes The Pleiades, Mount Overlord, Mount Rittmann – all large stratovolcanoes – which with the Malta Plateau form the Melbourne province of the McMurdo Volcanic Group. In addition, this province consists of numerous smaller volcanic centres, volcanic intrusions and sequences of volcanic rocks, and it has been active for the past twenty-five million years. Volcanic edifices buried under sediment are also part of the Melbourne province, including a cone southeast of Cape Washington, which has a size comparable to that of Mount Melbourne.

Mount Melbourne and its volcanic field are over a basement of Precambrian (Note: The period of time before 541 ± 1 million years ago.) to Ordovician (Note: The period of time between 485.4 ± 1.9 and 443.8 ± 1.5 million years ago.) age, which consists of volcanic and metamorphic rocks of the Wilson Terrane. The volcano is at the intersection of three geological structures: the Rennick Graben of Cretaceous (Note: The period of time between 145 and 66 million years ago.) age, the Victoria Land Basin and the Polar 3 magnetic anomaly (Note: The anomaly has been interpreted to be either a transform fault or a push-up structure formed by faulting.). The Terror Rift in the Victoria Land Basin runs between Mount Melbourne and Mount Erebus and appears to be related to their existence. Mount Melbourne appears to lie in a graben; the marginal faults on the eastern flank of Mount Melbourne are still active with earthquakes. North–south-trending faulting may also be responsible for the trend in edifice structure, and strike-slip faulting takes place on the eastern flank. Recent offset on faults and Holocene coastal uplift in the area indicates that tectonic activity is ongoing.

Tomographic studies have shown an area of low seismic velocity at 80 kilometres (50 mi) depth under the volcano, which may be due to temperatures there being 300 °C (540 °F) hotter than normal. Anomalies underneath Mount Melbourne are connected to similar anomalies under the Terror Rift. These anomalies above 100 kilometres (62 mi) depth are focused under Mount Melbourne and the neighbouring Priestley Fault. A low gravity anomaly over Mount Melbourne may reflect either the presence of low-density volcanic rocks or of a magma chamber under the volcano.

=== Composition ===
Trachyandesite and trachyte are the most common rocks on Mount Melbourne, with basalt being less common and mostly occurring around its base. The rocks define a mildly alkaline suite rich in potassium, unlike the rocks elsewhere in the volcanic field. The rest of the volcanic field also features alkali basalts, basanite and mugearite. Phenocrysts include aegirine, amphibole, anorthoclase, augite, clinopyroxene, fayalite, hedenbergite, ilmenite, kaersutite, magnetite, olivine, plagioclase and sanidine. Gneiss, granulite, harzburgite, lherzolite and tholeiite xenoliths are found in the volcanic field and form the core of many lava bombs. Inclusions in xenoliths indicate that the gaseous components of the Mount Melbourne volcanic field magmas consist mainly of carbon dioxide. The rocks in the volcanic field have porphyritic to vitrophyric textures.

The trachytes and mugearites formed through magmatic differentiation in a crustal magma chamber from alkali basalts, defining an alkali basalt-trachyte differentiation series. Basalts were mainly erupted early in the history of the volcano. During the last hundred thousand years the magma chamber became established; this allowed both the differentiation of trachytes and the occurrence of large eruptions. A gap in the rock spectrum ("Daly gap") with a scarcity of benmoreite and mugearite has been noted at Mount Melbourne and other volcanoes in the region. There is no agreement on which processes contributed to petrogenesis in the Mount Melbourne volcanic field but diverse mantle domains and assimilation and fractional crystallization processes appear to have played a role. The magmatic system that feeds Mount Melbourne appears to have a composition distinct from the one associated with the Mount Melbourne volcanic field.

Hydrothermal alteration has affected parts of the summit area, leaving yellow and white deposits that contrast with the black volcanic rocks. Hydrothermal sinter deposits have formed in geothermal areas from past liquid water flow. Clay containing allophane, amorphous silica and feldspar are found in the summit area.

== Eruption history ==
Mount Melbourne was active beginning 3.0–2.7 million years ago. Activity has been subdivided into an older Pliocene Cape Washington stage, an early Pleistocene Random Hills stage, the Shield Nunatak stage that is 400,000 to 100,000 years old, and the recent Mount Melbourne stage. Volcanic activity migrated north from Cape Washington towards the Transantarctic Mountains and eventually became centralized at Mount Melbourne. During the last hundred thousand years Mount Melbourne has produced about 0.0015 cubic kilometres per year (0.00036 mi^{3}/a) of magma. The earliest records of the volcano noted its young appearance.

=== Mount Melbourne volcanic field ===
Ages obtained on the Mount Melbourne volcanic field include 2.96 ± 0.20 million years, 740,000 ± 100,000 years and 200,000 ± 40,000 years for Baker Rocks, 2.7 ± 0.2 million years and 450,000 ± 50,000 years for Cape Washington, 74,000 ± 110,000 years and 50,000 ± 20,000 years for Edmonson Point, less than 400,000 years for Markham Island, 745,000 ± 66,000 years for Harrows Peak, 1.368 ± 0.090 million years for Pinkard Table, 1.55 ± 0.05 million years, 431,000 ± 82,000 and 110,000 ± 70,000 years for Shield Nunatak, and 2.5 ± 0.1 million years for Willows Nunatak. The northeastern parasitic cone formed after the bulk of the volcano and appears to be younger than the summit.

Radiometric dating has shown that the appearance of a landform at Mount Melbourne is not indicative of its age; some well preserved vents are older than heavily eroded ones. On the other hand, a lack of proper margins of error and lack of details on which samples were dated has been problematic for radiometric dating efforts.

=== Tephra ===
Tephra found at the Allan Hills, in Dome C and in the Siple Dome ice cores may come from Mount Melbourne. Some marine tephra layers originally attributed to Mount Melbourne may instead come from Mount Rittmann, and many tephra layers in the area have compositions that do not match these from Mount Melbourne. There are additional tephra layers attributed to the volcano:

- Tephra layers less than 500,000 years old in the Frontier Mountain and Lichen Hills blue-ice areas have been attributed to volcanoes in the Mount Melbourne volcanic province.
- A tephra layer less than 30,000 years old in a sediment core from the Ross Sea has a composition indicating that it was erupted at Mount Melbourne. Its deposition has been used to infer that that part of the western Ross Sea was ice-free at that time.
- A tephra layer found in the Ross Sea has been interpreted as originating from an eruption of Mount Melbourne 9,700 ± 5,300 years ago.
- In the Talos Dome ice core record, two tephra layers emplaced 2,680 and 5,280 years ago have compositions similar to these of Mount Melbourne.
- Tephra layers at Siple Dome indicate eruptions at Mount Melbourne in 304 CE, which deposited substantial amounts of sulfate on the ice sheet.
- A tephra layer at Siple Dome dated to 1810 CE might have been erupted by Mount Melbourne, but its attribution is less certain than for the 304 CE tephra.

=== Mount Melbourne proper ===
The Edmonson Point ignimbrite is a trachytic ignimbrite that crops out at Edmonson Point. It consists of three units of ash-supported, lapilli- and pumice-rich deposits with intercalated breccia lenses that reach a thickness of 30 metres (98 ft). They are two ignimbrite units separated by a base surge deposit. Faulting has offset the sequences, which are intruded by dikes. The Edmonson Point ignimbrite was produced by large Plinian eruptions and is about 115,000 years old. The eruption deposited tephra into the Ross Sea, and correlative tephra layers were found in the Talos Dome ice core.

After this ignimbrite, a series of dikes gave rise to the Adelie Penguin Rookery lava field. This lava field, which probably formed subglacially, is made up by numerous blocky lava flows with glassy margins that reach a thickness of 300 metres (1,000 ft) and are formed by hawaiite and benmoreite. They were fed through numerous dikes, which also gave rise to small scoria cones and spatter cones, and were emplaced non-contemporaneously. A tuff cone rises from the lava field and is formed by monogenetic volcano ejecta, including lava bombs encasing granite fragments and bombs large enough to leave craters in the ash they fell in. Ropy basalt lava flows with an uncertain source vent, and a undissected scoria cone rise above the lava field and complete the Edmonson Point system. The Adelie Penguin Rookery lava field was erupted about 90,000 years ago, and its emplacement may have been accompanied by the emission of tephra recorded in the Talos Dome ice core. The eruptions of the last 120,000 years probably caused the anomalous thinning of the Campbell Glacier during that time, which is unlike the behaviour of other Antarctic glaciers.

Rocks at the summit have ages of between 260,000 and 10,000 years. Individual eruptions have been dated to 10,000 ± 20,000, 80,000 ± 15,000, 260,000 ± 60,000 and 15,000 ± 35,000 years ago. Highly imprecise ages of late Pleistocene to Holocene age have been obtained from the ejecta layer on the summit. One large eruption took place 13,500 ± 4,300 years ago. Three cryptotephra layers in Edisto Inlet (close to Cape Hallett) have been attributed to eruptions that took place between 1,677 and 1,615 years before present; a tephra layer from Roosevelt Island dates to the same time. These eruptions probably took place on parasitic vents of Mount Melbourne. Two more parasitic eruptions took place in the same timeframe.

=== Last eruption and present-day activity ===
Tephrochronology has yielded an age of 1892 ± 30 CE for the last eruption. This eruption deposited a major tephra layer around the volcano, which crops out mainly on its eastern side and in the Aviator and Tinker Glaciers. The three small craters on the rim of the Mount Melbourne summit crater formed at the end of this eruption.

No eruptions have been observed during historical time, and Mount Melbourne is considered to be quiescent (Note: Sometimes it is referred to as an active volcano, since it had eruptions during the Holocene.) and a low-hazard volcano. Ongoing deformation and seismic activity occurs at Mount Melbourne, and the latter may be caused either by the movement of fluids underground or by fracturing processes. Icequakes caused by glacier movement also occur. Geothermal activity was steady between 1963 and 1983, while ground deformation commenced in 1997. This deformation was probably caused by changes in the geothermal system.

=== Hazards and monitoring ===
Future moderate to large explosive eruptions such as Plinian eruptions are possible. The prevailing winds would transport volcanic ash eastward across the Ross Sea, and the ash might affect research stations close to Mount Melbourne such as Mario Zucchelli, Gondwana and Jang Bogo. The hazards of Antarctic volcano eruptions are poorly known. Mount Melbourne is remote, and thus renewed eruptions would likely not impact any human habitations but regional environmental or even global climate impacts, as well as disruptions of air travel, are possible.

Italian scientists began a volcanology research program on Mount Melbourne in the late 1980s, establishing a volcanological observatory in 1988. In 1990 they installed seismic stations around Mount Melbourne and between 1999 and 2001 a network of geodetic measurement stations around Terra Nova Bay, including several aimed at monitoring the Mount Melbourne volcano. Beginning in 2012 Korean scientists at the Jang Bogo Station added another seismic station network to monitor the volcano. In 2016–2019 geochemical, seismological and volcanological research was carried out at Mount Melbourne as part of the ICE-VOLC project.

== Geothermal activity ==
Geothermal activity occurs around the summit crater, on the upper parts of the volcano and on the northwestern slope between 2,400 and 2,500 metres (7,900 and 8,200 ft) elevation. Another geothermal area exists close to Edmonson Point, including fumaroles, thermal anomalies and freshwater ponds. Their temperatures of 15 to 20 °C (59 to 68 °F) are considerably higher than normal atmospheric temperatures in Antarctica. The geothermal areas are visible in infrared light from aircraft. Satellite images have identified areas with temperatures of over 100 to 200 °C (212 to 392 °F).

Individual geothermally heated areas cover surfaces of a few hectares. Typically, the soil consists of a thin sand layer with organic matter covering scoria gravel, but soils formed by meltwater-induced weathering also occur. In some places, the ground is too hot to be touched. Mount Melbourne is one of several volcanoes in Antarctica that feature such geothermal soils.

Fumarolic landforms include ice towers, (Note: Ice towers reach 1 to 6 metres (3 ft 3 in to 19 ft 8 in) width and 5 metres (16 ft) height. They are also known as "ice pinnacles" when they are not high. Ice pinnacles are hollow and sometimes large enough that people can fit in.) fumaroles, ice "roofs", caves in snow and firn, bare ground, ice hummocks surrounding fumarolic vents, puddles formed by condensed water vapour and steaming ground:

- Ice hummocks are hollow glacial structures that encase fumaroles. They reach heights of 4 metres (13 ft) and widths of 1 to 6 metres (3 to 20 ft). They mainly form over colder ground and widely spaced fumarolic vents.
- Ice towers are widespread around the caldera, especially in the north-northwestern and south-southeastern sectors, while warm ground is more restricted. In the northern sector of the volcano, ice towers and bare ground form a southeast–northwest trending lineament. Ice towers form when fumarolic gases freeze in the cold Antarctic air.
- Glacial caves form when geothermal heat melts ice, leaving cavities. Some of these caves are in the summit caldera and reach lengths of several hundred metres, with ceilings reaching 3 metres (9.8 ft) height. Several caves have been accessed through ice towers or through gaps where the ice surrounding the cave rests on rock, and one ice cave ("Aurora Ice Cave") was mapped in 2016.

The caves and ice towers release water-vapour-rich warm air. Fumarole temperatures can reach 60 °C (140 °F), contrasting with the cold air. Fumaroles release gases containing excesses of volcanic carbon dioxide, hydrogen and hydrogen sulfide, while the occurrence of methane is unclear. Hydrogen sulfide emissions are too low to prevent the development of vegetation. Yellow deposits have been identified as sulfur. The carbon dioxide emissions are significant, reaching about 8,355 tonnes per day (95.17 long ton/ks).

The geothermal manifestations appear to be powered mainly by steam, as there is no evidence of geothermal landforms related to liquid water flow and heat conduction is not effective enough at most sites. It is possible that underground liquid water reservoirs form in some areas, however. The steam is produced by the melting and evaporation of snow and ice, and is then channelled through rocks to the vents. Atmospheric air likely circulates underground and is heated, eventually exiting in ice towers. An early theory that the ice towers formed on top of a cooling lava flow is considered improbable given the long duration of fumarolic activity; a lava-heated system would have cooled down by now.

== Climate ==
There are no detailed meteorological records of the summit region. Winds blow mostly from the west and more rarely from the northwest. Catabatic winds blow from the Priestly and Reeves valleys. Precipitation is scarce. During winter, polar night lasts about three months. Temperatures in the summit region have been variously reported to either not exceed −30 °C (−22 °F) or to range between −6 and −20 °C (21 and −4 °F). Seasonal temperature variation is high and reaches 30 °C (54 °F).

During the Last Glacial Maximum (LGM), a marine ice sheet occupied Terra Nova Bay. The "Terra Nova Drift" was deposited between 25,000 and 7,000 years ago and is overlaid by later moraines from retreating ice during the post-LGM period. During the late Holocene after 5,000 years before present, glaciers advanced again as part of the Neoglacial. One minor advance occurred in the last c. 650 years.

== Life ==
Algae, (Note: Algae include both chlorophytes, cyanobacteria and lichen algae. Among the species identified are Aphanocapsa elachista, Chlorella emersonii, Chlorella reniformis, Coccomyxa gloeobotrydiformis, Coenocystis oleifera, Gloeocapsa magma, Hapalosiphon sp., Mastigocladus laminosus, Nostoc sp., Phormidium fragile, Pseudocoecomyxa simplex, Stigonema ocellatum and Tolypothrix bouteillei. Other genera are Chroococcus, Tolypothrix and Stygonema. Mastigocladus laminosus and Pseudocoecomyxa simplex are the dominant species at Mount Melbourne.) lichens, liverworts (Note: Cephaloziella exiliflora, Cephaloziella varians and Herzogobryum atrocapillum) and mosses (Note: Campylopus pyriformis and Pohlia nutans) grow on geothermally heated terrain on the upper parts of Mount Melbourne. Algae form crusts on the heated ground. Mosses form cushions and often occur around steam vents, in ice towers and under ice hummocks. The moss species Campylopus pyriformis does not grow leaves on Mount Melbourne. Pohlia nutans forms small shoots. The two moss species form separate stands which occur at different sites of the volcano. Together with occurrences at Mount Erebus, they constitute the highest mosses growing in Antarctica. Small peat deposits have been found.

Vegetation is particularly common on a ridge within and south of the main crater, "Cryptogam Ridge". (Note: Sometimes misspelled as "Cryptogram Ridge") It features a long snow-free area with a gravelly ground, small terraces and stone stripes. Soil temperatures recorded there reach 40 to 50 °C (104 to 122 °F). These are the only occurrences of Campylopus pyriformis on warm ground in Antarctica.

Mount Melbourne along with Mount Erebus, Mount Rittmann and Deception Island is one of four volcanoes in Antarctica known for having geothermal habitats, although other poorly studied volcanoes such as Mount Berlin, Mount Hampton and Mount Kauffman may also have them. In South America, high-elevation geothermal environments similar to Mount Melbourne are found at Socompa. Vegetation on geothermally heated terrain is unusual in Antarctica but other occurs elsewhere, including on Bouvet, Deception Island, Mount Erebus and the South Sandwich Islands.

The geothermal area at the summit of Mount Melbourne makes up Antarctic Specially Protected Area 118, which contains two specially restricted areas around Cryptogam Ridge and some markers used in studies of volcano deformation. Some algae from Mount Melbourne were accidentally transferred to Deception Island or Mount Erebus.

Edmonson Point and Cape Washington have Adelie penguin and emperor penguin rookeries and south polar skuas and Weddel seals are also found. More than twenty-four lichen plus six moss species (including Bryum argenteum moss) have been found at Edmonson Point, as well as microbial mats formed by cyanobacteria. Nematodes and collembola complete the biota of Edmonson Point.

=== Biology ===
The vegetation on Mount Melbourne grows mainly on terrain heated to temperatures of over 10 to 20 °C (50 to 68 °F), and there are gradations in vegetation type from colder to warmer temperatures. There are differences between the vegetation and bacterial communities at Cryptogam Ridge and those on the northwest slope of Mount Melbourne; distinct soils may be the reason for such differences.

These communities must have reached Mount Melbourne from far away. Transport was probably by wind as there is no flowing water in the region. Mount Melbourne was recently active, has a polar night lasting thirteen weeks, only small areas are supplied by meltwater, has soils containing toxic elements such as mercury, is distant from ecosystems that could be the source of colonization events, and lies away from the westerlies (Note: The westerlies are the belts of westerly winds that lie outside of the tropics.), which may explain why the vegetation is species-poor. Pohlia nutans may have arrived only recently on Mount Melbourne, or this volcano is not as favourable for its growth as Mount Rittmann, where this moss is more common. Its colonies are less vigorous on Mount Melbourne than Campylopus pyriformis.

Condensing fumarole gases and meltwater from snow form the water supply of this vegetation. Mosses are concentrated around fumarolic vents as there is more fresh water available there. The steam freezes in the cold air, forming the ice hummocks that act as a shelter and maintain stable humidity and temperature. The geothermal heating and the availability of freshwater sets these volcanic biological communities apart from other Antarctic vegetation communities that are heated by the sun.

Some bacterial species are nitrogen fixing. Genetic analysis has found that some mosses at Mount Melbourne are mutating, yielding genetic variation. The hot, wet soils at Mount Melbourne host thermophilic organisms, making Mount Melbourne an island of thermophilic life on an ice-cold continent. Cold-tolerant microbes coexist with the thermophiles.

Other species associated with the vegetation are the protozoan Corythion dubium, which is a testate amoeba common in Antarctica and the only invertebrate found in the geothermal habitats of Mount Melbourne, actinobacteria and various actinomycetes and fungal (Note: The species Aureobasidium pullulans, Chaetomium gracile and Penicillium brevicompactum have been found in association with mosses. Other fungi reported are Acremonium charticola, Chaetomium sp., Cryptococcus, Mucor and Penicillium.) genera. Several microbial species were first described from Mount Melbourne's geothermal terrains:

- Alicyclobacillus pohliae from the northwest slope.
- Aneurinibacillus terranovensis from Cryptogam Ridge and also from Mount Rittmann volcano.
- Bacillus fumarioli from Cryptogam Ridge.
- Bacillus thermoantarcticus from Cryptogam Ridge, later renamed to Bacillus thermantarcticus. A further reclassification to Geobacillus thermantarcticus was proposed in 2012.
- Brevibacillus levickii from the northwest slope.
- Victoriomyces antarcticus is an ascomycete fungus that was discovered at Melbourne.

== See also ==
- List of Ultras of Antarctica
- List of volcanoes in Antarctica
