= The Pleiades (volcano group) =

Antarctic volcano group

- Location within Antarctica

Highest point
- Elevation: 3,040 m (9,970 ft)
- Coordinates: 72°40′S 165°30′E

Geography
- Location: Victoria Land, Antarctica

Geology
- Volcanic belt: McMurdo Volcanic Group
- Last eruption: 1050 BCE ± 14,000 years

The Pleiades are a volcanic group in northern Victoria Land of Antarctica. It consists of youthful cones and domes with Mount Atlas/Mount Pleiones, a small stratovolcano formed by three overlapping cones, being the dominant volcano and rising 500 m (1,600 ft) above the Evans Névé plateau. Two other named cones are Alcyone Cone and Taygete Cone, the latter of which has been radiometrically dated to have erupted during the Holocene. A number of tephra layers across Antarctica have been attributed to eruptions of this volcanic group, including several that may have occurred within the last few hundred years.

== Geography and geomorphology ==
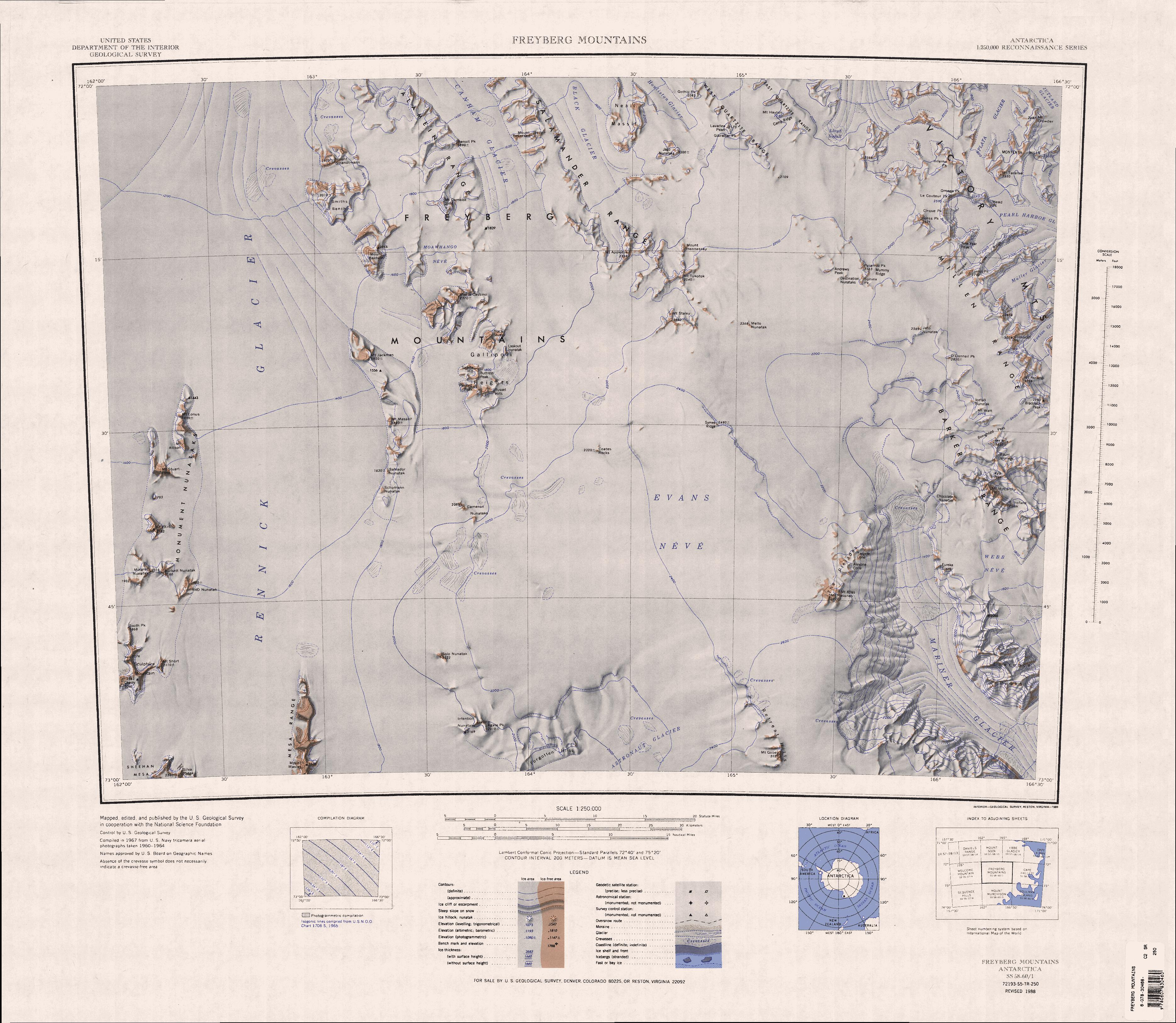
The Pleiades in south east of map

The Pleiades are located at the crest of the Transantarctic Mountains, 120 to 140 km (75 to 87 mi) away from the coast of Lady Newnes Bay, Ross Sea. The volcanoes are located between Evans Neve and the beginning of Mariner Glacier, which drains Evans Neve southeastwards towards the Ross Sea. The volcanic group is named after the Pleiades star cluster in the constellation Taurus; the name was assigned to them by the New Zealand Geological Survey Antarctic Expedition.

The volcanic group is formed by at least 12 steep, small volcanic cones and lava domes that emerge from the ice of Evans Neve over a 13 km (8.1 mi) long area. Most are nameless with the exception of the central Taygete Cone, Alcyone Cone just south of Taygete and the pair of c. 3,020 m (9,910 ft) high Mount Pleiones and c. 3,040 m (9,970 ft) high Mount Atlas in the southern sector. Mount Atlas and Mount Pleiones form a compound stratovolcano which is the principal volcano of The Pleiades and rises about 500 metres (1,600 ft) above the ice. Mount Atlas is formed by three separate cones that rise 0.5 km (0.31 mi) above the ice. Dykes, lava and scoria flows are found on these cones, the youngest of which has a semicircular crater. and scoria cones dot its flanks. At the foot of Mount Atlas are moraines with the form of ridges and there are moraines within one of its craters as well. The summit of Mount Pleiones features nested craters. The distribution of the cones may mark the edges of a buried caldera.

Alcyone Cone lies 3.5 km (2.2 mi) north of Mount Atlas. It is only slightly lower than Mount Atlas but is much smaller. It has two poorly defined craters and consists of lava flows covered with scree and volcanic bombs when not buried under snow. Taygete Cone 6 km (3.7 mi) north of Mount Atlas appears to be a lava dome bearing traces of hydrothermal alteration and of a small crater. Apart from the lava flows which make up most of Mount Atlas, pyroclastic rocks have been encountered at The Pleiades. The other cones are partly buried by snow and some have breached or otherwise eroded craters.

The volcanoes have alternatively been described as eroded or uneroded. The young appearance of the edifices indicates a young age of The Pleiades volcanoes. The volcanoes have been prospected for the possibility to generate geothermal energy but the presence of a good heat source is unlikely. An aeromagnetic anomaly has been correlated to the volcano group. The cones form an arcuate alignment that might reflect the existence of a 6 kilometres (3.7 mi) wide caldera to their southeast.

== Geology ==
The Pleiades belong to the McMurdo Volcanic Group and more specifically to the Melbourne volcanic province, which extends from Mount Melbourne to The Pleiades and Malta Plateau. These consist of the Cenozoic volcanoes of northern Victoria Land which form alignments and lineaments possibly controlled by deep fractures, and which are subdivided into a "Central Suite" consisting of large stratovolcanoes and a "Local Suite" consisting of other volcanic centres. Among the volcanoes of the McMurdo Volcanic Group are the large volcanoes Mount Overlord, Mount Melbourne and in the area of The Pleiades the Malta Plateau. Volcanic activity began about 10 – 7 million years ago. Earlier volcanic activity began during the Cretaceous, when the West Antarctic Rift System became active.

The crust under the volcanic field is about 40 kilometres (25 mi) thick. The basement underneath the volcanoes consists of Precambrian and Paleozoic sedimentary and intrusive rocks. The former are mostly represented by the Bowers Group/Bowers Supergroup and the Robertson Bay Group north of the volcanic complex and the latter by the Granite Harbour and Admiralty Intrusives mostly south of the volcanic complex. A major local fault system passes northeast of the volcanoes and roughly follows the path of the Mariner Glacier, while the Lanternman Fault passes southwest of them. Some of these faults formed during the Ross Orogeny, when three terranes collided to form northern Victoria Land; The Pleiades are located on the Bowers Terrane. Faults may also govern the position of The Pleiades volcanoes.

=== Composition ===
Basanite, basalt, benmoreite, hawaiite, phonolite, trachyandesite, trachyte and tristanite have been recovered from The Pleiades. These volcanic rocks define two separate sodium and potassium-rich magma suites and may originate from separate levels of the same magma chamber, different depths or through fractional crystallization. Ultimately, these magmas originate from a metasomatized mantle and were altered through assimilation of crustal material as they ascended. Overall, these volcanic rocks define one of the most complete magmatic series of the McMurdo Volcanic Group. It is possible that the volcanoes first erupted trachyte and later basalts, but later findings indicate that the two suites were erupted simultaneously. Phenocrysts include anorthoclase, apatite, augite, biotite, kaersutite, magnetite, oligoclase and olivine, and are distinct between the sodic and potassic rocks. Essexite, granodiorite, granite and syenite xenoliths also occur. Hydrothermal alteration at Taygete Cone has produced hematite and sulfur which coat and stain bleached trachyte.

== Eruption history ==
The oldest dated rocks are 847,000 ± 12,000 years old. Eruptions took place about 825,000 years ago and emplaced trachytes in the central part of the field; even older eruptions may have occurred but are now buried underneath of snow and ice. Three more eruptions occurred in the subsequent 700,000 years before activity began to increase after 100,000 years. potassium–argon dating has yielded imprecise ages of 40,000 ± 50,000 for Mount Atlas and 20,000 ± 40,000 and 12,000 ± 40,000 for other volcanic cones. Later argon-argon dating has yielded ages of less than 100,000 years for lavas on Mount Atlas and for a lava east of Taygete, and ages of about 45,000 years for Alcyone and two more lava flows on Mount Atlas. The Pleiones-Atlas complex may have last erupted 20,000 ± 7,000 years ago. Volcanic activity may have been influenced by ice load, which prevented the ascent of the magmas and allowed them to accumulate and evolve in the crust, yielding peculiar magmas that underwent intense crystal fractionation and absorbed large quantities of crustal material. When ice loads decreases, the evolved magmas rise to the surface.

Tephra deposits have been found in Antarctica which may originate at The Pleiades. These include:

- Eemian-age tephras in Taylor Glacier and Talos Dome, although some of the latter may originate at Mount Rittmann instead.
- One tephra layer emplaced about 50,000 years ago at a blue-ice area at Frontier Mountain.
- Several tens of thousands of years old tephra layers at Lewis Cliff/Beardmore Glacier probably originate at The Pleiades.
- 26,000 – 22,000 years old tephra in the Ross Sea, which was emplaced when part of the Ross Sea was ice-free.
- 16,000 – 15,000 years old tephra layers in Talos Dome.
- Tephra layers at Hercules Neve and Talos Dome, of probably Holocene age.
- A volcanic glass layer at Siple Dome dated to 1286 – 1292 AD. A tephra layer from 1254 AD was later correlated to Mount Rittmann.
- Tephras in ice cores that date to 1776 – 1885 AD, including one tephra layer at Siple Dome dated to about 1809.
- Finally, a major eruption may have occurred either at The Pleiades or at Mount Melbourne between 1880 and 1980.

The youngest ages of 6,000 ± 6,000 and 3,000 ± 14,000 years ago have been obtained on Taygete, which together with the youthful texture of this dome indicates a young age for The Pleiades, despite the imprecise dates. The presence of pumice lapilli has been taken as evidence of very recent activity in the form of a moderate pumice eruption. Presently, only minor fumarolic activity has been reported. Future eruptions are possible and The Pleiades are not monitored, but they are also remote from any research station.

== Features ==
Named geographical features include, from south to north:

- Mount Pleiones, 72°45′S 165°29′E, the southernmost and highest peak of The Pleiades. Named by the New Zealand Antarctic Place-Names Committee (NZ-APC) after Pleione of Greek mythology.
- Mount Atlas, 72°44′S 165°30′E, at the northeast side of Mount Pleiones. Named by the NZ-APC in association with Mount Pleiones after Atlas of Greek mythology.
- Alcyone Cone, 72°42′S 165°33′E, near the center of The Pleiades. Named by a Victoria University of Wellington Antarctic Expedition (VUWAE) field party to Evans Névé, 1971–72, after Alcyone, the brightest star in the Pleiades constellation.
- Taygete Cone, 72°41′S 165°34′E, northeast of Alcyone Cone in the north part of The Pleiades. Named by the NZ-APC after Taygete (Taygeta), one of the stars in the Pleiades.

== See also ==
- List of volcanoes in Antarctica

== Sources ==
- Alberts, Fred G., ed. (1995), Geographic Names of the Antarctic (PDF) (2 ed.), United States Board on Geographic Names This article incorporates public domain material from websites or documents of the United States Board on Geographic Names.
- Esser, R.P.; Kyle, Philip (January 2002). "^{40}Ar/^{39}Ar chronology of the McMurdo Volcanic Group at The Pleiades, northern Victoria Land, Antarctica". Royal Society of New Zealand Bulletin. 35: 415–418. ISSN 1176-1865 – via ResearchGate.
- Faure, Gunter; Mensing, Teresa M. (2011). The Transantarctic Mountains. Dordrecht: Springer Netherlands. doi:10.1007/978-90-481-9390-5. ISBN 978-1-4020-8406-5.
- Kim, Jihyuk; Park, Jung-Woo; Lee, Mi Jung; Lee, Jong Ik; Kyle, Philip R. (2019-01-01). "Evolution of Alkalic Magma Systems: Insight from Coeval Evolution of Sodic and Potassic Fractionation Lineages at The Pleiades Volcanic Complex, Antarctica". Journal of Petrology. 60 (1): 117–150. Bibcode:2019JPet...60..117K. doi:10.1093/petrology/egy108. ISSN 0022-3530. S2CID 134730691.
- Kim, Jihyuk; Lee, Mi Jung; Lee, Jong Ik; Kyle, Philip R.; Wang, Xia; Wang, Zaicong; Park, Jung-Woo (October 2023). "Sulfide minerals and chalcophile elements in The Pleiades Volcanic Field, Antarctica: implications for the distribution of chalcophile metals in continental intraplate alkaline magma systems". Contributions to Mineralogy and Petrology. 178 (10): 67. Bibcode:2023CoMP..178...67K. doi:10.1007/s00410-023-02048-2. S2CID 261559871.
- Kyle, Philip (January 1982). "Volcanic geology of the Pleiades, northern Victoria Land, Antarctica". In Craddock, C. (ed.). Antarctic Geoscience. Madison, WI: University of Wisconsin Press. pp. 747–754. ISBN 9780299084103 – via ResearchGate.
- Lee, Mi Jung; Kyle, Philip R.; Iverson, Nels A.; Lee, Jong Ik; Han, Yeongcheol (2019-09-01). "Rittmann volcano, Antarctica as the source of a widespread 1252 ± 2 CE tephra layer in Antarctica ice". Earth and Planetary Science Letters. 521: 169–176. Bibcode:2019E&PSL.521..169L. doi:10.1016/j.epsl.2019.06.002. ISSN 0012-821X. S2CID 198411649.
- LeMasurier, W.E.; Thomson, J.W.; Baker, P.E.; Kyle, P.R.; Rowley, P.D.; Smellie, J.L.; Verwoerd, W.J., eds. (1990). Volcanoes of the Antarctic Plate and Southern Oceans. Antarctic Research Series. Vol. 48. Washington, D. C.: American Geophysical Union. doi:10.1029/ar048. ISBN 978-0-87590-172-5.
- Riddolls, B. W.; Hancox, G. T. (1 November 1968). "The geology of the upper Mariner Glacier region, North Victoria Land, Antarctica". New Zealand Journal of Geology and Geophysics. 11 (4): 881–899. Bibcode:1968NZJGG..11..881R. doi:10.1080/00288306.1968.10420758. ISSN 0028-8306.
- Rocchi, Irene; Tomassini, Alice; Masotta, Matteo; Petrelli, Maurizio; Ágreda López, Mónica; Rocchi, Sergio (1 April 2024). "Textures and Chemistry of Crystal Cargo of the Pleiades Volcanic Field, Antarctica: Potential Influence of Ice Load in Modulating the Plumbing System". Journal of Petrology. 65 (4). doi:10.1093/petrology/egae027.
- Smellie, John L.; Rocchi, Sergio (2021). "Chapter 5.1a Northern Victoria Land: volcanology". Geological Society, London, Memoirs. 55 (1): 347–381. doi:10.1144/M55-2018-60. ISSN 0435-4052. S2CID 233887403.
- Stump, Edmund, ed. (1986). Geological Investigations in Northern Victoria Land. Antarctic Research Series. Vol. 46. Washington, D. C.: American Geophysical Union. doi:10.1029/ar046. ISBN 978-0-87590-197-8.
