= McMurdo Volcanic Group =

Group of volcanic rocks in the Ross Sea and Transantarctic Mountains in Antarctica

- Stratigraphic range: Cenozoic
- Type: Group
- Unit of: Western Ross Supergroup
- Sub-units: Erebus Volcanic Province, Hallett Volcanic Province, Melbourne Volcanic Province

Lithology
- Primary: Volcanic rocks

Location
- Region: Antarctica

The McMurdo Volcanic Group is a large group of Cenozoic volcanic rocks in the western Ross Sea and central Transantarctic Mountains areas of Antarctica. It is one of the largest provinces of alkaline volcanism in the world, having formed as a result of continental rifting along the West Antarctic Rift System. The McMurdo Volcanic Group is part of the Western Ross Supergroup, a stratigraphic unit that also includes the Meander Intrusive Group.

== Subdivisions ==
Three subprovinces comprise the McMurdo Volcanic Group, namely the Hallett, Melbourne and Erebus volcanic provinces. The Balleny Volcanic Province along the Balleny fracture zone in the Southern Ocean was originally defined as a part of the McMurdo Volcanic Group but it is now excluded due to its location on oceanic crust with no obvious geographic or tectonic relationship to the other McMurdo volcanic provinces.

=== Hallett Volcanic Province ===
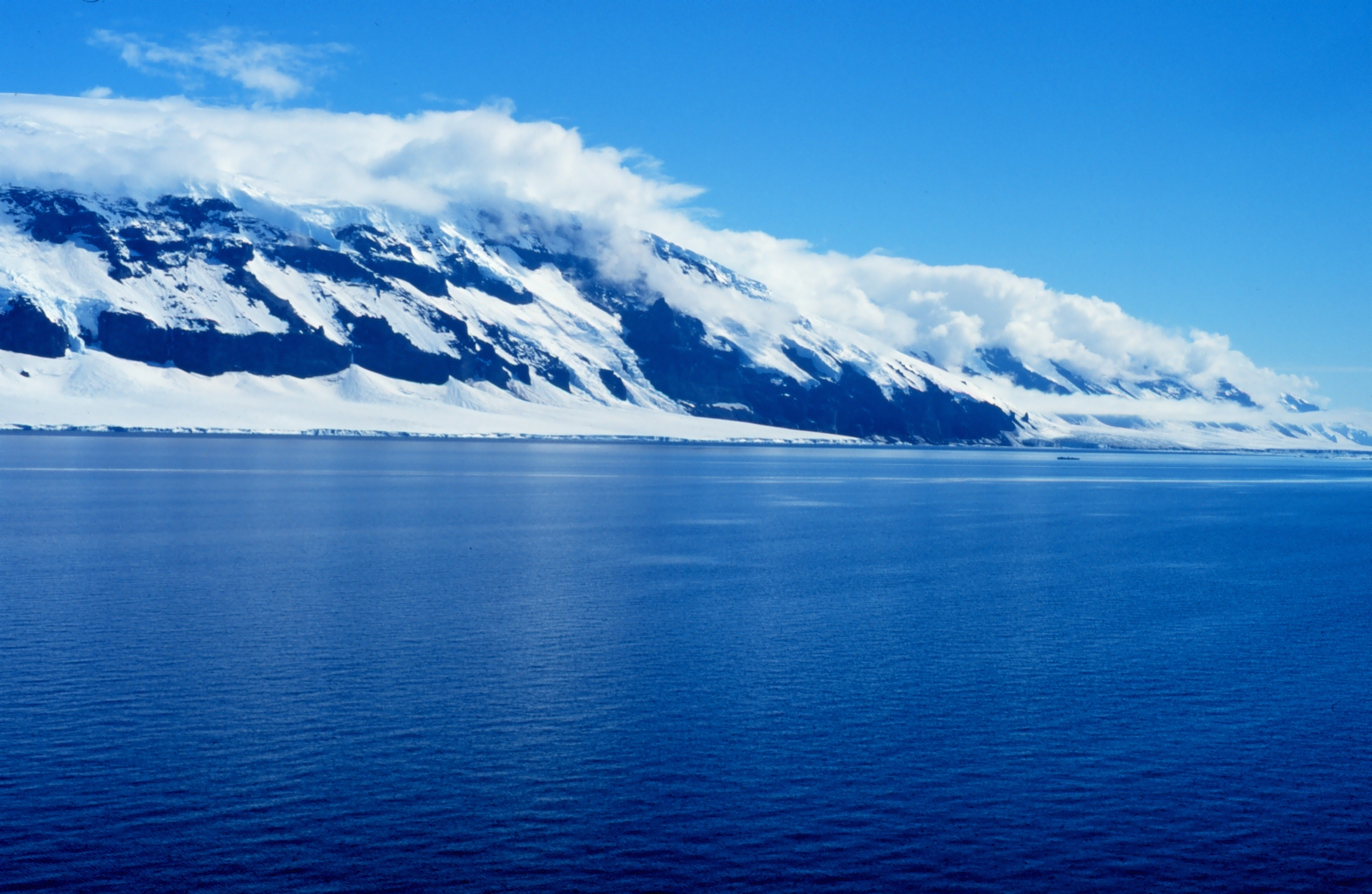
Coulman Island in the Ross Sea is part of the Hallett Volcanic Province.

The Hallett Volcanic Province in northern Victoria Land is situated along the margin of the Transantarctic Mountains. It consists of a 260 km (160 mi) long chain of four major elongated shield volcano complexes that were originally interpreted to have erupted subglacially under a larger Antarctic ice sheet. Later studies showed that they erupted in a subaerial environment instead.

==== Volcanoes ====
- Adare Peninsula
  - Hanson Peak
  - Hargreaves Peak
- Coulman Island
  - Hawkes Heights
- Daniell Peninsula
  - Mount Brewster
  - Mount Lubbock
  - Mount Prior
  - Tousled Peak
- Hallett Peninsula
  - Quarterdeck Ridge
  - Redcastle Ridge
  - Mount Vernon Harcourt

=== Melbourne Volcanic Province ===
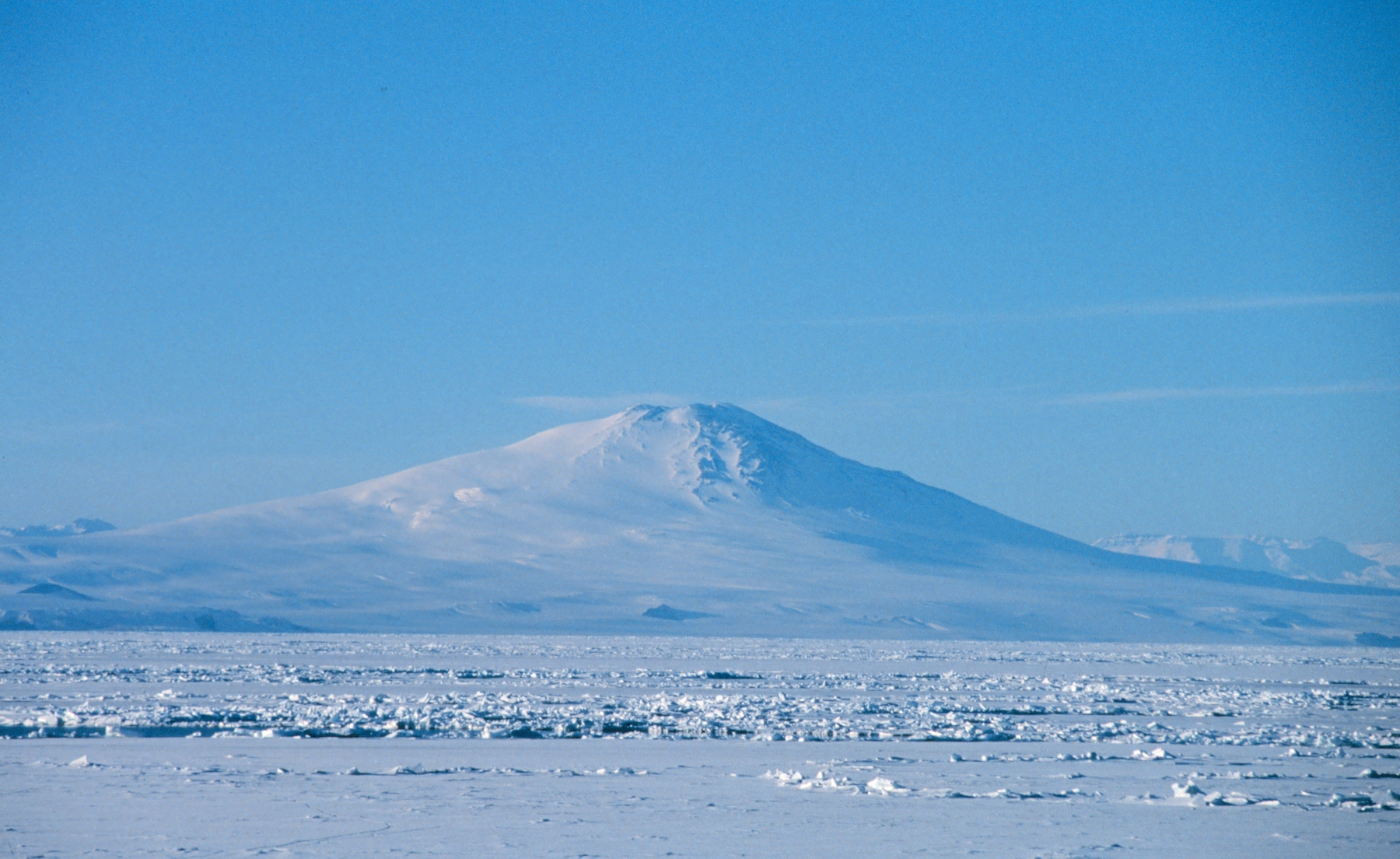
Mount Melbourne seen from the ice-covered Ross Sea. It is part of the Melbourne Volcanic Province.

The Melbourne Volcanic Province is also in northern Victoria Land and forms an arcuate band extending from the Ross Sea coast into the Transantarctic Mountains. It consists of large volcanic centres and small but widely distributed basaltic vents.

==== Volcanoes ====
- Mount Abbott
- Baker Rocks
- Malta Plateau
- Markham Island
- Mount Melbourne
- Nathan Hills
- Mount Noice
- Mount Overlord
  - Parasite Cone
- The Pleiades
  - Alcyone Cone
  - Mount Pleiones
  - Taygete Cone
- Random Hills
- Mount Rittmann
- Shield Nunatak

=== Erebus Volcanic Province ===
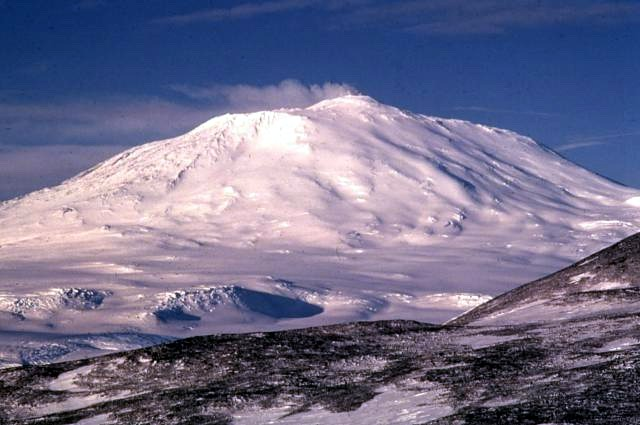
Mount Erebus on Ross Island is part of the Erebus Volcanic Province.

The Erebus Volcanic Province is in southern Victoria Land. It includes marine volcanic centres in the southwest Ross Sea, major volcanic complexes in southern McMurdo Sound and several small basaltic centres in the McMurdo Dry Valleys, as well as along the foothills of the Royal Society Range.

==== Volcanoes ====
- Beaufort Island
- Black Island
  - Mount Aurora
  - Mount Melania
- Brandau Crater
- Brown Peninsula
- Mount Discovery
- Franklin Island
- Mount Morning
- Ross Island
  - Mount Bird
  - Black Knob
  - Boulder Cones
  - Castle Rock
  - Mount Erebus
  - First Crater
  - Half Moon Crater
  - Observation Hill
  - Second Crater
  - Mount Terror
  - Twin Crater
- White Island

== See also ==
- List of volcanoes in Antarctica
