= Mount Vernon Harcourt =

Volcano in Victoria Land, Antarctica

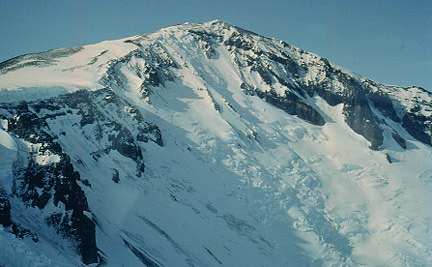
- Mount Vernon Harcourt in 1964

Highest point
- Elevation: 1,570 m (5,150 ft)
- Coordinates: 72°32′S 169°55′E

Geography
- Location within Antarctica
- Location: Hallett Peninsula, Antarctica

Geology
- Rock age(s): Oldest dated rock: 5.5 and 6.6 million years
- Mountain type: Stratovolcano

Mount Vernon Harcourt, also unofficially known as Mount Harcourt, is a conical stratovolcano, that rises over 1,535 meters, making up part of the Hallett Peninsula extending into the Ross Sea about 375 mi (604 km) south of Mount Erebus, along with three overlapping shield volcanoes. The mountain was discovered in January 1841 by Sir James Clark Ross and named by him for the Reverend William Vernon Harcourt, one of the founders of the British Association.

Mount Vernon Harcourt is part of the Hallett Volcanic Province of the McMurdo Volcanic Group. Two dates have been obtained from the volcano's rock, roughly 5.5 and 6.6 million years in age. These samples are alkalic in composition.

== See also ==
- List of volcanoes in Antarctica
