= Cotter Cliffs =

Cliffs of Antarctica

Coordinates: 72°28′S 170°18′E

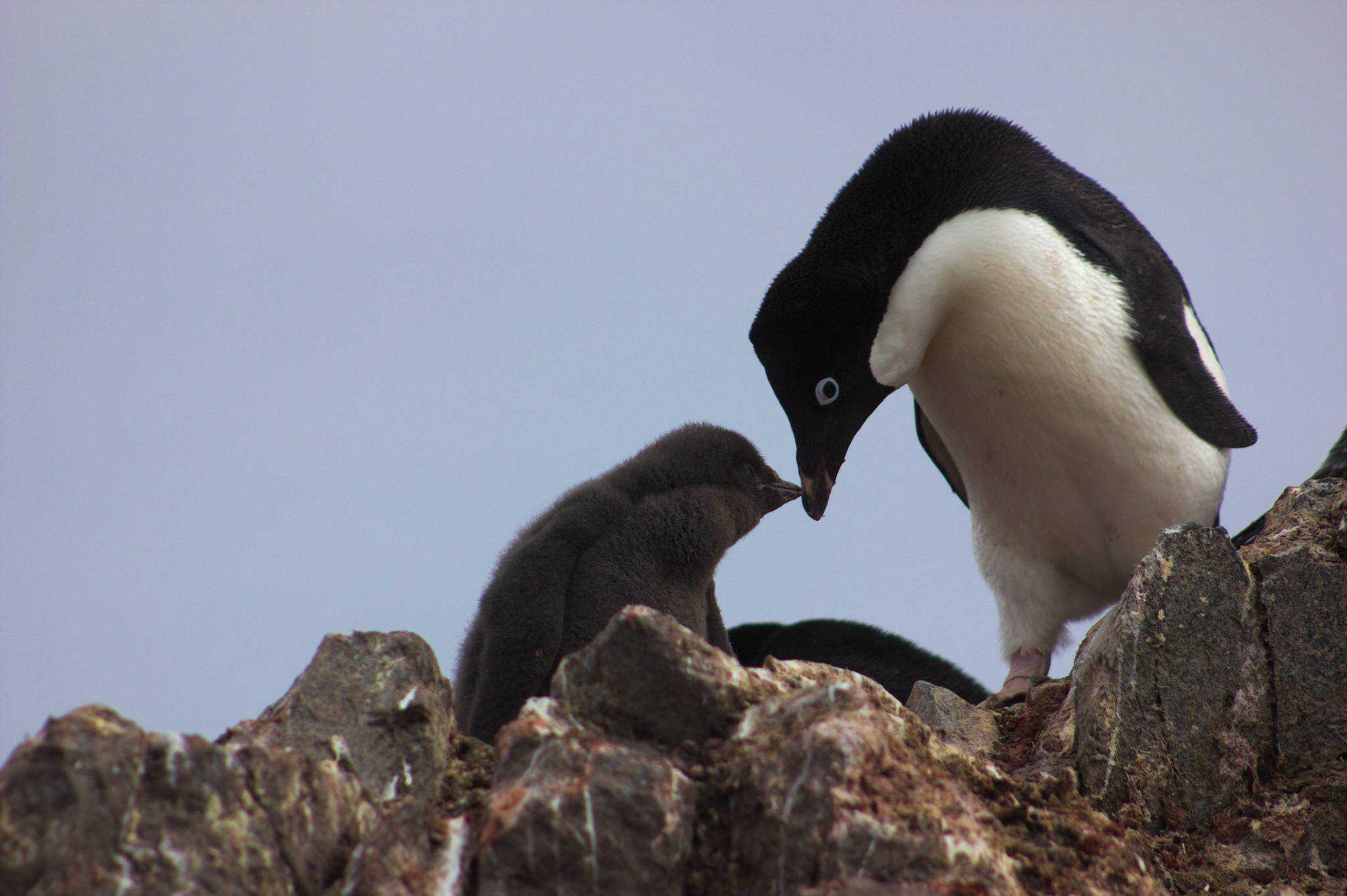
Large numbers of Adélie penguins breed in the IBA

The Cotter Cliffs are a line of spectacular bare rock cliffs rising 1,500 metres (5,000 ft) above the Ross Sea and forming the seaward (eastern) face of the Hallett Peninsula, in Victoria Land. A cape in this vicinity was named "Cape Cotter" in 1841 by Sir James Clark Ross, after Pownall Pellew Cotter, master on HMS Terror. No prominent cape exists along the east side of Hallett Peninsula, but the name Cotter has been retained for the cliffs in the same general area.

== Important Bird Area ==
The site has been designated an Important Bird Area (IBA) by BirdLife International because it supports a colony of about 38,000 breeding pairs of Adélie penguins.
