= Mount Rittmann =

Volcano in Antarctica

- Location within Antarctica

Highest point
- Elevation: 2,600 m (8,500 ft)
- Coordinates: 73.45°S 165.5°E

Naming
- Etymology: Volcanologist Alfred Rittmann

Geography
- Parent range: Mountaineer Range

Geology
- Rock age: Pliocene
- Mountain type: Volcano
- Volcanic belt: McMurdo Volcanic Group
- Last eruption: >1254 CE

Mount Rittmann is a volcano in Antarctica. Discovered in 1988–1989 by an Italian expedition, it was named after the volcanologist Alfred Rittmann (1893–1980). It features a 2 kilometres (1.2 mi) or 8 by 5 kilometres (5.0 mi × 3.1 mi) wide caldera which crops out from underneath the Aviator Glacier. The volcano was active during the Pliocene and into the Holocene, including large explosive eruptions; a major eruption occurred in 1254 CE and deposited tephra over much of Antarctica. Currently, the volcano is classified as dormant.

The volcano is fumarolically active. The geothermal activity keeps part of the caldera ice-free; mosses and various microorganisms grow on this ice-free terrain. Such an occurrence of mosses on fumarolically active volcanoes of Antarctica is limited to Mount Rittmann, Mount Melbourne and Mount Erebus and has led to efforts to establish a protected area on the volcano.

== Geography and geomorphology ==
It lies in Victoria Land on the Ross Sea, 100 kilometres (62 mi) from Terranova Bay and 150 kilometres (93 mi) from the Italian Mario Zucchelli Station. It was discovered by an Italian expedition in 1988–1989 and named in honour of the volcanologist Alfred Rittmann. Owing to having only been recently discovered and being remote, the volcano is poorly studied.

Mount Rittmann is 2,600 metres (8,500 ft) high and lies in the Mountaineer Range. A 2 kilometres (1.2 mi) or 8 by 5 kilometres (5.0 mi × 3.1 mi) wide caldera is located underneath the Aviator Glacier; it is outlined by a ring of volcanic hills and outcrops that emerge slightly from an almost flat surrounding terrain. The name Mt. Rittmann is sometimes applied to a fumarolically active nunatak on the caldera rim. The base of the volcano crops out from the Pilot Glacier, which together with the caldera is one of the few parts of the otherwise snow- and ice-covered volcano that aren't encased in ice. Outcrops consist of hyaloclastites, lava flows and pillow lavas.

=== Fumaroles and their ecosystems ===
An Italian expedition in 1990–1991 discovered heated ground and fumaroles at the caldera, implying that molten magma exists underneath the volcano. The fumarolic activity occurs at a 200 metres (660 ft) wide and 80 metres (260 ft) high face with sandy-gravelly soil; another warm area is reported from the lower slopes.

The vents of the fumaroles are centimetres wide and surrounded by efflorescences formed by hydrothermally altered rocks. Fumarolic gases contain carbon dioxide and methane and lack hydrogen sulfide and sulfur dioxide. The fumaroles keep an area of the caldera at 2,250 metres (7,380 ft) elevation ice-free; at 2,100 metres (6,900 ft) elevation mean temperatures are −20 °C (−4 °F), but fumarolic activity heats the surrounding rocks up to 60 °C (140 °F). Surface temperatures reach 43.4 °C (110.1 °F).

Patches of moss grow in rosette form on sandy soil in the fumarolic areas at temperatures of 17–35 °C (63–95 °F). A steady supply of water, the fumarolic warmth and shelter allow the growth of this vegetation; such volcanic vegetation is also found at volcanoes Mount Erebus and Mount Melbourne. The mosses may have arrived there by wind; Pohlia nutans, the moss found at Mount Rittmann, is a cosmopolitan species which is also encountered elsewhere in Victoria Land. Genetic analysis indicates that the mosses growing at Mount Rittmann arrived there in one event and are not diverse.

Research on microbial communities at Mount Rittmann fumaroles has found bacteria including cyanobacteria, fungi including yeast and cyanobacterial microbial mats. Algae and protozoa have been identified at Mount Rittmann fumaroles. The bacterial species Anoxybacillus amylolyticus and the subspecies Alicyclobacillus acidocaldarius subsp. rittmannii were discovered at fumaroles of Mount Rittmann, and the bacterium Bacillus fumarioli was cultured from Mount Rittmann and Mount Melbourne. Alicyclobacillus acidocaldarius subsp. rittmannii is used in studied of thermophilic enzymes. Another thermophilic bacteria reported from Mount Rittmann is Aneurinibacillus terranovensis.

Together with Deception Island, Mount Erebus and Mount Melbourne, Mount Rittmann is one of the four volcanoes in Antarctica with known geothermal habitats and the least studied of these. Three other volcanoes show evidence of past or present fumarolic activity.

There are efforts by Antarctica New Zealand to establish an Antarctic Specially Protected Area (ASPA) on Mount Rittmann, and in 2014 Mount Rittmann was reportedly part of ASPA 175.

== Geology ==
The volcano is part of the McMurdo Volcanic Group, one of the largest provinces of alkaline volcanism in the world. It has been subdivided into four subprovinces; Mount Rittmann is considered part of the Melbourne subprovince or of the Mount Overlord volcanic field. The volcanic province is related to the tectonic events that occurred during the rifting of the Ross Sea. Activity commenced during the Eocene-Oligocene and continued into the Holocene.

The outcrops around the caldera rim are formed by breccia, which contains juvenile pumice and xenoliths. The volcanic rocks define a basanitic, hawaiitic, mugearitic, phonolithic and trachytic suite that is alkaline and sodic and features olivine and plagioclase phenocrysts. Xenoliths include both granite and metamorphic rocks from the basement and volcanic rocks. Hydrothermal alteration has occurred close to the fumaroles.

== Eruption history ==
The volcano is of Pliocene age and was active between 4 million years ago and 70,000 years ago, although the oldest rocks may actually be from a separate volcano. Radiometric dating has yielded ages of 3.97 million years for rocks at the base of Mount Rittmann and 240,000 ± 200,000, 170,000 ± 20,000 and 70,000 ± 20,000 years ago for lava flows. The caldera appears to be younger than the volcanic rocks at Pilot Glacier, although its unimpressive topographical expression might indicate an old age. It was possibly formed by a Plinian eruption. Tephra deposits at Outback Nunataks, various marine and ice core tephras, Eemian-age tephras at Talos Dome in East Antarctica and dust bands found in blue-ice areas of Frontier Mountain and Lichen Hill in Victoria Land may originate from Mount Rittmann, and at least four large eruptions took place in the last 74,000 years. The eruption history of the volcano is poorly known due to the scarcity of outcrops.

About 11,000 years ago, Mount Rittmann had a large explosive eruption which deposited the "Aviator Tephra" in the Aviator Basin of the Ross Sea. Reconstructions imply that the eruption commenced as a hydromagmatic event which then transitioned into a Plinian eruption which yielded lapilli and volcanic ash. Presumably, the volcano was ice-clad when the eruption commenced and meltwater from the ice interacted with the magma to trigger hydromagmatic activity. At the end, a caldera collapse may have occurred, and the volcano produced ignimbrites.

Tephrochronology has found evidence that Mount Rittmann erupted in 1254 and deposited a tephra layer across Antarctica. This Rittmann tephra or "1254 C.E. tephra" has been identified in ice cores of East and West Antarctica; its discovery at Edisto Inlet expands its occurrence to an area of over 950,000 square kilometres (370,000 sq mi) all around the volcano and to distances of over 2,000 kilometres (1,200 mi). Magma was efficiently fragmented during the eruption, which may or may not have been intense. It probably was one of the largest Holocene eruptions of Antarctica, although it was exceeded in size by Rittmann's 11,000 and 22,000 eruptions and did not produce much sulfur. Originally, it was attributed to The Pleiades volcanoes before its source at Mount Rittmann was discovered.

Additional eruptions may have occurred after 1254. Presently, the volcano is considered quiescent and is not monitored although a seismo-tectonic station was installed in its vicinity and has recorded seismic activity, some of which may be due to ice movements and the other of volcanic origin. Small thermal anomalies have been observed from Landsat satellite images and may correspond to fumarolic activity. A repeat of the 1254 eruption could form a long-lasting ash cloud, ashfall on nearby research stations and disruption of air traffic to and from McMurdo Station.
