= List of volcanoes in Antarctica =

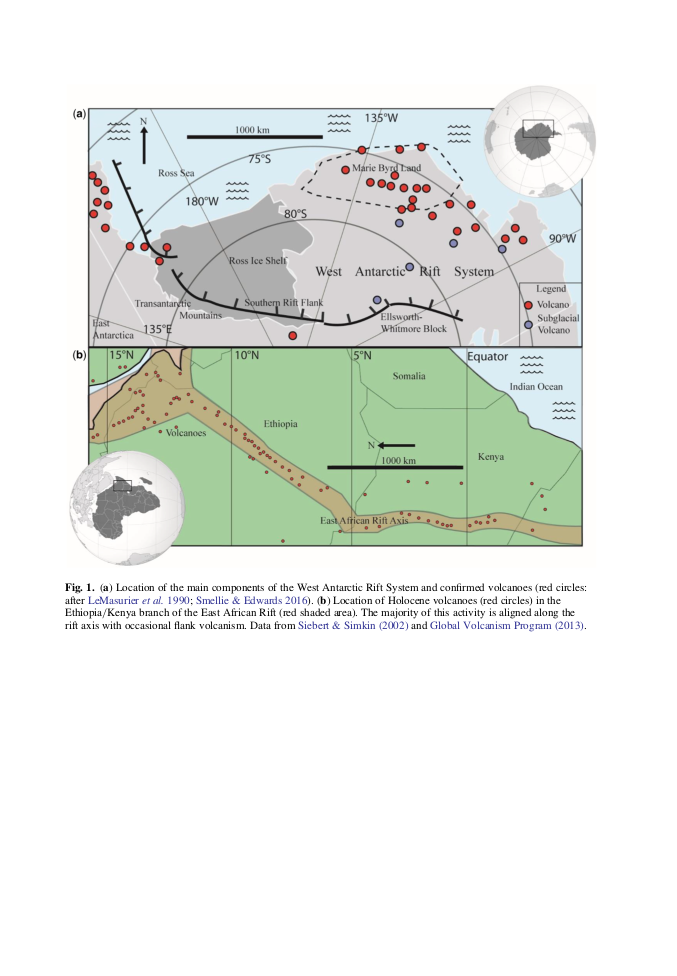

This is a list of volcanoes in Antarctica.

== Table ==
A 2017 study claimed to have found 138 volcanoes, of which 91 were previously unknown. Some volcanoes are entirely under the ice sheet. Unconfirmed volcanoes are not included in the table below.

Name	Elevation		Location	Last known eruption
Name	meters	feet	Coordinates	Last known eruption
Mount Abbott	1,020	3,346	74°42′S 163°50′E	
Adare Peninsula	2,083	6,832	71°40′S 170°30′E	Pleistocene
Mount Andrus	2,978	9,768	75°48′S 132°14′W	Unknown
Argo Point	360	1,181	66°15′S 60°55′W	0.9 Ma
Beaufort Island	740	2,427	76°56′S 166°56′E	Unknown
Mount Berlin	3,478	11,408	76°03′S 135°52′W	8350 BCE ± 5300 years
Mount Bird	1,765	5,791	77°16′S 166°44′E	4.6-3.8 Ma
Black Island	1,041	3,414	78°12′S 166°25′E	1.69 Ma
Bridgeman Island	240	787	62°04′S 56°44′W	Unknown
Brown Bluff	745	2,444	63°32′S 56°55′W	
Brown Peak	1,167	3,828	67°25′S 164°35′E	Unknown
Mount Bursey	2,787	9,141	76°01′S 132°38′W	0.49 Ma
Coulman Island	1,998	6,553	73°28′S 169°45′E	-
Daniell Peninsula	2,026	6,647	72°50′S 169°35′E	-
Deception Island	602	1,975	62°57′S 60°38′W	1970
Mount Discovery	2,578	8,456	78°22′S 165°01′E	1.87 Ma
Mount Erebus	3,794	12,444	77°31′S 167°09′E	2018
Mount Frakes	3,654	11,985	76°48′S 117°42′W	1.7 Ma
Franklin Island	247	810	76°05′S 168°19′E	Pleistocene
Gaussberg	370	1,214	66°48′S 89°11′E	Pleistocene
Mount Haddington	1,630	5,346	64°13′S 57°38′W	Unknown
Hallett Peninsula	1,770	5,810	72°30′S 170°10′E	
Mount Hampton	3,325	10,909	76°29′S 125°48′W	-
Hudson Mountains	749	2,457	74°25′S 99°30′W	210 BCE ± 200 years
Lars Christensen Peak	1,640	5,379	68°46′S 90°31′W	Unknown
Mount Melbourne	2,732	8,961	74°21′S 164°42′E	1892 ± 30 years
Melville Peak	549	1,801	62°01′S 57°41′W	Unknown
Mount Morning	2,723	8,931	78°31′S 163°35′E	Unknown
Mount Moulton	3,070	10,072	76°03′S 135°08′W	-
Mount Murphy	2,703	8,866	75°20′S 110°44′W	0.9 Ma
Mount Overlord	3,395	11,138	73°10′S 164°36′E	-
Paulet Island	353	1,158	63°35′S 55°47′W	Unknown
Penguin Island	180	590	62°06′S 57°54′W	1905 (?)
The Pleiades	3,040	9,971	72°42′S 165°32′E	1050 BC ± 1000 years
Red Island	495	1,624	63°44′S 57°52′W	
Mount Rittmann	2,600	8,530	73.45°S 165.5°E	1252 ± 2 years
Rosamel Island	2,600	8,530	78°10′S 162°40′E	
Royal Society Range	3,000	9,840	78°10′S 162°40′E	Unknown
Seal Nunataks	368	1,207	65°03′S 60°18′W	Unknown
Mount Sidley	4,285	14,058	77°02′S 126°06′W	-
Mount Siple	3,110	10,201	73°15′S 126°06′W	Unknown
Mount Steere	3,500	11,482	76°44′S 117°49′W	-
Mount Takahe	3,460	11,349	76°17′S 112°05′W	5550 BCE (?)
Mount Terra Nova	2,130	6,988	77°31′S 167°57′W	0.8 Ma
Mount Terror	3,262	10,699	77°31′S 168°32′E	0.82 Ma
Toney Mountain	3,595	11,792	75°48′S 115°48′W	Unknown
Mount Vernon Harcourt	1,570	5,151	72°32′S 169°55′E	-
Mount Waesche	3,292	10,801	77°10′S 126°54′W	Unknown

== See also ==
- Geology of Antarctica
- Lists of volcanoes

== Bibliography ==
- LeMasurier, W. E.; Thomson, J. W., eds. (1990). Volcanoes of the Antarctic Plate and Southern Oceans. American Geophysical Union. ISBN 0-87590-172-7.
- Volcano World Web site
- Siebert L, Simkin T (2002–present). Volcanoes of the World: an Illustrated Catalog of Holocene Volcanoes and their Eruptions. Smithsonian Institution, Global Volcanism Program Digital Information Series, GVP-3 (http://www.volcano.si.edu).
