= Mount Noice =

Mountain in Ross Dependency, Antarctica

Mount Noice (73°17′S 164°40′E) is a mountain (2,780 m) surmounting the southwest edge of Deception Plateau, 8 nautical miles (15 km) south of Mount Overlord, in Victoria Land. Mapped by United States Geological Survey (USGS) from surveys and U.S. Navy air photos, 1960–64. Named by Advisory Committee on Antarctic Names (US-ACAN) for Lieutenant Gary E. Noice, U.S. Navy, navigator with Squadron VX-6 at McMurdo Station, 1966.

The mountain is part of the Melbourne Volcanic Province of the McMurdo Volcanic Group. K–Ar or Rb–Sr dating has given an age of 6.38 ± 0.08 million years for Mount Noice obsidian and pantellerite.
