= Argo Point (scoria cone) =

- Location within Antarctica

Highest point
- Elevation: 360 m (1,180 ft)
- Coordinates: 66.25°S 60.92°W

Geography
- Location: Jason Peninsula, Antarctica
- Parent range: Seal Nunataks

Geology
- Mountain type: Volcanic vent

Argo Point is a scoria cone in Jason Peninsula, Antarctica, at a height of 360 metres (1,180 ft) above sea level. Associated with the Seal Nunataks, the cone has a diameter of 300 metres (980 ft) and its snow-filled crater has a gap on its northern side. The cone is constructed on a formation of lava and scoria over 175 metres (574 ft) thick, which may lie on Jurassic rocks. Glaciers or wind have eroded debris from the cone, forming a "tail" several kilometres long on the ice.

Potassium-argon dating has indicated ages of 1.4-0.9 mya, and the volcano formed in the absence of ice. The cone is constructed from basalt and hawaiite including lava bombs in its sides. Argo Point is related to Seal Nunataks and James Ross Island, and like these its rocks are ocean island basalts. This volcanism may be the consequence of back-arc effects of subduction along the South Shetland trench.

== See also ==
- List of volcanoes in Antarctica
