= Alfred Rittmann =

- Born: 23 March 1893; Basel, Switzerland
- Died: 19 September 1980 (aged 87); Piazza Armerina, Sicily
- Education: University of Geneva (1922)
- Known for: Die geologisch bedingte Evolution und Differentiation des Somma-Vesuvmagmas (1933), Orogénèse et volcanisme (1951), Volcanoes and their Activity (1962)
- Scientific career
- Workplaces: Volcanology Institute, Napoli (1926-34); University of Basel (1934-41); Centro geominerario, Instituto della Recostruzione Industriale, Napoli (1941-44); Centro Geologico Silano, Conzilio Nazionale delle Ricerche, Napoli (1944-48); University of Alexandria (1949-53); University of Cairo (1953-57); Volcanology Institute, University of Catania (1958-63); Istituto Internazionale di Vulcanologia, Catania (1960-68)
- Doctoral advisor: Louis Claude Duparc

Alfred Rittmann (23 March 1893 – 19 September 1980) was a leading volcanologist. He was elected President of the International Association of Volcanology for three terms (1954–1963).

== Life ==
Rittmann was the son of a dentist in Basel, Switzerland. He studied music and natural science at the University of Basel and later he changed to the University of Geneva. He received his PhD there (1922) for work on ultramafic rocks of the Ural Mountains.

Rittmann left Geneva to study with Alfred Lacroix in Paris, Friedrich Johann Karl Becke in Vienna, Ernst Anton Wülfing and Victor Mordechai Goldschmidt in Heidelberg. In 1926, the rich banker Immanuel Friedländer founded the Institute for Volcanology in Naples and Rittmann became the leading scientist of the institute. His work focused on Mount Vesuvius and on the island of Ischia. This resulted in his first great work: "Evolution und Differentiation des Somma-Vesuvmagmas" (Rittmann, 1933).

He drew the right conclusion that orogenic uplift volcanism (igneous rocks of the calc series), lacks alkaline basalts (igneous rocks of the sodic series). At the annual meeting of the German Geological Society in January 1939, he was right opposing the idea that the Mid-Atlantic Ridge was an orogenic uplift by compression, and his opposition to disregarding the Continental drift theory raised doubts. The work "Über den Zustand des Erdinnern und seine Entstehung aus einem homogenen Urzustand" (Kuhn and Rittmann, 1941) defended the non existence of an iron-nickel Earth core. His work "Orogénèse et volcanisme" (Rittmann, 1951) with collaboration of W. Kuhn demonstrated that crystalline mantle is able to creep under its pressure and temperature. His book "Vulkane und ihre Tätigkeit" was translated in five languages (2 ed.) and it was a standard work on volcanism.

He received the Gustav-Steinmann-Medaille (1965) and the doctor honoris causa from the University of Bern (1959). The Antarctic volcano Mount Rittmann and the mineral rittmannite (IMA 1987–048, 08.DH.15) were named in his honour.

His daughter Loredana Rittmann is also a volcanologist.

== Quote ==
Translation

...Mainly for morphological reasons, the view was expressed that the Mid-Atlantic Ridge was an embryonic folding of mountains. For similar reasons, it was suspected the existence of drowned mountains transverse to the Ridge that connect North Africa to Central America. These two assumptions seem to be contrary to all petrologists known fact (not theory!) that in the active orogenic uplift, magmas of the calc-alkali series ('Pacific igneous rocks') occur. In the Azores and the islands, of the Mid-Atlantic Ridge, however, come to light typical lavas of sodic-alkali series ('Atlantic igneous rocks' sic!), which speaks for a more cratonic character of that crusts. It would be highly unlikely that just an invisible piece of folded mountains is an exception, as all the mountain heights, with volcanoes, and especially the submarine mountains (Kuril Islands, Ryukyu Islands, Aleutian Islands, the Antilles, etc.) have normally magmas of very pronounced 'Pacific' character. Consideration of such petrological and magmalogical knowledge is a necessity. The same applies to the established findings of Geophysics and especially of the seismic, which are often neglected also...

— Alfred Rittmann

== Selected publications ==
- Rittmann, Alfred; Rittmann, Loredana (November 1982). Vulkane in Farbe. Suedwest Verlag. p. 128. ISBN 978-3517006246. Note: posthumous.
- Rittmann, Alfred; Gottini, V. (1981). "L'isola d'Ischia - Geologia". Bollettino del Servizio Geologico d'Italia. 101: 131–274. Note: posthumous.
- Rittmann, Alfred (1981). Vulkane und ihre Tätigkeit (3 ed.). Stuttgart: Ferdinand Enke Verlag. Note: posthumous.
- Rittmann, Alfred (1962). Volcanoes and their Activity. New York: John Wiley & Sons, Inc. p. 305, translated by EA Vincent from the 1960, 2 ed.
- Rittmann, Alfred (1958). "Zur Herkunft der Magmen". Geologische Rundschau. 48 (1): 1–10. Bibcode:1959GeoRu..48....1R. doi:10.1007/BF01801804.
- Rittmann, Alfred (December 1953). "Magmatic character and tectonic position of the Indonesia Volcanoes". Bulletin of Volcanology. 14 (1): 45–58. Bibcode:1953BVol...14...45R. doi:10.1007/BF02596004.
- Rittmann, Alfred (December 1952). "Nomenclature of volcanic rocks". Bulletin of Volcanology. 12 (1): 75–102. Bibcode:1952BVol...12...75R. doi:10.1007/BF02596015.
