= Edmonson Point =

Headland of Antarctica

Coordinates: 74°20′S 165°8′E

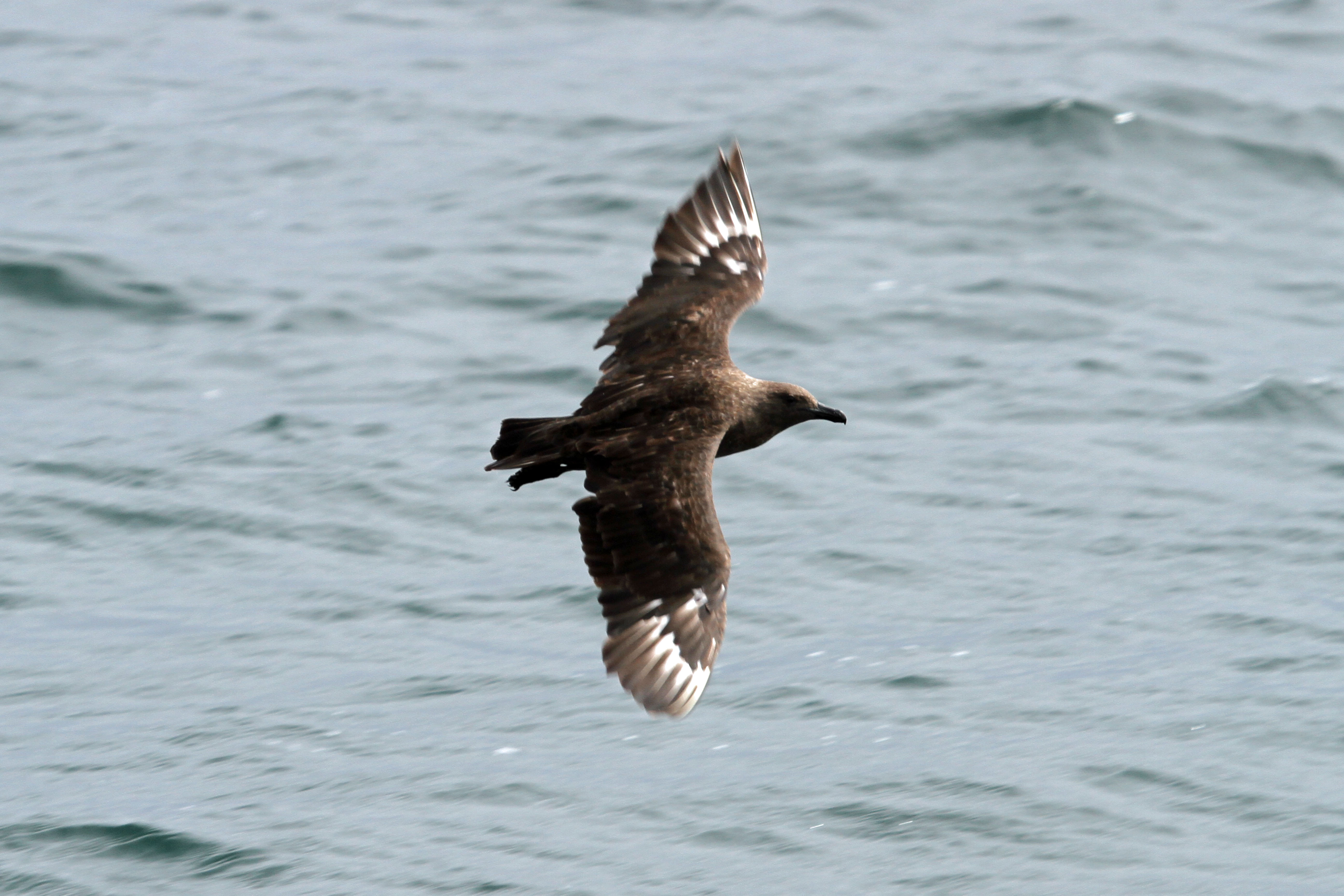
South polar skuas breed at the point

Edmonson Point is a rounded, largely ice-free point lying below Mount Melbourne along the west side of Wood Bay, Victoria Land, Antarctica. It was mapped by the United States Geological Survey from surveys and from US Navy air photographs, 1955–63, and was named by the Advisory Committee on Antarctic Names for Larry Edmonson, a satellite geodesy scientist at McMurdo Station, winter party 1966.

== Antarctic Specially Protected Area ==
The point has been designated an Antarctic Specially Protected Area (ASPA 165) because of its terrestrial and freshwater ecosystems. The volcanic lithology and substrates are nutrient-enriched by colonies of Adélie penguins and south polar skuas. The site contains a diverse range of freshwater habitats supporting algae, cyanobacteria and bryophytes. Terrestrial vegetation includes epilithic lichen and moss communities. Invertebrates are abundant. Weddell seals breed on the adjacent sea ice.

== Important Bird Area ==
A 550 ha site at the point has been designated an Important Bird Area (IBA) by BirdLife International because it supports a substantial breeding colony of south polar skuas.
