= Melville Peak =

Mountain in King George Island, South Shetland Islands, Antarctica

- Location within Antarctica

Highest point
- Elevation: 549 m (1,801 ft)
- Coordinates: 62°1′S 57°41′W

Geography
- Location: King George Island, Antarctica

Geology
- Rock age: Unknown
- Mountain type: Stratovolcano
- Last eruption: Unknown

Melville Peak is a prominent peak surmounting Cape Melville, the eastern cape of King George Island, in the South Shetland Islands off Antarctica. It represents an eroded stratovolcano of unknown age and contains a volcanic crater at its summit. A volcanic ash layer similar in composition to Melville Peak has been identified 30 km (19 mi) away from the volcano and may indicate Melville Peak has been volcanically active in the last few thousand years.

This peak, which was probably known to early sealers in the area, was charted by the French Antarctic Expedition under Jean-Baptiste Charcot, 1908–10, and takes its name from Cape Melville. It was climbed from the northeast in September 1949 by Geoff Hattersley-Smith and Ken Pawson.

== Geography and geomorphology ==
Melville Peak lies at the eastern end of King George Island, in the South Shetland Islands of Antarctica. The mountain rises from the peninsula that leads to Cape Melville.

The volcano is about 3 kilometres (1.9 mi) wide, but almost entirely covered by the ice of the Arctowski Icefield and Danowski Glacier. Rock formations consisting of lava flows and pyroclastics crop out at and close to Sherratt Bay to the south; two outcrops form the vents of the volcano. The older vent forms the highest point of Melville Peak with 549 metres (1,801 ft) elevation. Lava Crag crops out east of Melville Peak at Destruction Bay on the northeastern side of King George Island, while the Rolnicki Buttresses are located west-southwest of the main Melville Peak.

The volcano has been eroded by glaciers and by the sea, exposing its internal structure in particular at Sherratt Bay and the eastern ridge.

== Geology ==
Until four million years ago, subduction was taking place west of the South Shetland Islands, forming a volcanic arc. During the late Cenozoic, the formation of the Bransfield Rift split the South Shetland Islands off the Antarctic Peninsula and severed the arc in two parts. Present-day and recent volcanism in the region is linked to the spreading of the Bransfield Rift.

The basement under Melville Peak is formed by the Moby Dick Group, which probably formed during the late Cretaceous. The Moby Dick Group was later intruded by andesitic and basaltic dykes, tilted southwestward and faulted. The sedimentary Cape Melville Formation and the volcanic Destruction Bay Formation underlie Melville Peak and were emplaced during the Miocene. The crust has a continental character.

Melville Peak forms an alignment with Low Head and Penguin Island, volcanoes that have produced olivine basalts during the Cenozoic, sometimes named Penguin Line. This alignment may be a consequence of Bransfield Strait rifting and normal faults linked to the rift, although Melville Peak is off the main rift axis.

=== Composition ===
The volcano has produced basaltic andesite and basaltic rocks containing augite, olivine and clinopyroxene; the rocks define an alkaline to calc-alkaline suite rich in aluminum. They are aphanitic or vesicular in the older volcano stage. The composition implies that the magma originated from the deep mantle and ascended quickly through the crust, with no storage in a magma chamber.

== Eruption history ==
Melville Peak grew in two stages. The first stage crops out close to the sea and consists of alternating lava-pyroclastic layers; it is called the Hektor Icefall Formation. Gaseous explosions produced fragments and agglomerates, and there are breccia, tuffs and rocks derived from the sedimentary basement. Yellow tuffs may have been formed by hydrovolcanic activity. In other places there are columnar lava flows and tuff formations. Potassium-argon dating has yielded ages of 296,000 ± 27,000 and 72,000 ± 15,000 years ago for the first stage, partly contemporary to submarine volcanism in the Bransfield Strait. The second stage followed after a time of glacial erosion and is called Deacon Peak Formation, resembling the formation of the same name on Penguin Island. It consists of lavas and agglomerates embedded within red and brown lavas. The vents of this stage are located northeast of these of the Hektor Icefall Formation.

The volcano was active in the Quaternary and its last eruptions may have occurred during the middle Holocene. A volcanic ash layer found in a marine core about 30 kilometres (19 mi) southeast from Melville Peak may imply that the volcano was active a few thousand years ago. Another 5,500-5,000 years old tephra layer found in lakes on King George Island may originate at Melville Peak or more likely at Penguin Island.

== See also ==
- List of volcanoes in Antarctica
