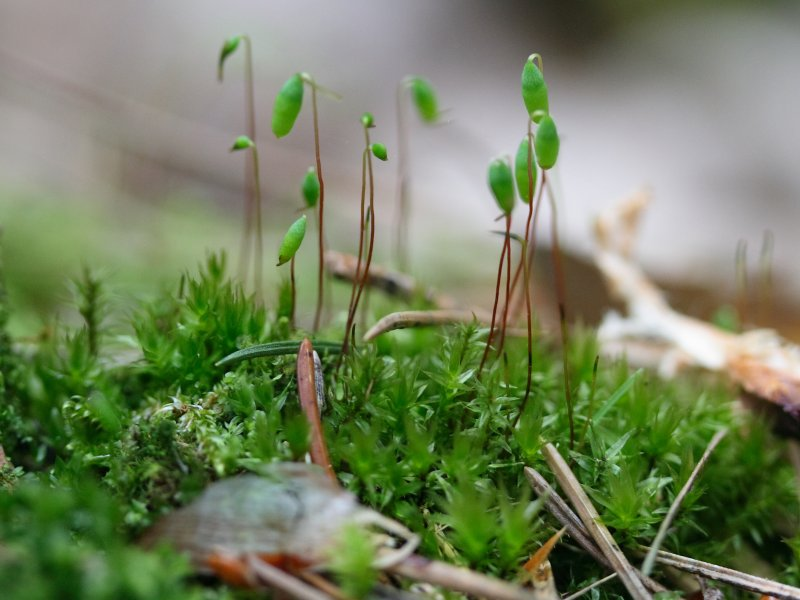

Scientific classification
- Kingdom: Plantae
- Division: Bryophyta
- Class: Bryopsida
- Subclass: Bryidae
- Order: Bryales
- Family: Mniaceae
- Genus: Pohlia
- Species: P. nutans

Binomial name
- Pohlia nutans (Hedw.) Lindb.

Infraspecific taxa
- Pohlia nutans subsp. nutans; Pohlia nutans subsp. schimperi (Müll. Hal.) Nyholm; Pohlia nutans var. clavata Broth. ex Ihsiba; Pohlia nutans var. nutans

Synonyms
- Species: Bryum afronutans Müll. Hal.; Bryum austronutans Müll. Hal.; Bryum basalticum Warnst. & Geh.; Bryum bealeyense R. Br. bis; Bryum beccarii Müll. Hal.; Bryum bicolor (Hornsch.) Brid.; Bryum bimum var. implexum (Sw.) Hartm.; Bryum caespitosum (Hornsch.) Brid.; Bryum caespitosum var. sphagnetorum (Schimp.) Boulay; Bryum caespitosum var. strangulatum (Nees) Rabenh.; Bryum canaliculatum (Müll. Hal. & Kindb.) Müll. Hal.; Bryum compactum Dicks.; Bryum cucullatiforme Kindb.; Bryum ecklonianum Müll. Hal.; Bryum gelidum I. Hagen; Bryum gypsophilum Wallr.; Bryum humidulum Sull. & Lesq.; Bryum implexum Sw.; Bryum interruptum Dicks.; Bryum laxum Reichardt; Bryum leptopelmatum Müll. Hal.; Bryum longifolium Müll. Hal. & Hampe; Bryum longisetum Brid.; Bryum montanum Müll. Hal.; Bryum nigricans Dicks.; Bryum nutans (Hedw.) Turner; Bryum nutans subsp. canaliculatum (Müll. Hal. & Kindb.) Kindb.; Bryum nutans subsp. cuspidatulum Kindb.; Bryum nutans subsp. macounii Kindb.; Bryum nutans var. alpicola Wahlenb.; Bryum nutans var. bicolor (Hornsch.) Bruch & Schimp.; Bryum nutans var. caespitosum (Hornsch.) Bruch & Schimp.; Bryum nutans var. gracilescens Boulay; Bryum nutans var. longisetum (Brid.) Bruch & Schimp.; Bryum nutans var. minus Brid.; Bryum nutans var. robustum Boulay; Bryum nutans var. rufescens Lindb.; Bryum nutans var. subdenticulatum (Brid.) Bruch & Schimp.; Bryum nutans var. vulgare Boulay; Bryum pendulum Brid.; Bryum pertenellum Bryhn & Ryan; Bryum pulvinatum Müll. Hal.; Bryum sericeum Huds. ex With.; Bryum sphagnadelphus Müll. Hal.; Bryum subdenticulatum Brid.; Bryum torlessense R. Br. bis; Bryum umbrosum Wallr.; Hypnum nutans (Hedw.) F. Weber & D. Mohr; Lamprophyllum nutans (Hedw.) Lindb.; Mniobryum compactum (Dicks.) Baehni; Mnium compactum (Dicks.) P. Beauv.; Mnium nigricans (Dicks.) Brid.; Mnium nutans (Hedw.) Hoffm. ex Spreng.; Pohlia beccarii (Müll. Hal.) Watts & Whitel.; Pohlia betulina Warnst.; Pohlia caespitosa (Hornsch.) Laz.; Pohlia elatior (Dixon & Sainsbury) Sainsbury; Pohlia leptopelmata (Müll. Hal.) Watts & Whitel.; Pohlia longifolia (A. Jaeger) Watts & Whitel.; Pohlia montana (Müll. Hal.) Watts & Whitel.; Pohlia nutans f. angustiretis (H. Winter ex Broth.) Podp.; Pohlia nutans f. arenaria (Mikut.) Podp.; Pohlia nutans f. basaltica (Warnst. & Geh.) Podp.; Pohlia nutans f. brevicuspidata (Röll) Podp.; Pohlia nutans f. bryoides (Schiffn.) Podp.; Pohlia nutans f. compacta (Röll) Podp.; Pohlia nutans f. cuspidatulum (Kindb.) Podp.; Pohlia nutans f. decipiens R. Wilczek & Demaret; Pohlia nutans f. decurtata (Warnst.) Podp.; Pohlia nutans f. flagellata (Röll) Podp.; Pohlia nutans f. gemmiclada (Schiffn.) C.E.O. Jensen; Pohlia nutans f. inclinata (Podp.) Podp.; Pohlia nutans f. laxa (H. Winter ex Röll) Podp.; Pohlia nutans f. longicuspidata (Röll) Podp.; Pohlia nutans f. longiseta Latzel; Pohlia nutans f. microspora (Latzel) Podp.; Pohlia nutans f. mollis (Warnst.) Podp.; Pohlia nutans f. pallescens H. Winter; Pohlia nutans f. paludosa (Warnst.) Podp.; Pohlia nutans f. patula (Loeske) E. Bauer; Pohlia nutans f. pehrii (Latzel) Podp.; Pohlia nutans f. prolifera (Warnst.) Podp.; Pohlia nutans f. pseudocucullata (Limpr.) Podp.; Pohlia nutans f. purpurascens (Latzel) Podp.; Pohlia nutans f. ramosissima (Hamm.) Podp.; Pohlia nutans f. robusta (Boulay) Podp.; Pohlia nutans f. saltans (Loeske) Podp.; Pohlia nutans f. sphagnetorum (Schimp.) Kopsch; Pohlia nutans f. stollei (Riehm.) Podp.; Pohlia nutans f. strangulata (Nees) Kopsch; Pohlia nutans f. teres (C.E.O. Jensen) Podp.; Pohlia nutans f. turbinata (Bom.) Podp.; Pohlia nutans var. angustiretis H. Winter ex Broth.; Pohlia nutans var. anomala Warnst.; Pohlia nutans var. bicolor (Hornsch.) Hult; Pohlia nutans var. bryoides Schiffn.; Pohlia nutans var. bulbifera J.J. Amann; Pohlia nutans var. caespitosa (Hornsch.) Podp.; Pohlia nutans var. camptocarpa Meyl.; Pohlia nutans var. decurtata Warnst.; Pohlia nutans var. gypsophila (Wallr.) Wijk & Margad.; Pohlia nutans var. inclinata Podp.; Pohlia nutans var. longicolla Warnst.; Pohlia nutans var. longiseta (Brid.) Delogne; Pohlia nutans var. microcarpa Warnst.; Pohlia nutans var. mollis Warnst.; Pohlia nutans var. paludosa Warnst.; Pohlia nutans var. patula Loeske; Pohlia nutans var. pehrii Latzel; Pohlia nutans var. prolifera (Warnst.) Warnst.; Pohlia nutans var. pseudocucullata (Limpr.) H.A. Möller; Pohlia nutans var. ramosissima Hamm.; Pohlia nutans var. sphagnetorum (Schimp.) Delogne; Pohlia nutans var. strangulata (Nees) Delogne; Pohlia nutans var. subdenticulata (Brid.) Delogne; Pohlia nutans var. subglobosa R. Ruthe; Pohlia nutans var. teres C.E.O. Jensen; Pohlia nutans var. triciliata (Jenn.) Jenn.; Pohlia nutans var. turbinata (Bom.) H.A. Möller; Pohlia nutans var. uliginosa (Schimp.) Herzog; Pohlia nutans var. vulgaris (Boulay) Podp.; Pohlia polygama Kindb.; Pohlia pulvinata (Kindb.) Broth.; Pohlia racovitzae (Cardot) Broth.; Pohlia suzukii Ochi; Pohlia tomentoso-caespitosa Ochi; Pohlia yanoi Ochi; Pseudopohlia merrillii Broth.; Webera afronutans (Müll. Hal.) Paris; Webera albicans var. deflexa Kindb.; Webera albicans var. macrospora Kindb.; Webera austro-nutans (Müll. Hal.) Kindb.; Webera beccarii (Müll. Hal.) Paris; Webera bicolor Hornsch.; Webera caespitosa Hornsch.; Webera canaliculata Müll. Hal. & Kindb.; Webera canaliculata var. microcarpa Kindb.; Webera cucullatiformis (Kindb.) Paris; Webera duriuscula Broth.; Webera eckloniana (Müll. Hal.) A. Jaeger; Webera ecklonii Müll. Hal.; Webera elatior Dixon & Sainsbury; Webera leptoclada Cardot & Broth.; Webera longifolia A. Jaeger; Webera longiseta Brid.; Webera montana (Müll. Hal.) Paris; Webera nigricans (Dicks.) Buse; Webera nutans Hedw.; Webera nutans f. brevicuspidatum Röll; Webera nutans f. compacta Röll; Webera nutans f. flagellata Röll; Webera nutans f. gemmiclada (Schiffn.) C.E.O. Jensen; Webera nutans f. laxa H. Winter ex Röll; Webera nutans f. longicuspidata Röll; Webera nutans f. microspora Latzel; Webera nutans f. saltans Loeske; Webera nutans subsp. cuspidatula (Kindb.) Paris; Webera nutans subsp. macounii (Kindb.) Paris; Webera nutans var. alpina Podp. ex Herzog; Webera nutans var. angustirete (H. Winter ex Broth.) C.E.O. Jensen; Webera nutans var. arenaria Mikut.; Webera nutans var. bicolor (Hornsch.) Fürnr.; Webera nutans var. caespitosa (Hornsch.) Fürnr.; Webera nutans var. elongata Cypers; Webera nutans var. flagellifera Buyss.; Webera nutans var. gemmiclada Schiffn.; Webera nutans var. gypsophila (Wallr.) Huebener; Webera nutans var. hokinensis Besch.; Webera nutans var. longiseta (Brid.) Huebener; Webera nutans var. macounii (Kindb.) Macoun; Webera nutans var. macrospora (Kindb.) Kindb.; Webera nutans var. minor (Brid.) Brid.; Webera nutans var. prolifera Warnst.; Webera nutans var. pseudocucullata Limpr.; Webera nutans var. ramosissima (Hamm.) Fam.; Webera nutans var. rufescens (Lindb.) Berggr.; Webera nutans var. sphagnetorum Schimp.; Webera nutans var. stollei Riehm.; Webera nutans var. strangulata (Nees) Schimp.; Webera nutans var. subdenticulata (Brid.) Huebener; Webera nutans var. teres (C.E.O. Jensen) Paris; Webera nutans var. triciliata Jenn.; Webera nutans var. turbinata Bom.; Webera nutans var. uliginosa Schimp.; Webera pendula Hornsch.; Webera polygama (Kindb.) Broth.; Webera pulvinata Kindb.; Webera racovitzae Cardot; Webera sphagnadelphus (Müll. Hal.) Besch.; Webera strangulata Nees; Webera subdenticulata (Brid.) Brid.; subsp. schimperi: Bryum nutans subsp. schimperi (Müll. Hal.) Kindb.; Bryum rutilans Bruch & Schimp.; Bryum schimperi Müll. Hal.; Pohlia nutans subsp. rutilans Lindb.; Pohlia nutans var. purpurascens Latzel; Pohlia nutans var. rutilans (Lindb.) C.E.O. Jensen; Pohlia rutilans Broth.; Pohlia schimperi (Müll. Hal.) A.L. Andrews; Webera nutans subsp. schimperi (Müll. Hal.) J.J. Amann; Webera nutans var. rutilans (Lindb.) C.E.O. Jensen; Webera rutilans Schimp.; Webera schimperi (Müll. Hal.) Schimp.; Webera schimperi var. filicaulis G. Roth

= Pohlia nutans =

Species of plant in the family Mniaceae

Pohlia nutans, the nodding thread-moss, is a species of moss in the family Mniaceae. It has a cosmopolitan distribution, found on all seven continents; Europe, Iceland, Siberia, Japan, North America, Greenland, the Andes of South America, South Africa, Tasmania and nearby mainland Australia, New Zealand, and the Antarctic Peninsula and Mount Rittmann in Antarctica. An extremophile, it is resistant to cold, drought, salt, acid, heavy metals, and intense UV radiation.

Pohlia nutans is subject to fungal infections which cause fairy rings to appear. Some causative agents have been identified, including species of Cladosporium, Mortierella gamsii and Mortierella fimbricystis.

== Subtaxa ==
The following subtaxa are accepted:

- Pohlia nutans subsp. nutans
- Pohlia nutans subsp. schimperi (Müll. Hal.) Nyholm
- Pohlia nutans var. clavata Broth. ex Ihsiba
- Pohlia nutans var. nutans
