= Hargreaves Peak =

Highest peak on Adare Peninsula, Victoria Land, Antarctica

Coordinates: 71°37′15″S 170°33′05″E

- Location within Antarctica

Highest point
- Elevation: 2,085 m (6,841 ft)
- Prominence: 1,378 m (4,521 ft)
- Listing: Ribu

Hargreaves Peak () is the highest peak on Adare Peninsula, Victoria Land, rising to 2,085 metres (6,841 ft). It stands sharply above Downshire Cliffs to the east; with gently descending ice slopes on the western side toward Nameless Glacier. Named by the New Zealand Geographic Board in 2008 after Paul Hargreaves, sea cadet aboard HMNZS Hawea on the first New Zealand scientific voyage into the Southern Ocean and Ross Sea in company with HMNZS Endeavour, summer 1956–57; visitor to Scott Base and McMurdo Sound on a Distinguished Visitor tour, in January 1994; board member, Antarctica New Zealand from 2001; chairman, 2003–2008.
