= Talos Dome =

Geographic feature in Oates Land, Antarctica

Talos Dome Camp
- Camp
- Location within Antarctica
- Coordinates: 72°49′40″S 159°11′00″E
- Country: Italy
- Location in Antarctica: Talos Dome; Usarp Mountains; Antarctica
- Administered by: National Antarctic Research Program
- Established: 2004
- Elevation: 2,315 m (7,595 ft)

Population
  - Total: 12
- Type: Seasonal
- Status: Removed 2008

Talos Dome (73°0′S 158°0′E; sometimes spelled Thalos Dome) is a large ice dome rising to 2,300 m (7,500 ft) to the southwest of the Usarp Mountains in Antarctica.

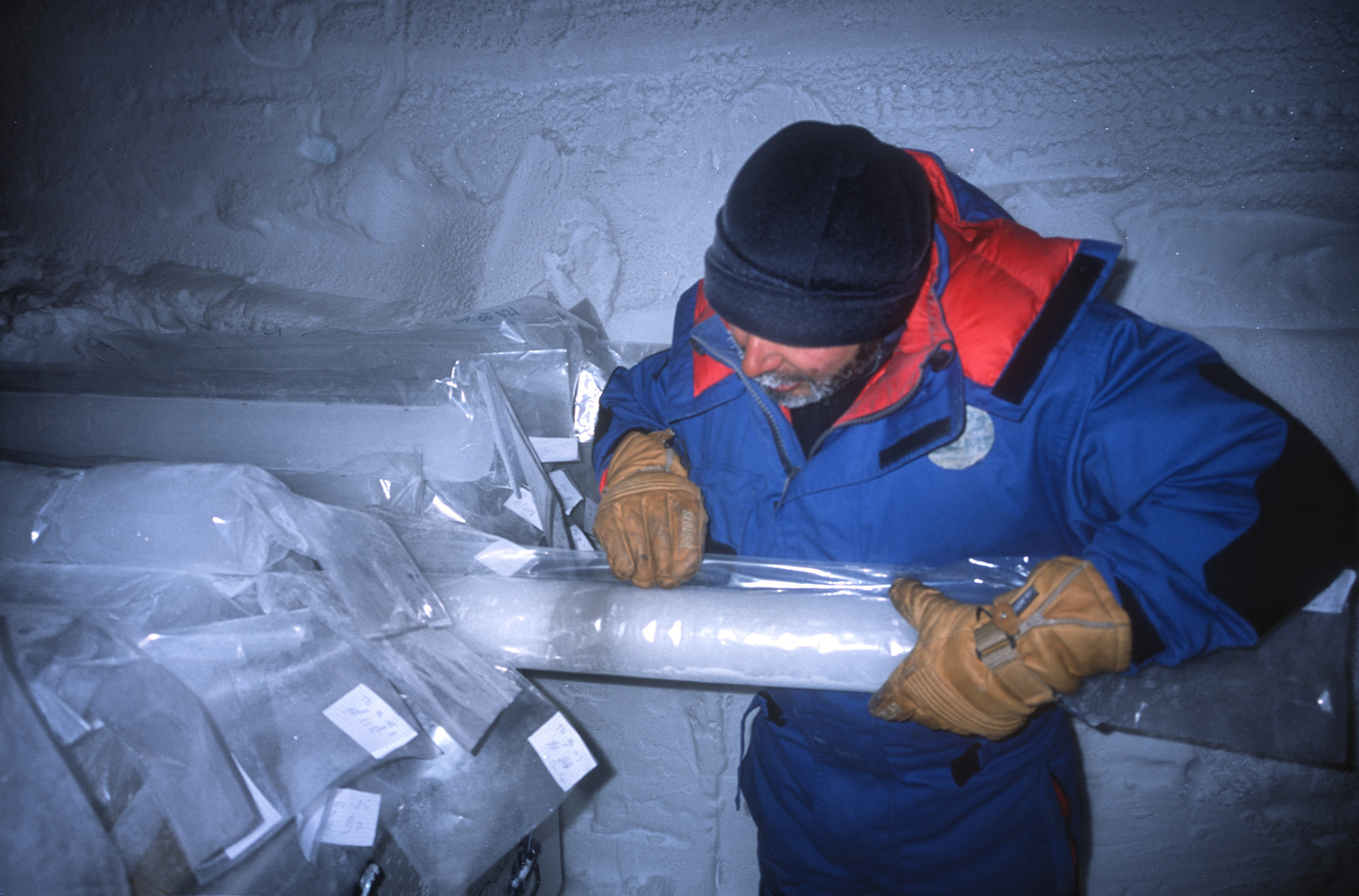
Ice core extracted at Talos Dome showing an ash layer corresponding to the Toba supervolcano eruption

The dome overlies the east margin of the Wilkes Subglacial Basin. The feature was delineated by the Scott Polar Research Institute-National Science Foundation-Technical University of Denmark airborne radio echo sounding program, 1967–1979.

The dome was named after Talos of Greek mythology, who assisted Minos in the defense of Crete.

== See also ==
- List of Antarctic field camps
