= Hallett Peninsula =

Peninsula in Antarctica

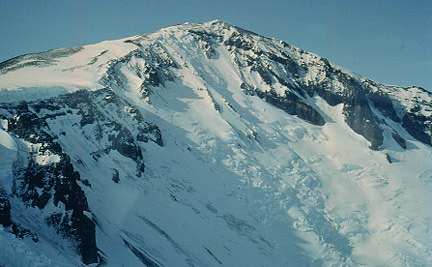
- Mount Vernon Harcourt

Highest point
- Coordinates: 72°30′S 170°10′E

Geography
- Location within Antarctica
- Location: Borchgrevink Coast, Victoria Land, Antarctica

The Hallett Peninsula (72°30′S 170°10′E) is a triangular, dome-shaped peninsula, 20 nautical miles (37 km; 23 mi) long, with 1,500 metres (4,900 ft) cliffs on its eastern seaboard side and 300 metres (980 ft) on its west side. The peninsula extends from Cape Hallett to Cape Wheatstone and is joined to the mainland by a narrow ridge between Tucker Glacier and Edisto Inlet. It was so named by the New Zealand Geological Survey Antarctic Expedition (NZGSAE), 1957–58, because Hallett Station on Seabee Hook was established at the north end of the peninsula.

== Geology ==
The peninsula is an elongated shield volcano complex similar to the Adare and Daniell peninsulas. It forms part of the Hallett Volcanic Province of the McMurdo Volcanic Group. Basaltic lava of the Hallett Peninsula has been dated to 6.4 ± 0.4 million years old.

== Geography ==
The Hallett Peminsula lies to the east of the Admiralty Mountains. The Football, Football Mountain and Football Saddle are on the neck of land connecting the peninsula to the mainland. To the east, Mount Vernon Harcourt overlooks the south coast, which extends to Cape Wheatstone. North of this cape, Quarterdeck Ridge defines the eastern spine of the peninsula, and the Cotter Cliffs are its east face. Heave-ho Slope lies between Mount Vernon Harcourt and Quarterdeck Ridge. Edisto Glacier runs past the southwest of the peninsula past Redcastle Ridge into Edisto Inlet. Arneb Glacier enter Edisto Inlet to the east of Redcastle Ridge. North of this are Roberts Cliff, Bridgman Glacier, Salmon Cliff, Bornmann Glacier, Seabee Hook and Cape Hallett, the northernmost point.

== Features ==
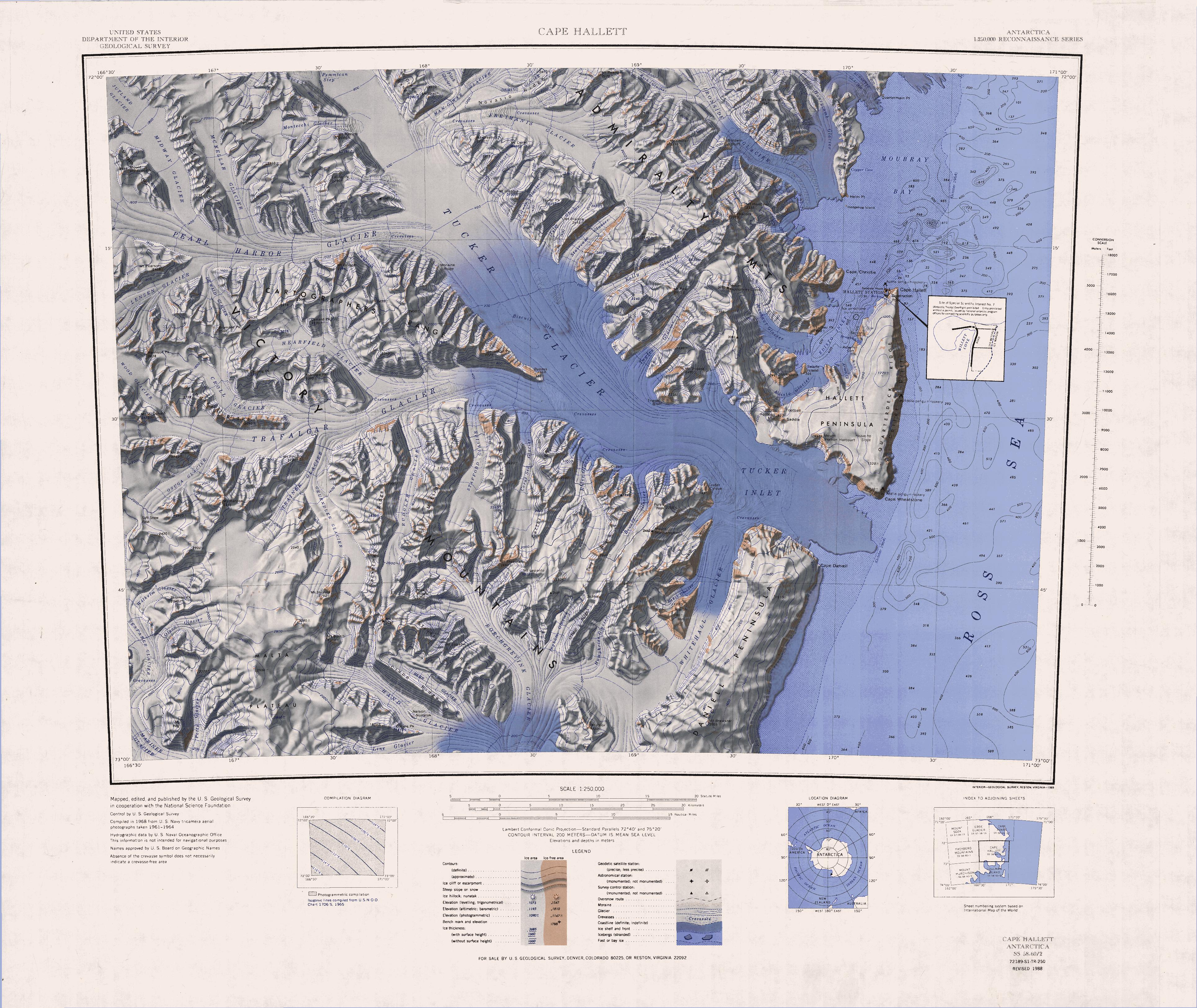
1:250,000 scale topographic map of Hallett Peninsula and Tucker Glacier

=== The Football ===
72°30′S 169°42′E. A prominent bare rock scar of football shape on the north side of Football Mountain, on the ridge separating Edisto Inlet and Tucker Glacier. The scar is surrounded by an unbroken snow slope and is said to be always visible, though occasionally lightly covered by snow for short periods, and is consequently a landmark for pilots and men at Hallett station. Given this descriptive name by the NZGSAE, 1957-58.

=== Football Mountain ===
72°31′S 169°42′E. Mountain, 830 metres (2,720 ft) high, with a prominent and peculiar rock scar called The Football on its north side, on the ridge between Edisto Inlet and Tucker Glacier. It was occupied as a survey station, and marked by a large rock caim, by the NZGSAE, 1957-58, who named it for The Football.

=== Football Saddle ===
72°31′S 169°46′E. Broad pass at 700 metres (2,300 ft) high, 2 nautical miles (3.7 km; 2.3 mi) east-southeast of Football Mountain on the ridge between Edisto Inlet and Tucker Glacier. The pass is an all-snow route that can be crossed by sledge, but there are two other saddles close east and west of Football Mountain that are no higher and are more easily crossed on foot, though more difficult by sledge because they are steeper and have stretches of bare rock. So named by the NZGSAE, 1957-58, because of its proximity to The Football.

=== Mount Vernon Harcourt ===
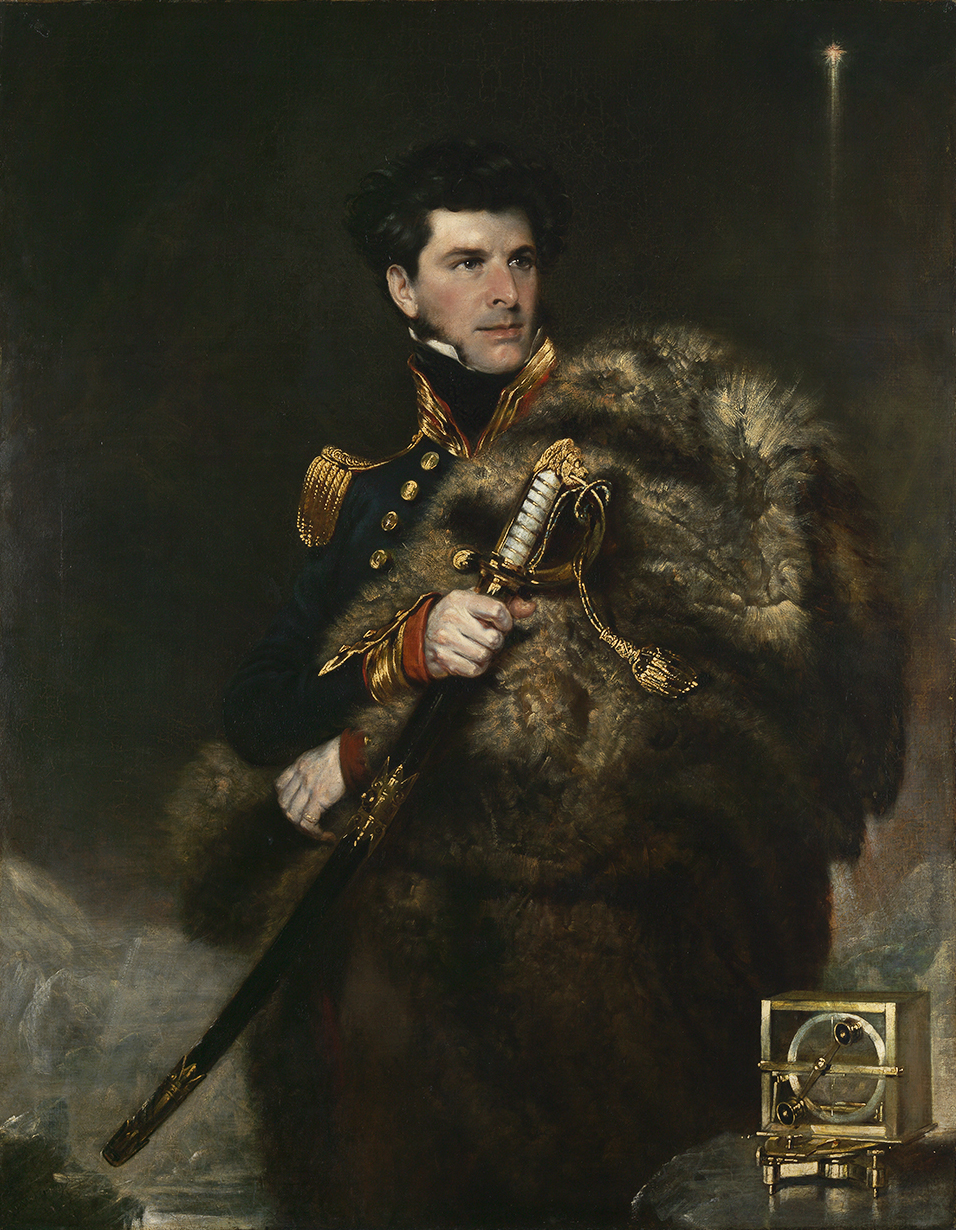
James Clark Ross

72°32′S 169°55′E. A remarkable conical mountain 1,570 metres (5,150 ft) high, in the south-central part of Hallett Peninsula. Discovered in January 1841 by Sir James Clark Ross and named by him for the Rev. William Vernon Harcourt, one of the founders of the British Association.

=== Cape Wheatstone ===
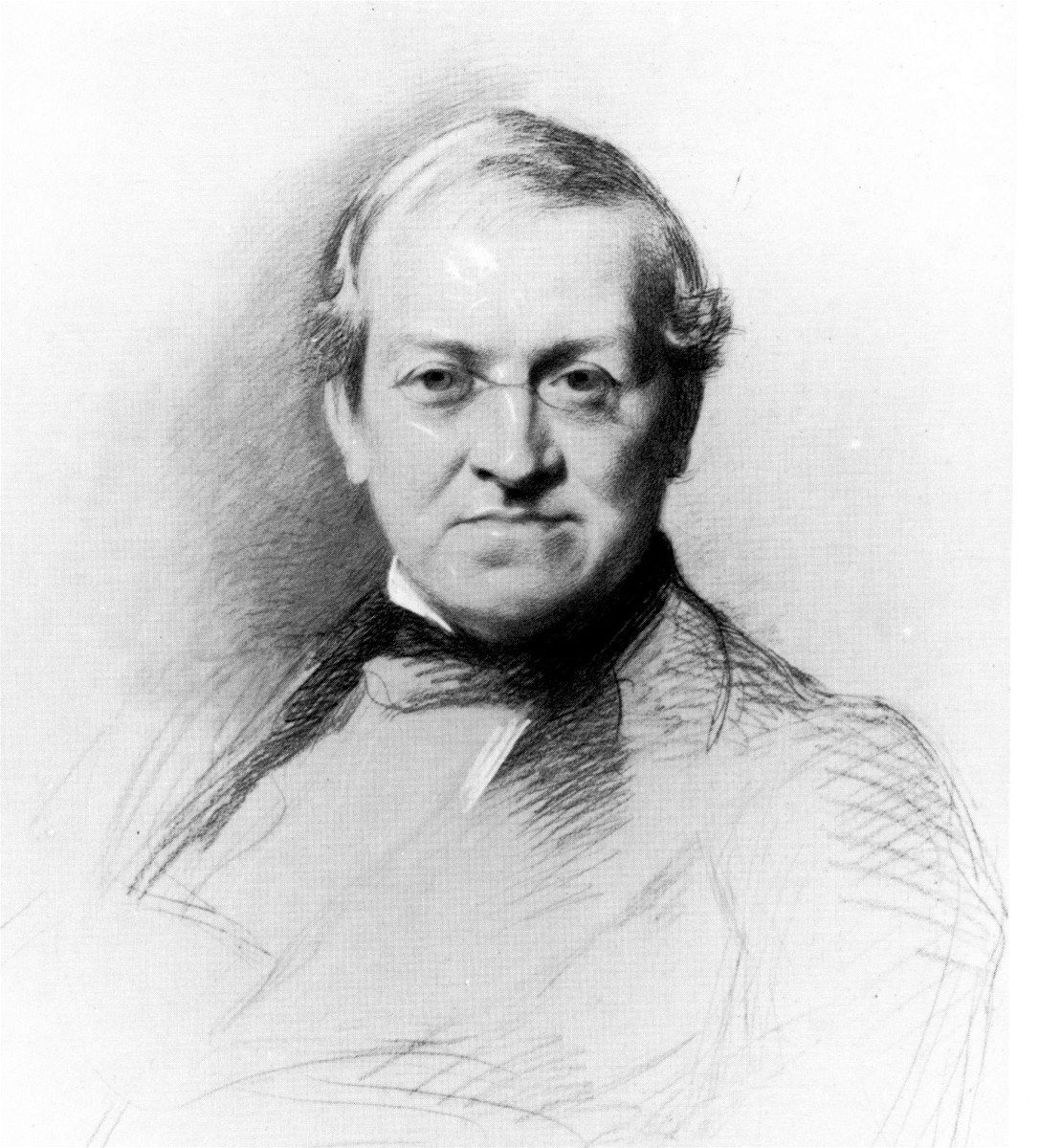
Charles Wheatstone

72°37′S 170°13′E. A bold rock cape that forms the south end of Hallett Peninsula and marks the north entrance to Tucker Inlet. Discovered in January 1841 by Sir James Clark Ross who named it for Sir Charles Wheatstone, English physicist and inventor.

=== Quarterdeck Ridge ===
72°27′S 170°16′E. The undulating, north-south snow crest of Hallett Peninsula. For the most part this crest is very close to the great 1,500 metres (4,900 ft) high Cotter Cliffs that fall abruptly to the Ross Sea. So named by NZGSAE, 1957-58, because impressions obtained in traversing along it recall those in walking the quarterdeck of a ship.

=== Cotter Cliffs ===
72°28′S 170°18′E. A line of spectacular bare rock cliffs rising 1,500 metres (4,900 ft) high above the Ross Sea and forming the seaward (east) face of Hallett Peninsula. A cape in this vicinity was named "Cape Cotter" in 1841 by Sir James Clark Ross, after Pownall R. Cotter, master on the Terror. No prominent cape exists along the east side of Hallett Peninsula, but the name Cotter has been retained for the cliffs in the same general area.

=== Heave-ho Slope ===
72°32′S 170°10′E. A slope falling 450 metres (1,480 ft) from Quarterdeck Ridge to a saddle at the southwestend of Hallett Peninsula. The slope must be traversed by parties moving overland from Hallett station to Tucker Glacier, after the bay ice in Edisto Inlet has broken out. The NZGSAE, 1957-58, met deep soft new snow in this area and sledges had to be man-hauled up the slope in relays, hence the name.

=== Redcastle Ridge ===
72°26′S 169°57′E. A castlelike ridge of red and black volcanic rocks between Arneb Glacier and the terminal face of Edisto Glacier at the head of Edisto Inlet. So named by the NZGSAE, 1957-58, because of its coloring and shape.

=== Arneb Glacier ===
72°25′S 170°02′E. Glacier 3 nautical miles (5.6 km; 3.5 mi) long and 2 nautical miles (3.7 km; 2.3 mi) wide, situated in a cliff-walled bay between Hallett Peninsula and Redcastle Ridge and flowing northwest into Edisto Inlet as a floating ice tongue. Named by the NZGSAE, 1957-58, for the USS Arneb, which in the 1957 season carried the buildings and stores for the establishment of Hallett station and revisited the station in subsequent seasons.

=== Roberts Cliff ===
72°24′S 170°05′E. The third prominent rock bluff south of Seabee Hook on the east shore of Edisto Inlet. Named by the NZGSAE, 1957-58, for Charles L. Roberts, Jr., USARP meteorologist and scientific leader at Hallett Station in 1959.

=== Bridgman Glacier ===
72°23′S 170°05′E. Steep glacier falling away from the west side of Hallett Peninsula and forming a floating ice tongue on the east shore of Edisto Inlet between Salmon and Roberts Cliffs. Named by the NZGSAE, 1957-58, for Lieutenant Albert H. Bridgman, MC, United States Navy, surgeon and United States Navy Operation Deep Freeze leader at Hallett station in 1959.

=== Salmon Cliff ===
72°22′S 170°06′E. The second prominent rock cliff south of Seabee Hook on the west side of Hallett Peninsula. Named by the NZGSAE, 1957-58, for K.J. Salmon, physicist and scientific leader at Hallett Station in 1958.

=== Bornmann Glacier ===
72°20′S 170°13′E. Glacier flowing from the west side of Hallett Peninsula 1 nautical mile (1.9 km; 1.2 mi) south of Seabee Hook and forming a short, floating ice tongue on the shore of Edisto Inlet. Named by the NZGSAE, 1957-58, for Lieutenant Robert C. Bornmann, MC, United States Navy, surgeon and leader of the United States Navy Operation Deep Freeze party at Hallett station in 1958.

=== Seabee Hook ===
72°19′S 170°13′E. Low, recurved spit composed of coarse volcanic ash which projects about 0.5 nautical miles (0.93 km; 0.58 mi) west from the high rocky ridge forming Cape Hallett. Surveyed in January 1956 by members of United States Navy Operation Deep Freeze I aboard the icebreaker USS Edisto. Named by the US-ACAN for the Seabee unit aboard the Edisto which investigated and surveyed this area for possible use as a base site for International Geophysical Year operations. Seabee is a phonetic spelling for "construction battalion" and now refers to individual or collective members of naval construction engineer units.

=== Construction Point ===
72°19′S 170°13′E. Point marking the west side of the entrance to Willett Cove and the south end of Seabee Hook, a low recurved spit 1.5 nautical miles (2.8 km; 1.7 mi) west-southwest of Cape Hallett. Surveyed in January 1956 by members of United States Navy Operation Deep Freeze I aboard the icebreaker USS Edisto. So named by the US-ACAN because of its close association with Seabee Hook.

=== Cape Hallett ===
72°19′S 170°16′E. A bold rock cape forming the north tip of Hallett Peninsula. Discovered in 1841 by Sir James Clark Ross who named it for Thomas R. Hallett, purser on one of the expedition ships, the Erebus.

== Sources ==
- Alberts, Fred G., ed. (1995), Geographic Names of the Antarctic (PDF) (2 ed.), United States Board on Geographic Names This article incorporates public domain material from websites or documents of the United States Board on Geographic Names.
- Cape Hallet, USGS: United States Geological Survey, 1968
- Riffenburgh, Beau (2007), Encyclopedia of the Antarctic, vol. 1, Taylor & Francis, p. 639, ISBN 978-0-415-97024-2

This article incorporates public domain material from websites or documents of the United States Geological Survey.
