= Mount Overlord =

Mountain in Ross Dependency, Antarctica

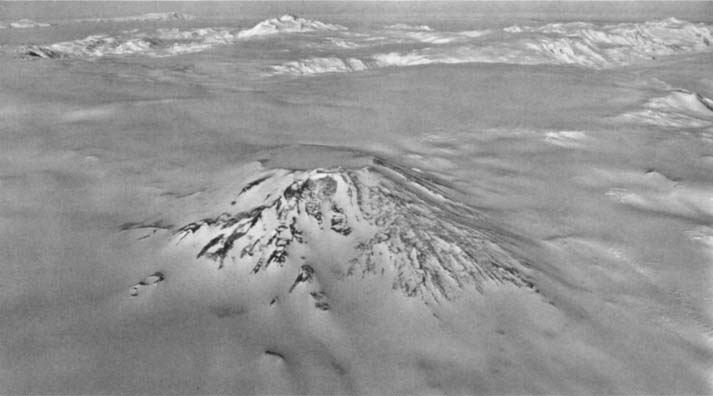
- Aerial view of Mount Overlord from the southwest

Highest point
- Elevation: 3,395 m (11,138 ft)
- Coordinates: 73°10′S 164°36′E

Geography
- Location within Antarctica
- Location: Victoria Land, Antarctica

Geology
- Rock age: 7,000,000 years
- Mountain type: Stratovolcano (extinct)
- Volcanic belt: McMurdo Volcanic Group
- Last eruption: Miocene

Mount Overlord is a very large mountain which is an extinct stratovolcano, situated at the northwest limit of Deception Plateau, 50 miles inland from the Ross Sea and just east of the head of Aviator Glacier in Victoria Land. Its asymmetrical cone is on the edge of a plateau above Aviator Glacier. While most of the cone is ice-covered, Mount Overlord does have a 1.2-mile (1.9-kilometer) diameter caldera. Volcanic rocks from the western slope have been dated to about seven million years, so the volcano is thought to be extinct.

It was so named by the northern party of New Zealand Geological Survey Antarctic Expedition (NZGSAE), 1962–63, because it "overlords" lesser peaks in the area.

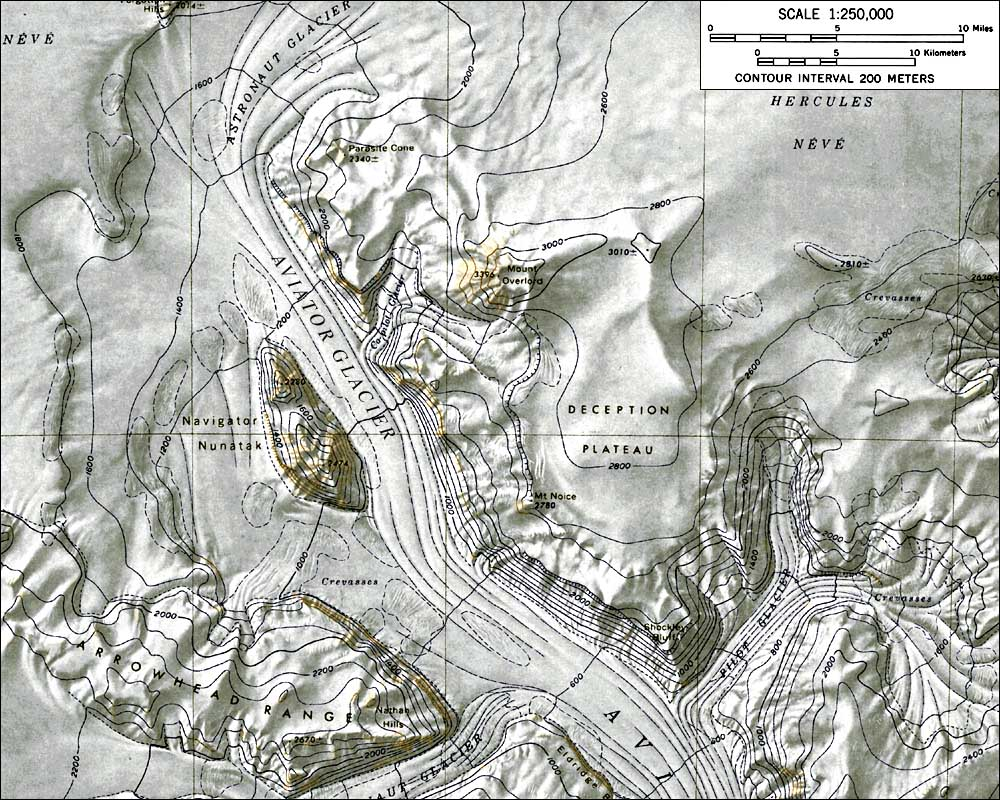
Topographic map of Mount Overlord (1:250,000 scale)

== See also ==
- List of volcanoes in Antarctica

== Sources ==
- LeMasurier, W. E.; Thomson, J. W., eds. (1990). Volcanoes of the Antarctic Plate and Southern Oceans. American Geophysical Union. ISBN 0-87590-172-7.
- "Skiing the Pacific Ring of Fire and Beyond". Amar Andalkar's Ski Mountaineering and Climbing Site. 2007 [1997].
