= Kennicutt Point =

Kennicutt Point (74°30′00″S 165°29′00″E) is the south entrance point of Wood Bay on the Borchgrevink Coast. The point is 9 nautical miles (17 km) north of Cape Washington. It was named by the Advisory Committee on Antarctic Names in 2005 after Mahlon Kennicutt II, Geochemical and Environmental Research Group, Texas A&M University; United States Antarctic Program investigator of marine-habitat change in McMurdo Sound, near the McMurdo Station, and in Arthur Harbor in proximity of the Palmer Station for several summer seasons between 1990 and 2005.
