= Borchgrevink =

Borchgrevink is a surname. Notable people with the surname include:

- Aage Borchgrevink, Norwegian writer
- Carsten Borchgrevink (1864–1934), Anglo-Norwegian explorer
- Leonhard Christian Borchgrevink Holmboe (1802–1887), Norwegian priest and politician

== See also ==
- Borchgrevink Glacier, a glacier in the polar regions
- Borchgrevink Nunatak, a nunatak
- Borchgrevink Coast, an area in the arctic
- Borchgrevink Canyon, an undersea canyon
- Mount Borchgrevink, an arctic mountain
