= Tinker Glacier =

Glacier in Victoria Land, Antarctica

- Location within Antarctica
- Location: Victoria Land
- Coordinates: 74°00′S 164°50′E
- Terminus: Wood Bay

The Tinker Glacier (74°00′S 164°50′E) is a 25 nautical miles (46 km; 29 mi) long glacier in Antarctica, draining the central part of the Southern Cross Mountains and flowing southeast into Wood Bay, on the coast of Victoria Land. Named by the Northern Party of the New Zealand Geological Survey Antarctic Expedition (NZGSAE), 1962–63, for Lieutenant Colonel Ron Tinker, leader at Scott Base during that season.

== Geography ==
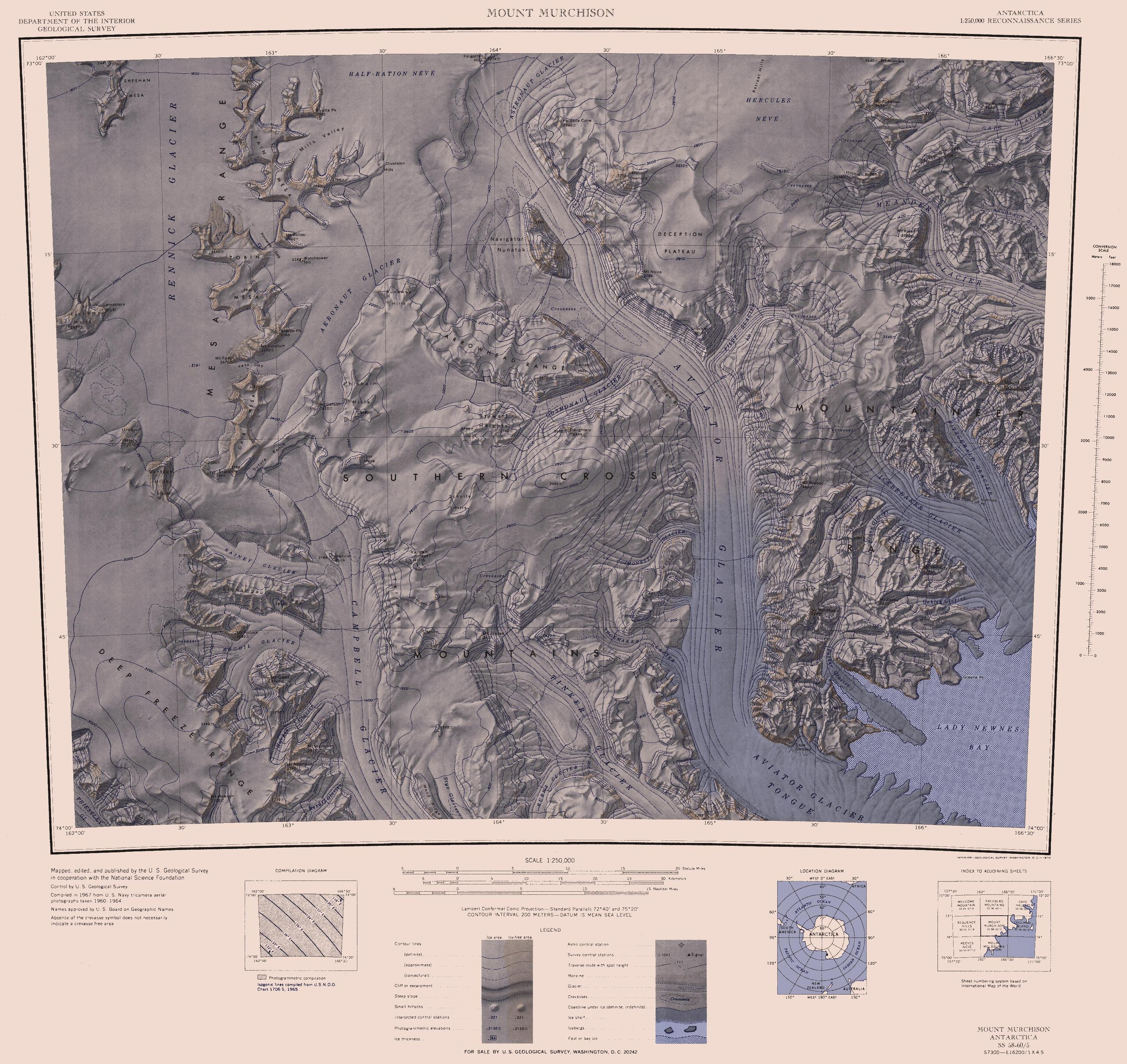
Tinker Glacier in south center of map

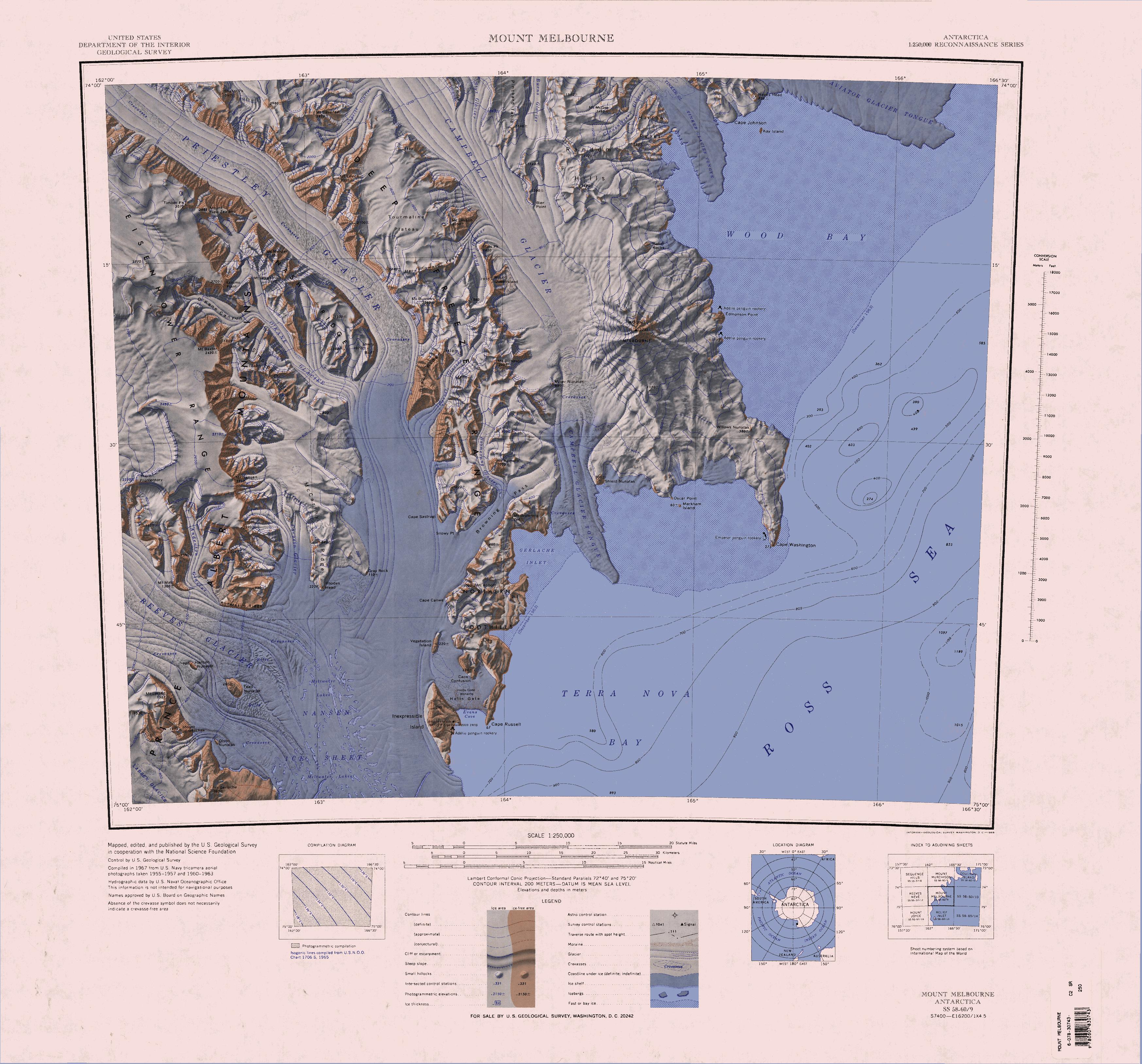
Tinker Glacier Tongue to northeast

Tinker Glacier forms in the Southern Cross Mountains to the south of the Schulte Hills, and flows south past Mount Jiracek to the west, running parallel to Aviator Glacier to the east. Burns Glacier joins from the west. The Clausnitzer Glacier joins from the west before the Harrow Peaks. Tinker glacier forms the Tinker Glacier Tongue when it flows past Cape Johnson into Wood Bay of the Ross Sea.

== Features ==
Named features, from north to south, include:

=== Burns Glacier ===
73°57′S 164°15′E. A tributary glacier, 12 nautical miles (22 km; 14 mi) long, flowing north along the east side of Pinckard Table to enter the southwest side of Tinker Glacier. Mapped by USGS from surveys and United States Navy air photos, 1955-63. Named by US-ACAN for John P. Burns, radioman with the McMurdo Station winter parties of 1963 and 1967.

=== Clausnitzer Glacier ===
74°02′S 164°41′E. A tributary glacier flowing east from Random Hills to enter Tinker Glacier just north of Harrow Peaks. Mapped by USGS from surveys and United States Navy air photos, 1955-63. Named by US-ACAN for Frazer W. Clausnitzer, ionospheric physics scientist at McMurdo Station, winter 1966.

=== Tinker Glacier Tongue ===
74°06′S 165°02′E. The seaward extension of the Tinker Glacier, projecting into the northwest corner of Wood Bay. The name was suggested by US-ACAN in association with Tinker Glacier.

== Sources ==
- Alberts, Fred G., ed. (1995), Geographic Names of the Antarctic (PDF) (2 ed.), United States Board on Geographic Names This article incorporates public domain material from websites or documents of the United States Board on Geographic Names.
- Mount Melbourne.jpg, USGS: United States Geological Survey
- Mount Murchison, USGS: United States Geological Survey

This article incorporates public domain material from websites or documents of the United States Geological Survey.
