= Journeys with Emperors =

2023 book by Gerald L. Kooyman and Jim Mastro

Journeys with Emperors: Tracking the World's Most Extreme Penguin
- Cover
- Author: Gerald L. Kooyman, Jim Mastro
- Language: English
- Subject: Emperor penguins, antarctic research
- Genre: Non-fiction, Science, Memoir
- Publisher: University of Chicago Press
- Publication date: November 2023
- Media type: Print (hardcover), eBook
- Pages: 256
- ISBN: 978-0-226-82438-3
- Foreword by Jessica Ulrika Meir.

Journeys with Emperors: Tracking the World's Most Extreme Penguin is a 2023 book by American marine physiologist Gerald Kooyman and co-author Jim Mastro. The book chronicles Kooyman's decades of fieldwork studying emperor penguins at Cape Washington and other colonies in Antarctica's Ross Sea. Part memoir and part scientific account, it details both the extreme challenges of Antarctic research and the remarkable adaptations that allow emperor penguins to thrive in one of Earth's harshest environments. Kooyman, who is known for using animal-tracking devices and underwater observation techniques, presents his firsthand observations of the penguins' diving abilities, which can exceed 500 meters in depth, and their hazardous annual migrations. The book includes photographs, diagrams, and links to video footage.

== Background ==
Kooyman began his Antarctic research career in 1961 when he first encountered emperor penguins at Cape Royds on Ross Island. Initially focused on studying Weddell seals for his PhD, Kooyman spent twenty years developing time-depth recorder (TDR) technology before returning to emperor penguin research in the 1980s. The selection of Cape Washington as his primary research site came after considering other Ross Sea colonies: Coulman Island proved inaccessible except by air with no suitable landing sites for C-130 aircraft, Cape Roget was too distant from McMurdo Station and lacked proper landing areas, and Cape Crozier posed extreme dangers from hurricane-force winds and unstable ice cliffs. Cape Washington offered a compromise location accessible via Priestley Glacier, though the journey required a hazardous three-and-a-half-day traverse across heavily crevassed glaciers in temperatures averaging minus 20 to 30 degrees Celsius. Kooyman's research at Cape Washington, conducted over multiple expeditions from 1986 onwards, focused on understanding emperor penguin behavior at sea, utilizing newly miniaturized tracking devices to document their diving patterns and foraging journeys. His work revealed that Ross Sea emperor penguins, unlike their counterparts featured in popular documentaries, do not undertake long marches to reach breeding sites, as the colonies are located close to reliable open water maintained by strong katabatic winds from nearby glaciers.

== Summary ==
The book weaves together Kooyman's personal experiences with scientific findings about emperor penguins, organized around the major events in the birds' annual cycle. Opening with Kooyman's first encounters with emperor penguins, the narrative establishes the harsh Antarctic setting before comparing emperor and king penguin breeding strategies.

The core chapters detail Kooyman's fieldwork at Ross Sea colonies, especially Cape Washington, where he and his teams endured months camping on sea ice to study the penguins.

The book identifies and elaborates upon four critical annual journeys undertaken by the penguins: the commuter journey, involving feeding trips during chick rearing; the fledging journey, marking young penguins' initial venture away from colonies; the pre-molt journey, where adults gather nourishment for the demanding molt period; and the post-molt journey, which sees birds returning to breeding sites.

Significant attention is given to the penguins' extraordinary diving capabilities, with dives frequently reaching depths of over 500 meters, a subject Kooyman studied using innovative technologies he helped develop, such as time-depth recorders. The work also describes interactions with predators like leopard seals and killer whales.

The final chapter discusses broader environmental concerns, and the vulnerability of emperor penguins to climate change due to the melting of essential sea ice habitats. The narrative is supported by photographic documentation, diagrams, and accessible online multimedia content that provides further context and illustrate the research and penguin behavior described throughout the text.

== Reviews ==
In his review of the book in the Wilson Journal of Ornithology, John Kricher described the work as "masterfully done and amazing in content," noting that Kooyman's decades of groundbreaking research spanned from tagging and diving with emperor penguins to studying their various colonies on Antarctic pack ice. Kricher recognized the book for documenting both the natural history of emperor penguins and Kooyman's own remarkable career, calling it "a delight to read." He particularly praised the accompanying website's video clips, which "capture the kinds of sights Kooyman routinely saw and enhance the understanding and enjoyment of the book," noting that the color plates were "excellently chosen" and added significant value to the reader's experience.

Laurence A. Marschall, in a review for Natural History, praised Kooyman's "clear and often enthusiastic writing" and recommended readers to "spend some time with these remarkable birds—and the humans that study them." Marschall highlighted the book's accessibility and the inclusion of photographs documenting both the scientific team and the penguin colonies studied over the years. He noted the authors' ability to convey complex scientific concepts while maintaining an engaging narrative style, making the work suitable for both general readers and specialists interested in Antarctic wildlife.

Laurie Unger Skinner, in a review for Booklist, characterized the work as "a treat of a book" that would have "armchair travelers, penguin lovers, Antarctic enthusiasts, and science readers rejoicing." Skinner highlighted Kooyman's innovations in tracking technology, including his development of devices to record diving depths and lengths, as well as observation cages that enabled safe underwater study of penguin behavior. She praised the book's informative sidebars, graphs, and charts for explaining technical concepts in clear language, noting that the "gorgeous photos" and annotated bibliography rounded out what she considered an exceptional account of life among emperor penguins and the challenges and rewards of Antarctic research.

Eric Wagner in the Ornithological Applications praised it as "a pleasure to read about the product of a life that sprang from some nifty gadgets and a couple of basic questions." Wagner acknowledged Kooyman's role in developing the time-depth recorder (TDR) technology, beginning with his early questions about Weddell seals' diving capabilities, which eventually led to revolutionary insights about emperor penguins. He appreciated how the book meets emperor penguins "more or less on their own terms," noting that such accounts are less common than the penguins' appearances in popular films. Wagner also acknowledged the book's ability to convey the thrill of field work, referencing how Kooyman's enthusiasm for discovery resonates throughout the narrative, particularly when describing moments like learning that emperor penguins can dive to depths exceeding 500 meters.

Donna Schulman, reviewing for the 10,000 Birds blog, described the book as "part memoir, part travelogue, part scientific narrative, part prologue to making an argument for Antarctic conservation." Schulman emphasized that reading the book was "the next best thing" to visiting an emperor penguin colony and praised its bifurcated organization that balanced adventure narratives with scientific content. She particularly appreciated the annotated bibliography, and confirmed as a librarian the helpful evaluative comments on sources, and underscored the book's "sense of wonder that infuses every chapter, whether it's about hiking over a glacier or the benefits of anaerobic metabolisms."

In his review in the Quarterly Review of Biology, Philip Trathan characterized the volume as an account of Kooyman's pioneering work in understanding emperor penguin behavior and physiology. Trathan noted that the book revealed previously unknown aspects of emperor penguin life, including the locations of molting sites and the vast scale of their foraging trips, which could exceed 1,000 miles. He emphasized how the work documents four critical journeys in the penguins' annual cycle and praised the book's environmental message regarding the vulnerability of emperor penguins to climate change and sea ice loss. Trathan concluded that the book serves as both a scientific record and a plea for conservation, making it relevant for readers concerned about the future of Antarctic ecosystems.
