= Frustum (disambiguation) =

A frustum is a portion of a solid that lies between two parallel planes cutting this solid.

It may also refer to:

- Frustum (aerospace), a kind of payload fairing
- Frustum (computer graphics), the three-dimensional region visible on the screen
- Mount Frustum, a landform in Antarctica
