= Borchgrevink Canyon =

Undersea canyon in Antarctica

Borchgrevink Canyon (70°15′S 170°15′E) is an undersea canyon on the continental rise east of Iselin Bank in the Ross Sea. It was named in association with Borchgrevink Coast, the name being approved by the Advisory Committee for Undersea Features in June 1988.
