= Random Hills =

Group of rugged hills in Victoria Land, Antarctica

- Location within Antarctica

Geography
- Continent: Antarctica
- Region(s): Victoria Land, Antarctica
- Range coordinates: 74°7′S 164°25′E

The Random Hills (74°7′S 164°25′E) are a group of rugged hills in Victoria Land, Antarctica. They are bounded on the west by Campbell Glacier and on the east by Tinker Glacier and Wood Bay. They are centered about 15 nautical miles (28 km; 17 mi)) north-northwest of Mount Melbourne.

== Exploration and name ==
The Random Hills were named by the Southern Party of the New Zealand Geological Survey Antarctic Expedition (NZGSAE), 1966–67, because of the random orientation of the ridges which comprise the feature.

== Geology ==
The Random Hills are part of the Melbourne Volcanic Province of the McMurdo Volcanic Group. K–Ar or Rb–Sr dating has given ages of 12.63 ± 0.17 million years and 12.43 ± 0.16 million years for Random Hills hawaiite.

== Location ==
The Random Hills lie between the Tinker Glacier Tongue to the east, Baker Rocks on the Mount Melbourne peninsula to the south, and Bier Point and the Campbell Glacier to the west. The Burns Glacier separates the hills from Pinckard Table to the east. The Clausnitzer Glacier flows eastward through the hills to join the Tinker Glacier.

== Features ==
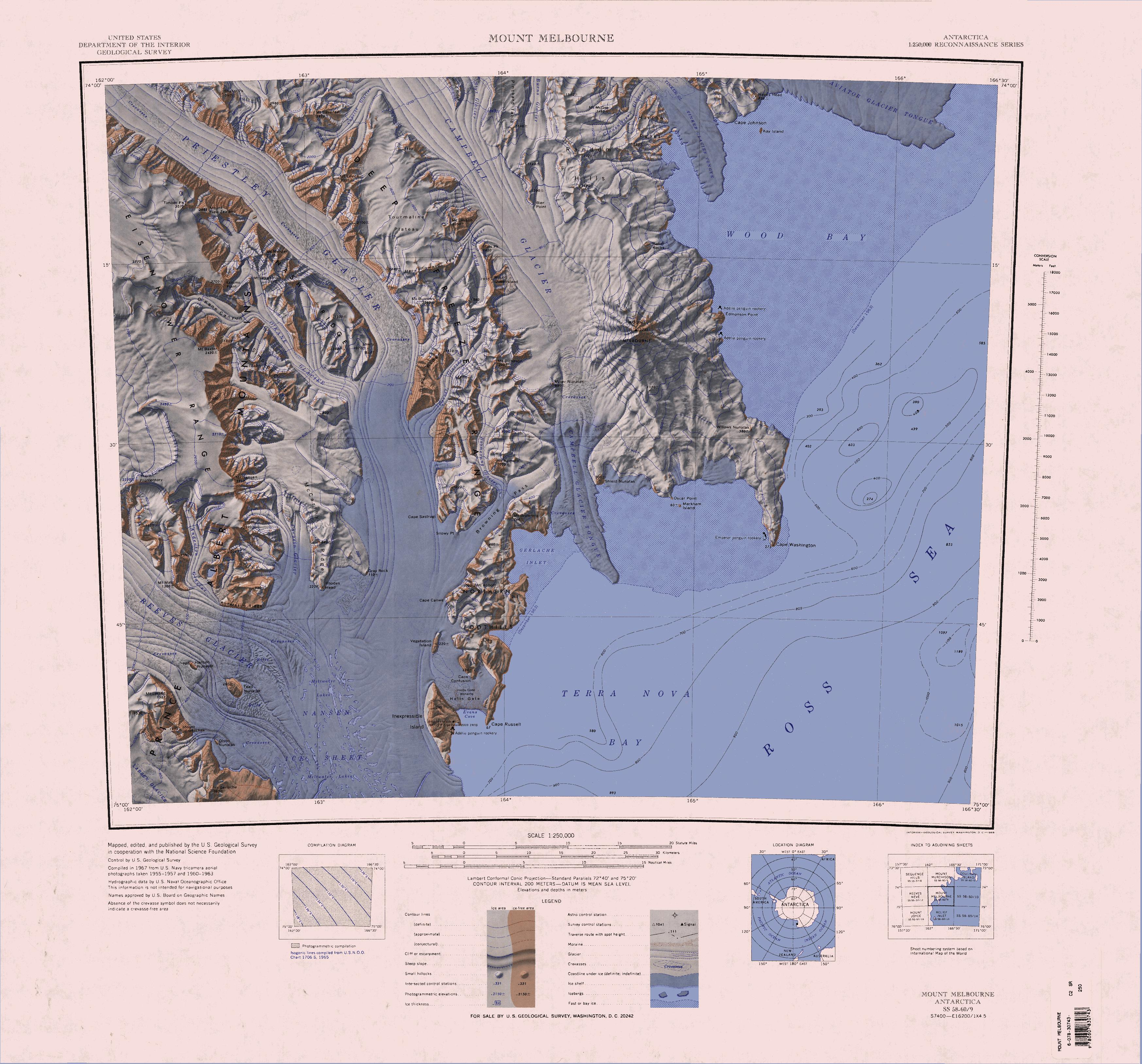
Northern Foothills between ice shelf and sea in south center of map

Features and nearby features include:

=== Harrow Peaks ===
74°04′S 164°45′E. A group of rugged peaks in the east part of Random Hills, bounded on the north by Clausnitzer Glacier and on the east by Tinker Glacier, overlooking the northwest extremity of Wood Bay. Mapped by the United States Geological Survey (USGS) from surveys and United States Navy air photos, 1955-63. Named by United States Advisory Committee on Antarctic Names (US-ACAN) for Geoffrey N. Harrow, biologist at McMurdo Station, 1965-66 season.

=== Mount McGee ===
74°03′S 164°33′E. A mountain, 1,410 metres (4,630 ft) high, rising from a ridge at the north side of Clausnitzer Glacier in the Random Hills. Mapped by USGS from surveys and United States Navy air photos, 1955-63. Named by US-ACAN for Lawrence E. McGee, geologist at McMurdo Station, 1965-66 season.

=== Baker Rocks ===
74°14′S 164°45′E. A spur-like rock exposure lying 2 nautical miles (3.7 km; 2.3 mi) west of Wood Bay and 7 nautical miles (13 km; 8.1 mi) north of Mount Melbourne. Mapped by USGS from surveys and United States Navy air photos, 1955-63. Named by the US-ACAN after Billy-Ace Baker, radioman, McMurdo Station winter party in 1963, 1967, 1971, and 1975; summer seasons, 1976-1980.

=== Bier Point ===
74°10′S 164°09′E. A projecting point on the east side of Campbell Glacier, 7 nautical miles (13 km; 8.1 mi) northeast of Mount Queensland. Mapped by USGS from surveys and United States Navy air photos, 1955-63. Named by US-ACAN for Jeffrey W. Bier, biologist, McMurdo Station winter party, 1966.

=== Pinckard Table ===
74°00′S 164°03′E. An ice-covered tableland, 8 nautical miles (15 km; 9.2 mi) long and 3 nautical miles (5.6 km; 3.5 mi) wide, rising between Styx Glacier and Burns Glacier. Mapped by USGS from surveys and United States Navy air photos, 1955-63. Named by US-ACAN for William Pinckard, biologist at McMurdo Station, 1965-66 season.

== Sources ==
- Alberts, Fred G., ed. (1995), Geographic Names of the Antarctic (PDF) (2 ed.), United States Board on Geographic Names This article incorporates public domain material from websites or documents of the United States Board on Geographic Names.
- Mount Melbourne, USGS: United States Geographic Board

This article incorporates public domain material from websites or documents of the United States Geological Survey.
