= Mountaineer Range =

Range of mountains in Victoria Land, Antarctica

- Location within Antarctica

Highest point
- Peak: Mount Murchison
- Elevation: 3,500 m (11,500 ft)
- Prominence: 2,005 m (6,578 ft)
- Listing: Ultra; Ribu

Geography
- Continent: Antarctica
- Region: Victoria Land
- Range coordinates: 73°28′S 166°15′E

The Mountaineer Range (73°28′S 166°15′E) is the range of mountains lying between the Mariner Glacier and Aviator Glacier in Victoria Land, Antarctica. It lies to the south of the Victory Mountains and northeast of the Southern Cross Mountains.

== Exploration and naming ==
The seaward parts of the Mountaineer Range were first viewed by James Clark Ross in 1841, and subsequently by several British and later American expeditions. The precise mapping of its overall features was accomplished from United States Navy air photographs and surveys by New Zealand and American parties in the 1950s and 1960s. The range was named by the New Zealand Geological Survey Antarctic Expedition (NZGSAE), 1958–59, in keeping with the backgrounds of members of the 1957–58 and 1958–59 field parties who made a reconnaissance of the area, and also in association with the names "Aviator" and "Mariner".

== Location ==
The Mountaineer Range lies to the south of the Victory Mountains and northeast of the Southern Cross Mountains. It is bounded by the Aviator Glacier which forms below the Half-ration Névé to the west, and flows south-southeast to Lady Newnes Bay. The bay forms the eastern boundary of the range. To the north it is bound by the Hercules Névé and Mariner Glacier, which flows southeast to Lady Newnes Bay. Features of the eastern part include Bunker Bluff, Engberg Bluff, Index Point, Gauntlet Ridge, Spatulate Ridge, Apostrophe Island, Caliper Cove and Cape King.

== Central features ==
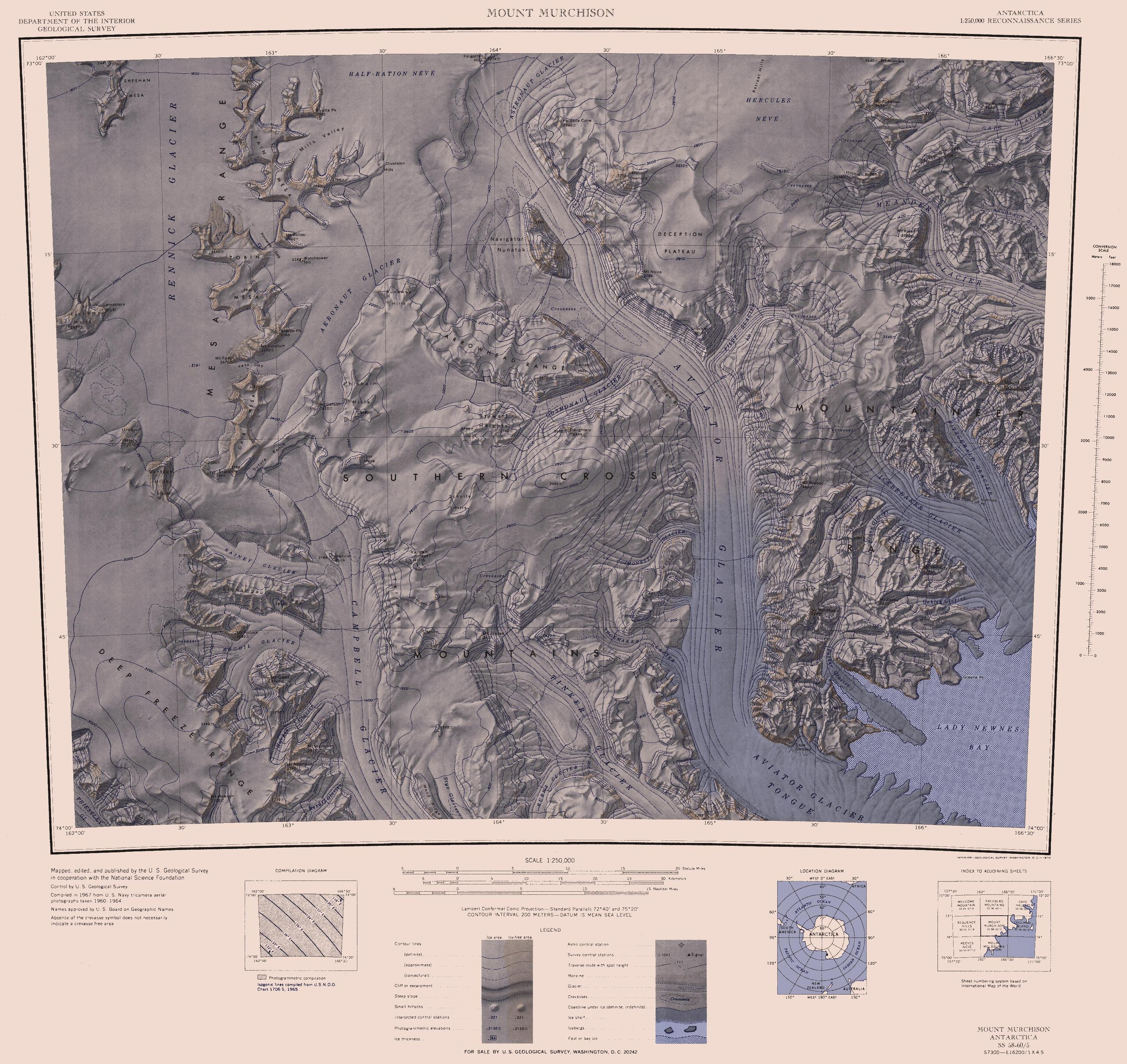
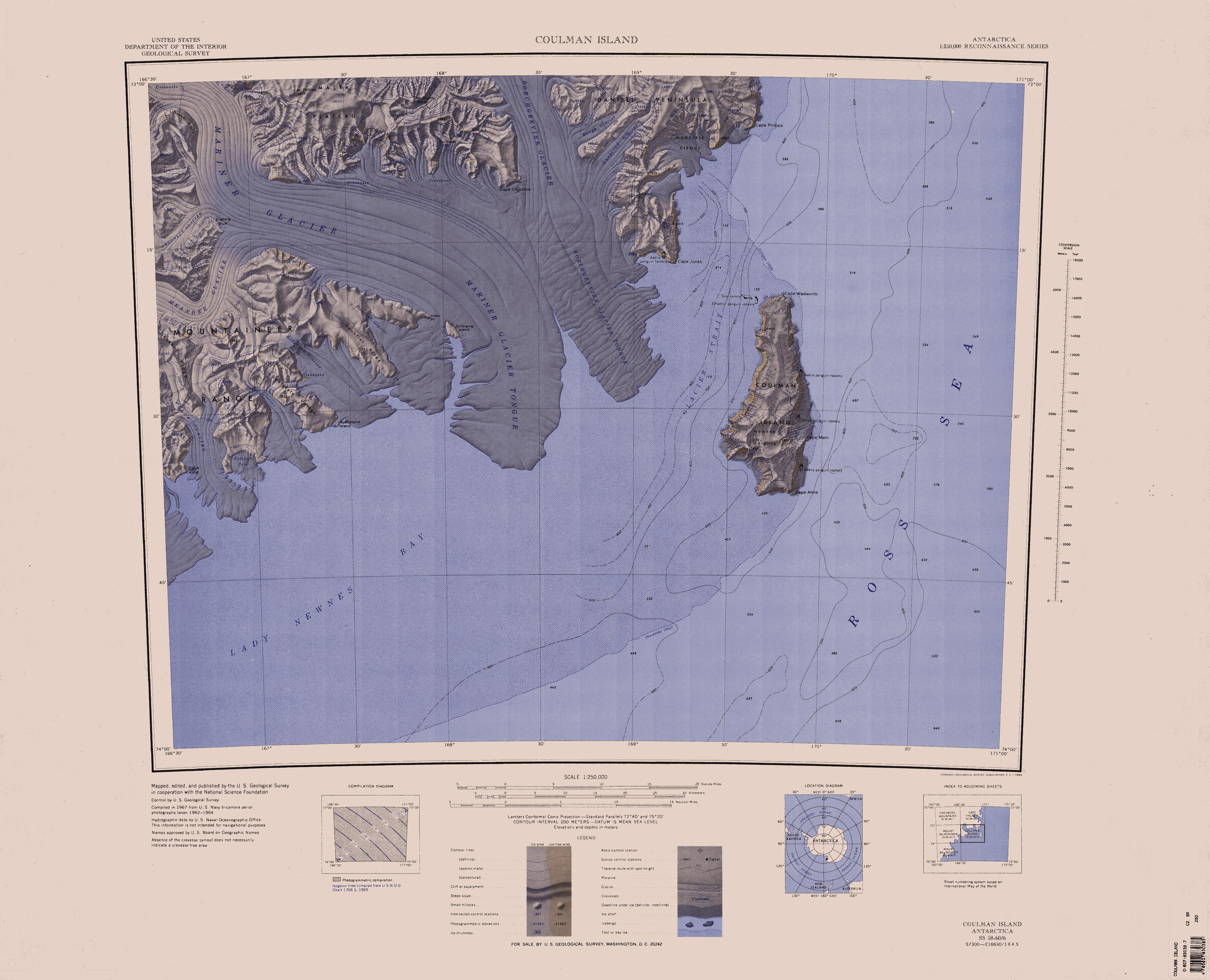
Mountaineer Range in east of interior map, west of coastal map

=== Dessent Ridge ===
73°25′S 166°37′E A mountainous, ice-covered ridge situated 5 miles (8.0 km) east of Mount Murchison. The ridge trends north–south for 10 nautical miles (19 km; 12 mi). Mapped by USGS from surveys and U.S. Navy air photos, 1960-64. Named by US-ACAN for Joseph E. Dessent, meteorologist at Hallett Station, 1961.

=== Mount Murchison ===
73°25′S 166°18′E. A very prominent mountain, 3,500 metres (11,500 ft) high, marking the high point on the rugged divide between Fitzgerald Glacier and Wylde Glacier}. Discovered in January 1841 by Sir James Clark Ross who named this feature for Sir Roderick Impey Murchison, then general secretary of the British Association.

=== Mount Rittmann ===
73°27′S 165°30′E. A large active volcano predominantly buried in ice, with several peaks reaching an estimated 2,600 metres (8,500 ft), It is included within Antarctic Specially Protected Area 175 High Altitude Geothermal Sites of the Ross Sea Region. The base of the volcano outcrops on the almost vertical cliffs of Pilot Glacier. Fumaroles and geothermally heated ground occur within a single outcrop at the summit of Mount Rittmann in a minor caldera rim at approximately 2,000 metres (6,600 ft) above sea level. Mount Rittmann was identified as a volcano by the 4th Italian Antarctic Expedition in the 1988/89 field season, and named by them in 1991 for the volcanologist Alfred Rittmann (1893-1980).

== Northern features ==
Features in the north of the range include Whitcomb Ridge, Hobbie Ridge to the west, Mount Kinet to the south, Mount Anakiwa, Mount Supernal and Mount Montreuil to the north.

=== Whitcomb Ridge ===
73°7′S 166°0′E. A high, ice-covered ridge along the south side of the head of Gair Glacier, standing 6 nautical miles (11 km; 6.9 mi) southeast of Mount Supernal. It was mapped by the United States Geological Survey (USGS) from surveys and United States Navy air photos in 1960–64. It was named by the United States Advisory Committee on Antarctic Names (US-ACAN) for Jean P. Whitcomb, radio scientist at McMurdo Station, 1965–66 and 1966–67.

=== Mount Kinet ===
73°14′S 165°54′E. A large, rounded mountain 2,180 metres (7,150 ft) high on the south side of upper Meander Glacier, 5 nautical miles (9.3 km; 5.8 mi) southeast of Hobbie Ridge. Mapped by USGS from surveys and United States Navy air photos, 1960-64. Named by US-ACAN for Urbain J. Kinet, biologist at McMurdo Station, 1965-66.

=== Mount Anakiwa ===
73°00′S 165°43′E. A small mountain 2,640 metres (8,660 ft) high situated 3 nautical miles (5.6 km; 3.5 mi) north of Mount Supernal. Named by the northern party of the New Zealand Geological Survey Antarctic Expedition (NZGSAE), 1966–67, after the Cobham Outward Bound School, Anakiwa, New Zealand.

=== Mount Supernal ===
73°04′S 165°42′E. A large double summit mountain 3,655 metres (11,991 ft) high surmounting the southeast corner of Hercules Névé and the heads of the Gair Glacier and Meander Glacier. The feature has at times been mistaken for Mount Murchison. Named by the northern party of NZGSAE, 1962–63, because of its prominent and lofty appearance.

=== Mount Montreuil ===
73°04′S 166°11′E. A mountain 2,680 metres (8,790 ft) high along the north side of Gair Glacier 8.5 nautical miles (15.7 km; 9.8 mi) east of Mount Supernal. Mapped by USGS from surveys and United States Navy air photos, 1960-64. Named by US-ACAN for Paul L. Montreuil, biologist at McMurdo Station, 1964-65.

== Western features ==
The western plateau of the range is near the head of the Aviator Glacier to the west, where it flows round Navigator Nunatak. To the north are the Astronaut Glacier, and Hercules Névé. The Pilot Glacier flows past the southeast side of the plateau into the Aviator Glacier.

=== Parasite Cone ===
73°06′S 164°18′E. A small parasite cone on the northwest flank of Mount Overlord, 6.5 nautical miles (12.0 km; 7.5 mi) distant from the latter's summit, in the Mountaineer Range. Given this descriptive name by the northern party of NZGSAE, 1962-63.

=== Mount Overlord ===
73°10′S 164°36′E. A very large mountain 3,395 metres (11,138 ft) high which is an extinct volcano, situated at the northwest limit of Deception Plateau and just east of the head of Aviator Glacier. So named by the northern party of NZGSAE, 1962–63, because it "overlords" lesser peaks in the area.

=== Deception Plateau ===
73°15′S 164°50′E. A high, ice-covered plateau, 11 nautical miles (20 km; 13 mi) long and 6 nautical miles (11 km; 6.9 mi) wide, which is bounded by Aviator Glacier, Pilot Glacier and Mount Overlord. Deception Plateau was so named by the southern party of the New Zealand Geological Survey Antarctic Expedition (NZGSAE), 1966–67, because of its deceptively small appearance when viewed from a distance.

=== Mount Noice ===
73°17′S 164°40′E. A mountain 2,780 metres (9,120 ft) high surmounting the southwest edge of Deception Plateau, 8 nautical miles (15 km; 9.2 mi) south of Mount Overlord. Mapped by the United States Geological Survey (USGS) from surveys and United States Navy air photos, 1960-64. Named by the United States Advisory Committee on Antarctic Names (US-ACAN) for Lieutenant Gary E. Noice, United States Navy, navigator with Squadron VX-6 at McMurdo Station, 1966.

=== Shockley Bluff ===
73°22′S 164°56′E. A very steep bluff forming the south end of Deception Plateau, overlooking the point where Pilot Glacier joins the larger Aviator Glacier. Mapped by USGS from surveys and United States Navy air photos, 1960-64. Named by US-ACAN for Lieutenant Commander William E. Shockley, United States Navy, officer in charge of the Squadron VX-6 winter detachment at McMurdo Station, 1966.

== Southern features ==
The southwest of the Mountaineer Range is a triangular block of mountains between Aviator Glacier to the west, Aviator Glacier Tongue and Lady Newnes Bay to the south east and Icebreaker Glacier to the northeast. The Southern Cross Mountains are to the west and south. Features include Mount Monteagle, Cape Sibbald, the Parker Glacier and Andrus Point to the south, Mount Brabec, Finley Glacier, Dunn Glacier to the north, and Mount Casey, Mount Moriarty and Oakley Glacier to the east.

=== Mount Monteagle ===
73°43′S 165°28′E. A high, sharp peak, 2,780 metres (9,120 ft) high, standing 10 nautical miles (19 km; 12 mi) north of Cape Sibbald in the Mountaineer Range of Victoria Land, Antarctica. It surmounts Aviator Glacier to the west and the large cirque of Parker Glacier to the east. It was discovered in January 1841 by Sir James Clark Ross who named this peak for Thomas Spring Rice, 1st Baron Monteagle of Brandon, Chancellor of the Exchequer from 1835 to 1839.

=== Mount Brabec ===
73°34′S 165°24′E. A mountain 2,460 metres (8,070 ft) high surmounting the east wall of Aviator Glacier 10 nautical miles (19 km; 12 mi) north of Mount Monteagle. Mapped by the United States Geological Survey (USGS) from surveys and United States Navy air photos, 1960-64. Named by the United States Advisory Committee on Antarctic Names (US-ACAN) for Lieutenant Commander Richard C. Brabec, United States Navy, Hercules aircraft commander on United States Navy OpDFrz, 1966.

=== Mount Casey ===
73°43′S 165°47′E. A mountain 2,100 metres (6,900 ft) high at the north side of the head of Oakley Glacier, 5 nautical miles (9.3 km; 5.8 mi) east-northeast of Mount Monteagle. Mapped by USGS from surveys and United States Navy air photos, 1960-64. Named by US-ACAN for Lieutenant Dennis Casey, United States Navy Reserve, Catholic chaplain with the winter party at McMurdo Station, 1967.

=== Mount Moriarty ===
73°40′S 165°58′E. A mountain 1,700 metres (5,600 ft) high located 4 nautical miles (7.4 km; 4.6 mi) northeast of Mount Casey. Mapped by USGS from surveys and United States Navy air photos, 1960-64. Named by US-ACAN after Lieutenant Commander Jack O. Moriarty, United States Navy, air operations officer at McMurdo Station, winter party 1966.

== Sources ==
- Alberts, Fred G., ed. (1995), Geographic Names of the Antarctic (PDF) (2 ed.), United States Board on Geographic Names This article incorporates public domain material from websites or documents of the United States Board on Geographic Names.
- Coulman Island, USGS: United States Geographic Board
- Mount Rittmann, AADC: Australian Antarctic Data Centre
- Mount Murchison, USGS: United States Geographic Board

This article incorporates public domain material from websites or documents of the United States Geological Survey.
