= Bowers Canyon =

Bowers Canyon (71°55′S 172°30′E) is an undersea canyon west of Iselin Bank in the Ross Sea. It was named in association with Bowers Glacier by the Advisory Committee for Undersea Features in April 1980.
