= Southern Cross Mountains =

Mountain range in Victoria Land, Antarctica

- Location within Antarctica

Geography
- Continent: Antarctica
- Region(s): Victoria Land, Antarctica
- Range coordinates: 74°7′S 164°25′E

Southern Cross Mountains is the name applied to the group of ranges lying between the Mariner Glacier and Priestley Glacier in Victoria Land, Antarctica. It is southwest of the Mountaineer Range, southeast of the Mesa Range and northeast of the Deep Freeze Range.

== Exploration and naming ==
Seaward parts of this area were first viewed by Ross in 1841 and subsequently by expeditions led by Carstens Borchgrevink, Robert Falcon Scott, Ernest Shackleton and Richard Evelyn Byrd. The precise mapping of its overall features was accomplished from United States Navy air photographs and surveys by New Zealand and American parties in the 1950s and 1960s. The mountains were named by the northern party of New Zealand Geological Survey Antarctic Expedition (NZGSAE), 1965–66.

== Location ==
The Southern Cross Mountains extend north from Burns Glacier, with the Campbell Glacier to the west and the Aviator Glacier to the east. The two glaciers are fed by the Half-ration Névé to the north of the Arrowhead Range, which is separated from the southern part of the mountains by the Cosmonaut Glacier. Glaciers flowing eastward from the mountains include, from north to south, Cosmonaut Glacier, Cosmonette Glacier, Shoemaker Glacier, Tinker Glacier and Burns Glacier. The Styx Glacier flows northwest.

Features in the northeast of the southern part include the Chisholm Hills, Mount Carson and Linn Mesa. Features in the north and northwest of the southern part include Hades Terrace, Vulcan Hills, Schulte Hills, Stewart Heights, Daughtery Peaks, Eldridge Bluff. Features further south include Daley Hills, Mount Jiracek, and Wood Ridge.

== Arrowhead Range ==
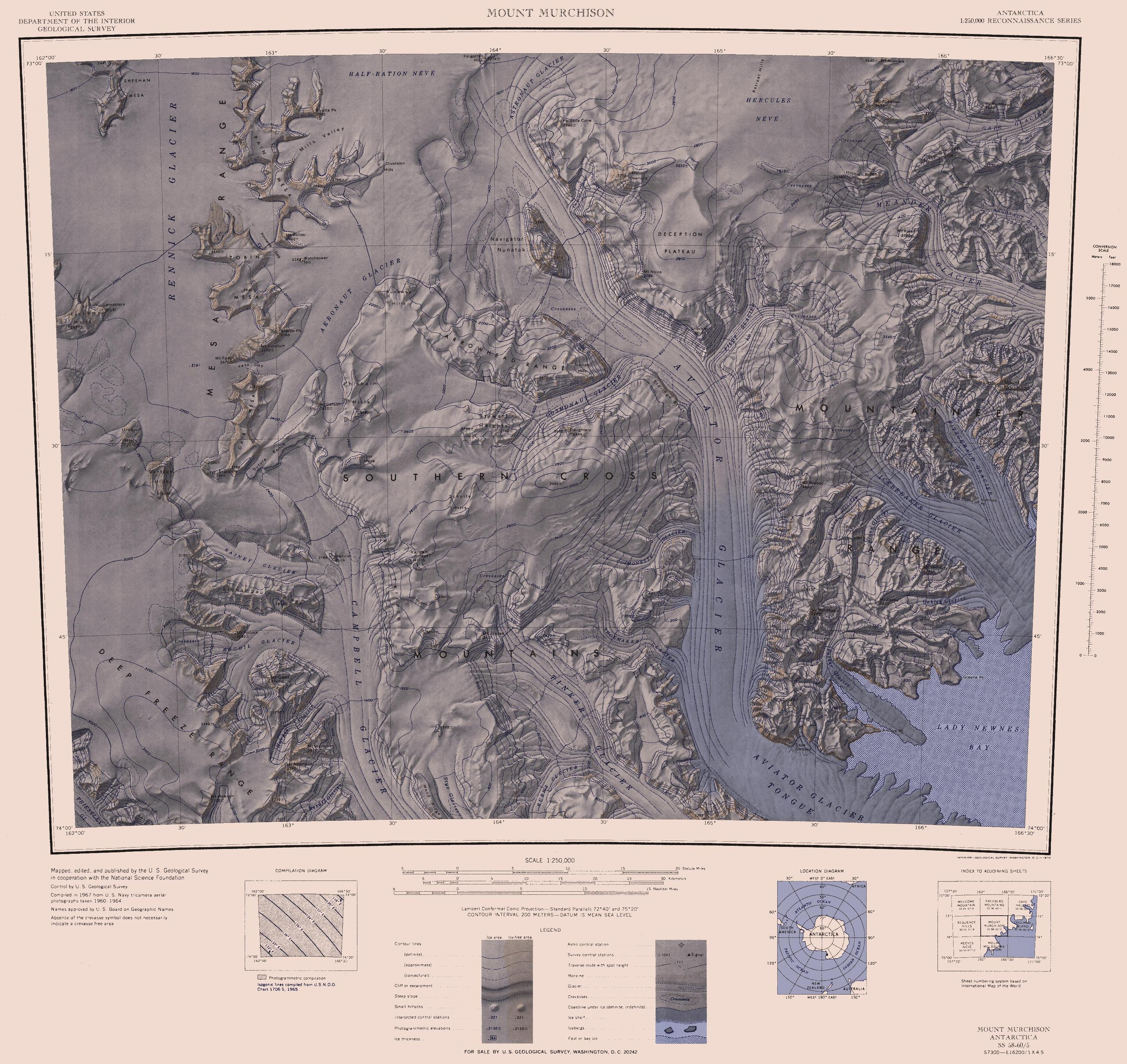
Southern Cross Mountains between

73°24′S 164°00′E. A mountain range 20 nautical miles (37 km; 23 mi) long, situated just north of Cosmonaut Glacier and west of Aviator Glacier. Mapped by United States Geological Survey (USGS) from surveys and United States Navy air photos, 1960-64. The name was applied by United States Advisory Committee on Antarctic Names (US-ACAN) and alludes to the shape of the eastern end of the range.

Geographical features of Arrowhead Range include:

=== Nathan Hills ===
73°25′S 164°24′E. A series of hills in the east part of the Arrowhead Range. Named by the southern party of NZGSAE, 1966-67, for Simon Nathan, senior geologist with this party.

=== Runaway Hills ===
73°19′S 163°33′E. A cluster of hills forming the northwest extremity of the Arrowhead Range. So named by the southern party of NZGSAE, 1966-67, because both of their motor toboggans went out of control here, when going down hill.

== Northeast features ==
=== Chisholm Hills ===
73°26′S 163°21′E. A group of steep-sided hills situated 6 nautical miles (11 km; 6.9 mi) east of Gair Mesa in the Southern Cross Mountains, Victoria Land. Named by the southern party of the NZGSAE, 1966-67, for Ross Chisholm, leader of the party.

=== Mount Carson ===
73°27′S 163°11′E. A mountain 2 nautical miles (3.7 km; 2.3 mi) west of Chisholm Hills in the Southern Cross Mountains, Victoria Land. Mapped by USGS from surveys and United States Navy air photos, 1960-64. Named by US-ACAN for Gene A. Carson, United States Navy, construction electrician at McMurdo Station in 1963 and 1967.

=== Linn Mesa ===
73°32′S 163°20′E. A small mesa located 3 nautical miles (5.6 km; 3.5 mi) south of Chisholm Hills in the Southern Cross Mountains of Victoria Land. Mapped by USGS from surveys and United States Navy air photos, 1960-64. Named by US-ACAN for Paul E. Linn, United States Navy, utilitiesman at McMurdo Station in 1963 and 1967.

== Northern features ==
Features in the north and northwest of the mountains include:

=== Hades Terrace ===
73°41′S 163°30′E. A steep, mainly ice-covered bluff along the east side of Campbell Glacier, situated just west of Vulcan Hills. Named by the northern party of NZGSAE, 1965-66, presumably from Greek mythology.

=== Vulcan Hills ===
73°40′S 163°38′E. A group of small volcanic hills about 4 nautical miles (7.4 km; 4.6 mi) southwest of Shulte Hills. Named by the southern party of NZGSAE, 1966-67, in recognition of the volcanic composition of the rocks which form these hills.

=== Schulte Hills ===
73°35′S 163°50′E. A small group of low hills lying 5 nautical miles (9.3 km; 5.8 mi) south-southwest of Stewart Heights. Named by the southern party of NZGSAE, 1966-67, for Frank Schulte, geologist with this party.

=== Stewart Heights ===
73°29′S 163°58′E. Small, partly snow-covered heights which rise to 2,760 metres (9,060 ft) high, situated just south of Arrowhead Range and between the upper forks of Cosmonaut Glacier. Named by the southern party of NZGSAE, 1966-67, for lan Stewart, field assistant with this party.

=== Daughtery Peaks ===
73°29′S 164°20′E. A small cluster of bare rock peaks 2,680 metres (8,790 ft) high that surmount the south wall of Cosmonaut Glacier. Mapped by USGS from surveys and United States Navy air photos, 1960-64. Named by US-ACAN for Franklin J. Daughtery, aviation structural mechanic with United States Navy Squadron VX-6, a participant in six Deep Freeze operations.

=== Eldridge Bluff ===
73°27′S 164°48′E. A prominent rock bluff 5 nautical miles (9.3 km; 5.8 mi) long, comprising that part of the west wall of Aviator Glacier immediately south of Cosmonaut Glacier. Mapped by USGS from surveys and United States Navy air photos, 1960-64. Named by US-ACAN for Lieutenant Commander David B. Eldridge, Jr., United States Navy, officer in charge of the winter detachment of Squadron VX-6 at McMurdo Station, 1967.

== Southern features ==
=== Daley Hills ===
73°42′S 164°45′E. A group of high, ice-covered hills along the west side of Aviator Glacier between the mouths of Cosmonette Glacier and Shoemaker Glacier. Mapped by USGS from surveys and United States Navy air photos, 1960-64. Named by US-ACAN for Robert C. Daley, United States Navy, flight engineer on Hercules aircraft during United States Navy Operation Deep Freeze, 1966, 1967 and 1968.

=== Mount Jiracek ===
73°46′S 163°56′E. A mountain 2,430 metres (7,970 ft) high rising at the west side of the head of Tinker Glacier. Mapped by USGS from surveys and United States Navy air photos, 1960-64. Named by US-ACAN for George R. Jiracek, geophysicist at McMurdo Station, 1964-65.

=== Wood Ridge ===
74°00′S 163°45′E. A flat-topped, ice-covered ridge, 7 nautical miles (13 km; 8.1 mi) long, extending in a north–south direction between Campbell Glacier and Styx Glacier. Mapped by USGS from surveys and United States Navy air photos, 1955-63. Named by US-ACAN for Vernon P. Wood, United States Navy yeoman, a member of the McMurdo Station winter parties of 1963 and 1967.

== Sources ==
- Alberts, Fred G., ed. (1995), Geographic Names of the Antarctic (PDF) (2 ed.), United States Board on Geographic Names This article incorporates public domain material from websites or documents of the United States Board on Geographic Names.
- Mount Murchison, USGS: United States Geographic Board

This article incorporates public domain material from websites or documents of the United States Geological Survey.
