= Solo Nunatak =

Nunatak in Victoria Land, Antarctica

Solo Nunatak (72°50′S 163°35′E) is an isolated nunatak lying 6 nautical miles (11 km) northwest of Intention Nunataks, at the southwest side of Evans Neve. The name alludes to the isolation of the feature and was given by the Northern Party of New Zealand Geological Survey Antarctic Expedition (NZGSAE), 1962–63.
