= Cape Washington =

Headland of Antarctica

Coordinates: 74°39′S 165°25′E

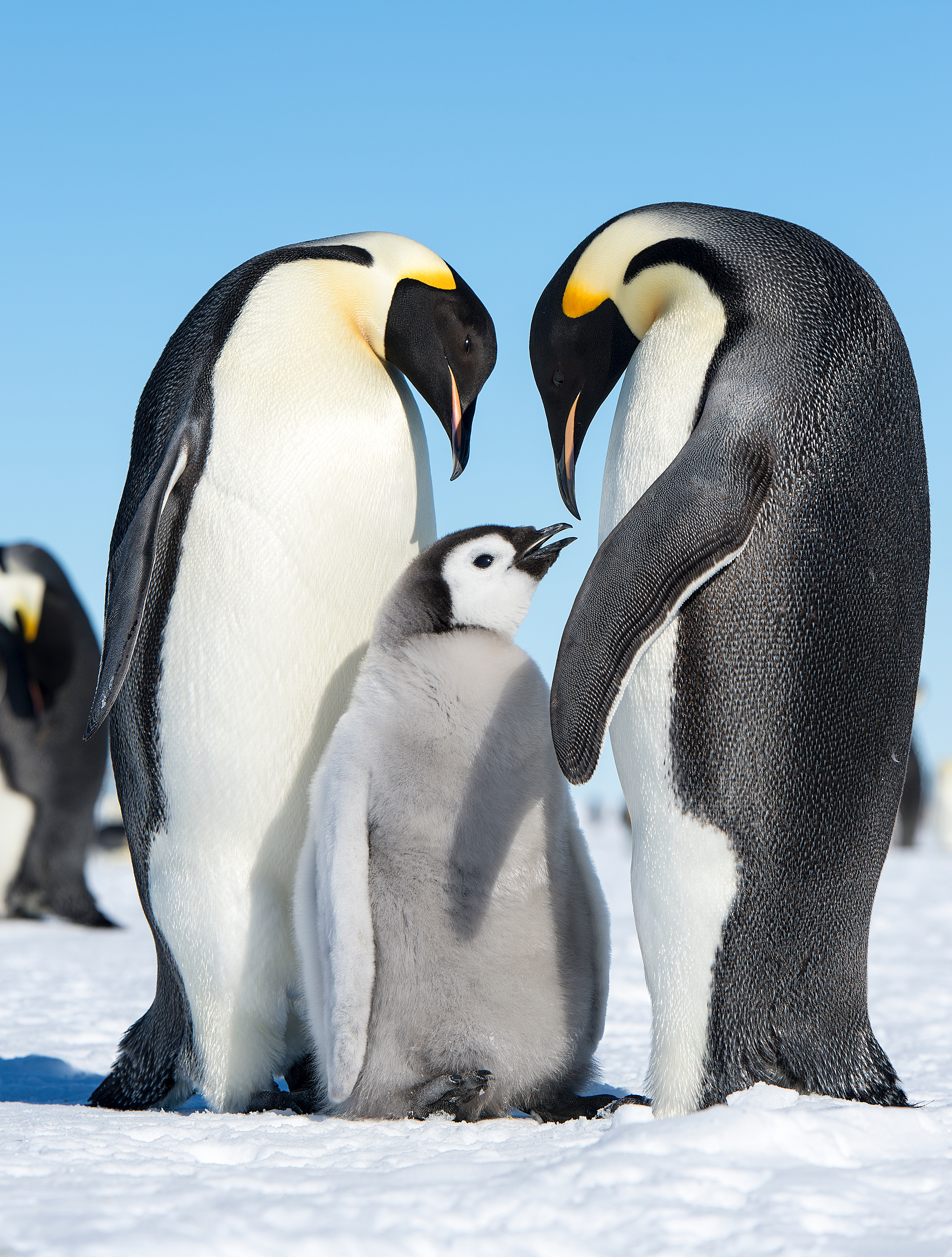
Emperor penguins breed in the IBA

Cape Washington is a prominent cape, 275 m (902 ft), marking the south extremity of the cove which separates Wood Bay and Terra Nova Bay, in Victoria Land, Antarctica. It separates the Borchgrevink Coast to the north from the Scott Coast to the south. It was discovered in 1841 by Captain James Clark Ross, Royal Navy, and named by him for Captain Washington, Royal Navy, who was secretary of the Royal Geographical Society, 1836–40.

== Wildlife ==
Cape Washington is high in biodiversity. It is home to the second-largest colony of emperor penguins in the world, with a population of over 25,000 breeding pairs. A small colony of south polar skuas, numbering over 50 breeding pairs, is present on the headland that stands high above the penguins. The huge monolith that the skuas nest on provides shelter for the tens of thousands of penguins below.

An area of 28,584 ha was designated Antarctic Specially Protected Area No.173 in 2013 for its outstanding ecological and scientific values, particularly the large emperor penguin colony. The site was also recognised as an Important Bird Area (IBA) by BirdLife International.
