= Intention Nunataks =

Nunataks in Victoria Land, Antarctica

The Intention Nunataks (72°56′S 163°46′E) are a group of peaked nunataks between Solo Nunatak and the Forgotten Hills, at the southwestern margin of Evans Névé, Antarctica. They were named by the northern party of the New Zealand Geological Survey Antarctic Expedition, 1962–63, as the surveyor's intention to place a survey station here was thwarted by weather and other factors. The topographical feature lies situated on the Pennell Coast, a portion of Antarctica lying between Cape Williams and Cape Adare.
