= Iselin Bank =

- Submerged bank Iselin Bank (Antarctica)
- Interactive map of Iselin Bank
- Ocean: Ross Sea, Southern Ocean

Iselin Bank (72°30′S 179°0′W) is a submarine bank in the Ross Sea off Antarctica. The name was approved by the Advisory Committee for Undersea Features in April 1980.

== See also ==
- Bowers Canyon
