= Borchgrevink Coast =

Portion of coast of Antarctica

Coordinates: 73°0′S 169°30′E

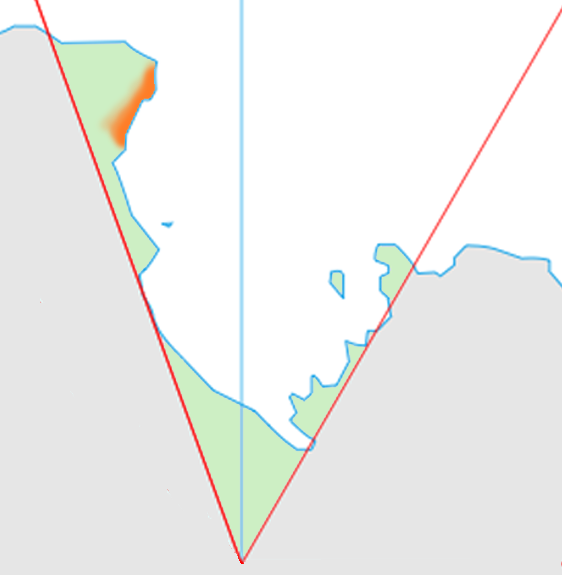
Location of the Borchgrevink Coast (marked in orange) within the Ross Dependency

The Borchgrevink Coast is a portion of the Victoria Land coastline between Cape Adare and Cape Washington. The name was recommended by the New Zealand Antarctic Place-Names Committee in 1961 after Carsten Borchgrevink, a member of Henrik Johan Bull's expedition to this area, 1894–95, and leader of the British Antarctic Expedition, 1898–1900, the first to winter on the continent, at Cape Adare.

== Landmarks ==
- Agate Peak is a peak situated in the southeast area of the Intention Nunataks, at the southwest margin of Evans Neve within the Borchgrevink Coast. So named by the New Zealand Antarctic Place-Names Committee because agate and other semi-precious stones were found here by the Southern Party of New Zealand Geological Survey Antarctic Expedition, 1966–67.

== See also ==
- Borchgrevink Canyon
