= Lady Newnes Bay =

Bay in the western Ross Sea

- Location within Antarctica
- Location: Victoria Land
- Coordinates: 73°40′S 167°30′E

Lady Newnes Bay (73°40′S 167°30′E) is a bay about 60 nautical miles (110 km; 69 mi) long in the western Ross Sea, extending along the coast of Victoria Land from Cape Sibbald to Coulman Island.

== Exploration and naming ==
Lady Newnes Bay was discovered by the British Antarctic Expedition 1898–1900 (or Southern Cross Expedition) led by Carsten Borchgrevink. He named it for Lady Priscilla Newnes, whose husband, Sir George Newnes, financed the expedition.

== Geography ==
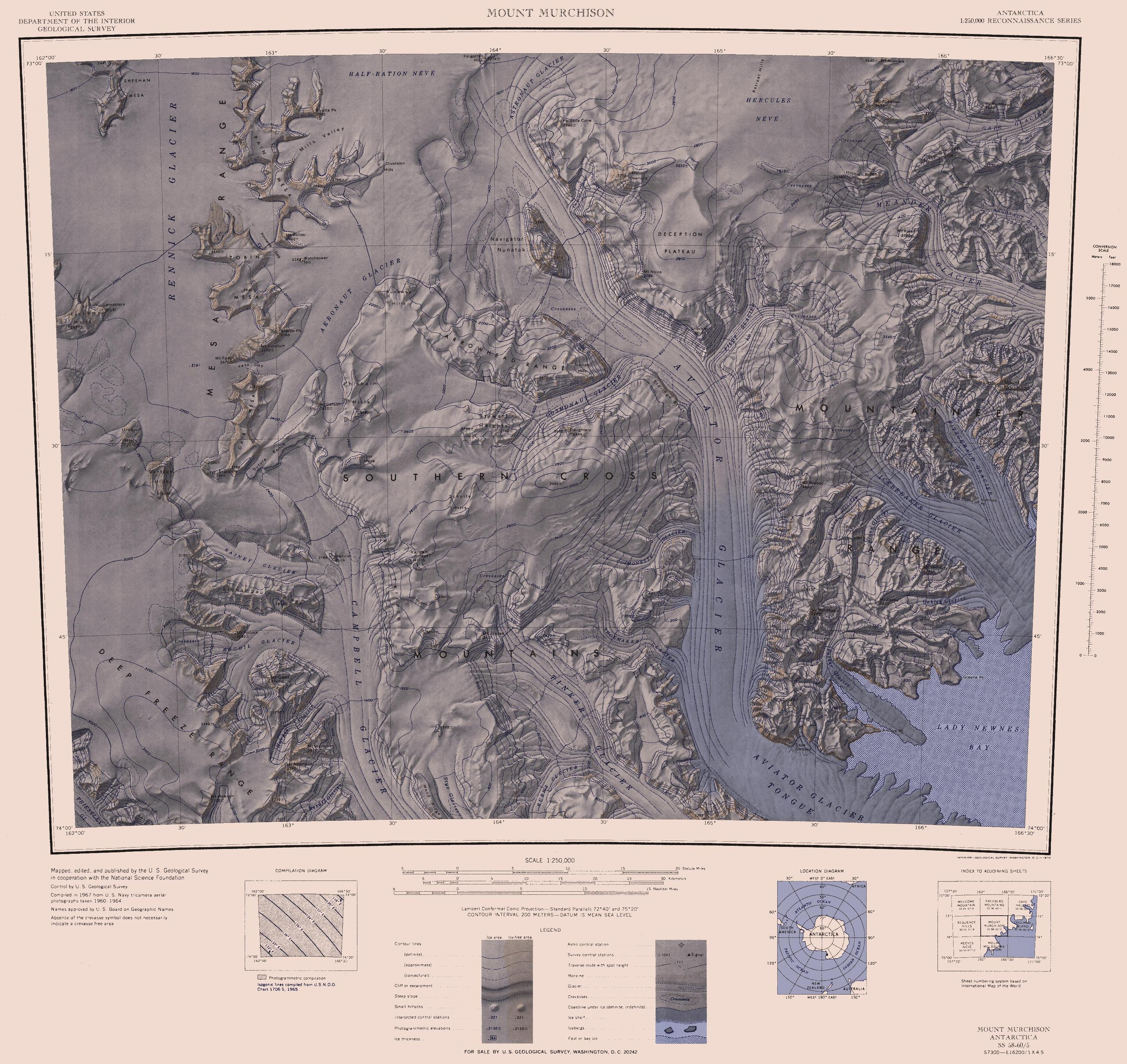
West end of bay (southeast of map)

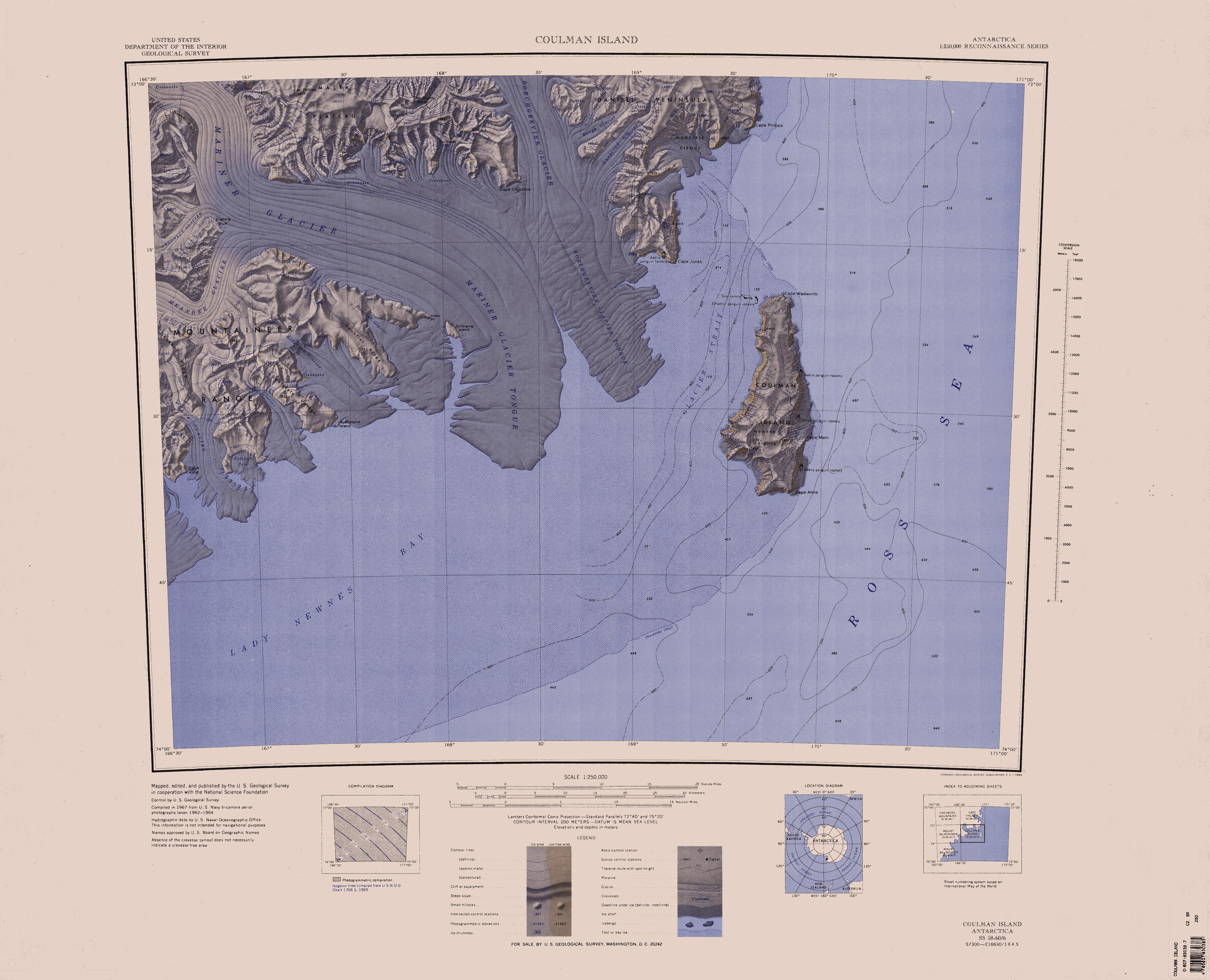
East of bay and Coulman Island

The most westerly point of the bay is Cape Sibbald, where the tongue of the Aviator Glacier extends into the Ross Sea. Further east, past Andrus Point, the Parker Glacier enters the bay from the north. East of this, past Greene Point, the Oakley Glacier enters from the north, beside the Icebreaker Glacier and the Fitzgerald Glacier, which form a common tongue. The Finley Glacier and Dunn Glacier are tributaries of the Icebreaker Glacier from the southwest.

East of Cape King the Wylde Glacier enters from the Mountaineer Range to the north, then east of Caliper Cove the Suter Glacier enters from the north. East of Spatulate Ridge and Apostrophe Island the Ridgeway Glacier enters from the north, then east of Gauntlet Ridge the Nascent Glacier enters from the north. The Mariner Glacier enters from the east of Index Point and Emerging Island, beside the Borchgrevink Glacier to the west of Cape Jones. Both these glaciers extend tongues into the bay to the west and southwest of Coulman Island, which defines the eastern end of the bay.

== Glaciers ==
From west to east, glaciers entering the Lady Newnes Bay include:

=== Parker Glacier ===
73°47′S 165°33′E. A valley glacier in the Mountaineer Range which drains the area just east and northeast of Mount Monteagle, and flows south to Lady Newnes Bay where it terminates in a floating glacier tongue adjacent to Andrus Point. Mapped by the United States Geological Survey (USGS) from surveys and United States Navy air photos, 1960-64. Named by the United States Advisory Committee on Antarctic Names (US-ACAN) for Anthony G.H. Parker, biologist at Hallett Station in 1963-64, and McMurdo Station, 1964-65 and 1966-67.

=== Oakley Glacier ===
73°42′S 166°08′E. A glacier in the Mountaineer Range that descends east from Mount Casey to merge with the floating tongue from the Icebreaker Glacier at Lady Newnes Bay. Mapped by USGS from surveys and United States Navy air photos, 1960-64. Named by US-ACAN for Lieutenant Commander Donald C. Oakley, United States Navy, Protestant chaplain with the winter party at McMurdo Station, 1967.

=== Icebreaker Glacier ===
73°37′S 166°10′E. A large valley glacier 10 nautical miles (19 km; 12 mi) northeast of Mount Monteagle that flows southeast from the Mountaineer Range to Lady Newnes Bay. Below Hermes Point, its flow coalesces with that of Fitzgerald Glacier. Named by the New Zealand Geological Survey Antarctic Expedition (NZGSAE), 1958-59, as a tribute to the work of the complements of United States Navy, and United States Coast Guard icebreakers in Antarctic exploration, in supporting scientists and in aiding other ships.

=== Fitzgerald Glacier ===
73°33′S 166°15′E. A prominent valley glacier draining to Lady Newnes Bay from the ice cascades on the south and west slopes of Mount Murchison. At the mouth it coalesces with the Icebreaker Glacier before debouching on Lady Newnes Bay. Explored by NZGSAE, 1958-59, and named by New Zealand Antarctic Place-Names Committee (NZ-APC) for E.B. Fitzgerald, deputy leader of the expedition.

=== Finley Glacier ===
73°35′S 165°38′E. A tributary glacier which drains the northwest slopes of Mount Monteagle and flows north into the upper part of Icebreaker Glacier. Mapped by USGS from surveys and United States Navy air photos, 1960-64. Named by US-ACAN for Russell H. Finley, aviation boatswain's mate with Squadron VX-6 during United States Navy OpDFrz, 1966, 1967 and 1968.

=== Dunn Glacier ===
73°36′S 165°46′E. A steep tributary glacier which drains the northwest slopes of Mount Casey and flows north to Icebreaker Glacier. Mapped by USGS from surveys and United States Navy air photos, 1960-64. Named by US-ACAN for Robert Dunn, United States Navy, commissaryman, McMurdo Station, 1967.

=== Wylde Glacier ===
73°32′S 166°42′E. A glacier situated east of Mount Murchison, draining south between Dessent Ridge and Cape King into Lady Newnes Bay. Named in 1966 by the NZ-APC for Leonard Wylde, scientific officer at Hallett Station, 1962-63.

=== Suter Glacier ===
73°31′S 167°10′E. A short glacier in the Mountaineer Range, draining southeast into Lady Newnes Bay just south of Spatulate Ridge. Named by NZ-APC in 1966 for Douglas Suter, senior New Zealand scientist at Hallett Station, 1962-63.

=== Ridgeway Glacier ===
73°24′S 167°14′E. A short glacier in the east part of Mountaineer Range, draining southeast between Spatulate Ridge and Gauntlet Ridge into Lady Newnes Bay. Named by NZ-APC in 1966 for Norman Ridgeway, senior scientist at Hallett Station, 1963-64.

=== Nascent Glacier ===
73°22′S 167°37′E. A short, fairly smooth glacier in the east extremity of Mountaineer Range, draining southeast to the coast between Gauntlet Ridge and Index Point. So named in 1966 by NZ-APC, presumably as descriptive of the emerging or youthful development of the feature.

== Other features ==
Other features along the shore of the Lady Newnes Bay include, from west to east,

=== Cape Sibbald ===
73°54′S 165°23′E. A cliffed cape at the southwest margin of Lady Newnes Bay. It marks the southwest extremity of the Mountaineer Range at the terminus of Aviator Glacier. Sighted in February 1841 by Sir James Clark Ross and named by him for Lieutenant (later Commander) John Sibbald of the Erebus.

=== Andrus Point ===
73°53′S 165°48′E. A prominent, rocky, digit-like point that juts eastward into Lady Newnes Bay toward the floating glacier tongue of the Parker Glacier. Mapped by the USGS from surveys and United States Navy air photos, 1960-64. Named by US-ACAN for Commander H.R. Andrus, logistics officer on the staff of the Commander, United States Naval Support Force, Antarctica, 1962-66.

=== Greene Point ===
73°49′S 166°09′E. An ice-covered point 7 nautical miles (13 km; 8.1 mi) northeast of Andrus Point in Lady Newnes Bay. Mapped by USGS from surveys and United States Navy air photos, 1960-64. Named by US-ACAN after Stanley W. Greene, biologist at McMurdo Station, 1964-65.

=== Hermes Point ===
73°35′S 166°13′E. The seaward end of a ridge from the Mountaineer Range, situated at the confluence of the Icebreaker and Fitzgerald Glaciers. Mapped by the USGS from surveys and United States Navy air photos 1960-64. Named by the US-ACAN for Agustive A. Hermes, Jr., United States Navy, aviation structural mechanic at Williams Field, McMurdo Sound, on United States Navy OpDFrz, 1967 and 1968.

=== Cape King ===
73°35′S 166°37′E. A cape forming the seaward end of the rocky west wall of Wylde Glacier where the glacier enters Lady Newnes Bay, Ross Sea. Mapped by USGS from surveys and United States Navy air photos, 1960-64. Named by US-ACAN for Geoffrey A. King, ionospheric and geomagnetic scientist at Hallett Station, 1958.

=== Caliper Cove ===
73°34′S 166°56′E. A rounded, ice-filled cove in Lady Newnes Bay, situated between the mouths of Wylde and Suter Glaciers. The shape of the cove and the points that encompass it are nearly symmetrical suggesting calipers; hence the name applied by NZ-APC in 1966.

=== Spatulate Ridge ===
73°28′S 167°13′E. An ice-covered ridge in the Mountaineer Range which extends southeast between Suter Glacier and Ridgeway Glacier to the coast. The name is descriptive of the shape and was applied in 1966 by the NZ-APC.

=== Apostrophe Island ===
73°31′S 167°26′E. Small ice-covered island lying close off Spatulate Ridge in Lady Newnes Bay. The name is descriptive of the appearance of the island in plan and was given by NZ-APC in 1966.

=== Gauntlet Ridge ===
73°25′S 167°35′E. A flat-topped, mainly ice-covered ridge, or peninsula, which separates the mouths of Nascent and Ridgeway Glaciers where they discharge into Lady Newnes Bay. The name suggests the appearance of the feature in plan and was applied by NZ-APC in 1966.

== Sources ==
- Alberts, Fred G., ed. (1995), Geographic Names of the Antarctic (PDF) (2 ed.), United States Board on Geographic Names This article incorporates public domain material from websites or documents of the United States Board on Geographic Names.
- Coulman Island, USGS: United States Geological Survey
- Mount Murchison, USGS: United States Geological Survey

This article incorporates public domain material from websites or documents of the United States Geological Survey.
