= Mesa Range =

Mesas in Antarctica

- Location within Antarctica

Geography
- Continent: Antarctica
- Region(s): Victoria Land, Antarctica
- Range coordinates: 73°11′S 162°55′E

The Mesa Range (73°11′S 162°55′E) is a range of flat-topped mesas comprising the Sheehan, Pain, Tobin and Gair Mesas, situated at the head of the Rennick Glacier in Victoria Land, Antarctica. It was given this descriptive name by the northern party of the New Zealand Geological Survey Antarctic Expedition (NZGSAE) of 1962–63.

== Location ==
The Gair, Tobin and Pain mesas are in the east side of the middle reach of the Rennick Glacier, and the Sheehan Mesa is on the west side. The Monument Nunataks are to the northwest, the Freyberg Mountains to the north, Half-ration Névé and the larger Evans Névé to the northeast, the Southern Cross Mountains to the east, and the Deep Freeze Range to the south.

== Sheehan Mesa ==
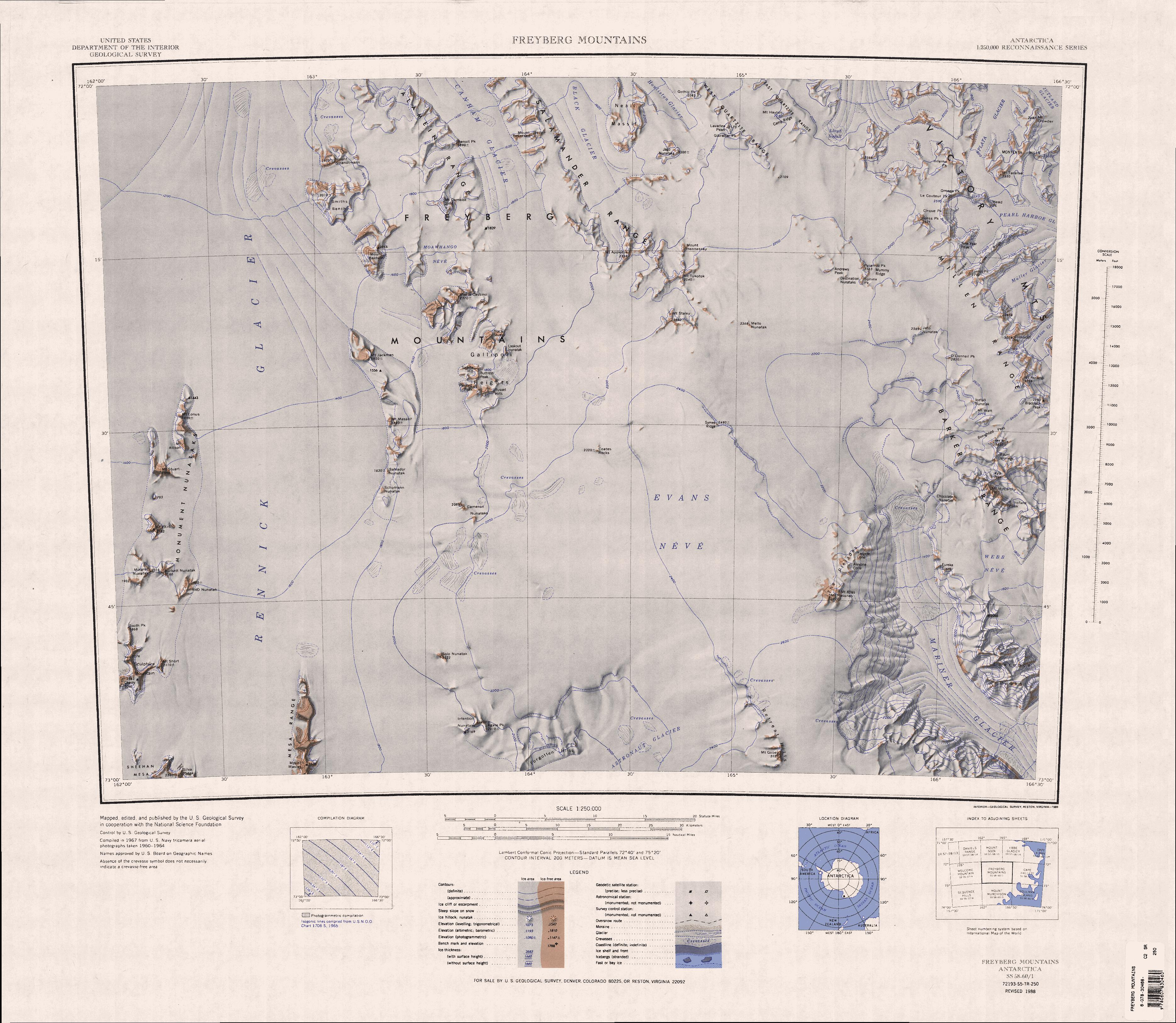
Mesa Range in southwest

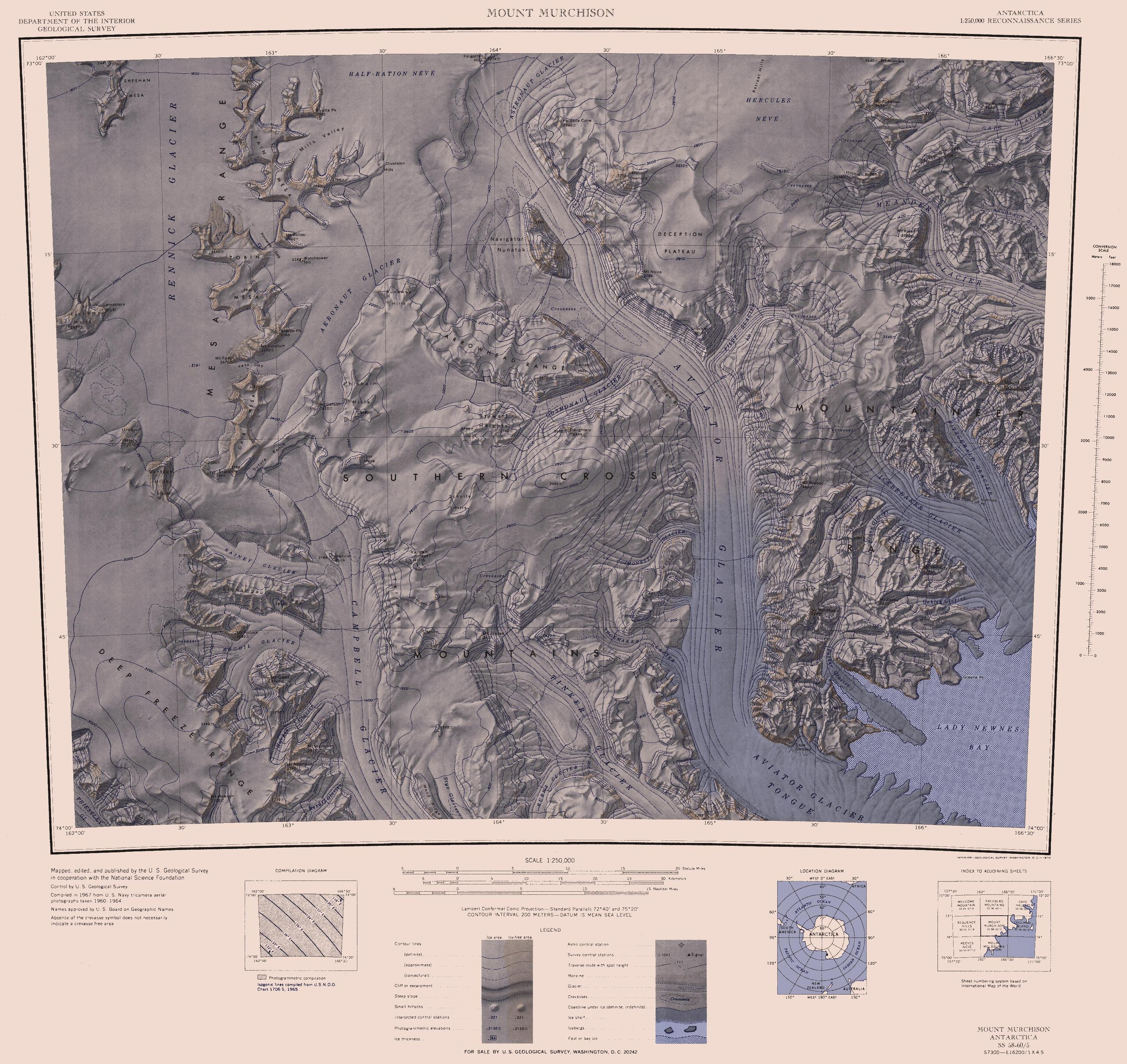
Mesa Range in northwest

73°01′S 162°18′E. A prominent mesa standing 10 nautical miles (19 km; 12 mi) west-northwest of Pain Mesa in the northwest part of Mesa Range. Named by the northern party of NZGSAE, 1962–63, for Maurice Sheehan, field assistant with this party.

=== Silva Ridge ===
72°59′S 162°17′E. A ridge leading to the top of Sheehan Mesa, on the northeast side. Large silicified tree stumps in place of growth were found halfway up this ridge, hence named Silva by the Northern Party of NZGSAE, 1962–63.

== Pain Mesa ==
73°08′S 163°00′E. A large mesa just north of Tobin Mesa in the Mesa Range. Named by the northern party of NZGSAE, 1962–63, for Kevin Pain, deputy leader of this party.

=== Mount Masley ===
72°59′S 162°54′E. A prominent flat-topped summit, 2,605 metres (8,547 ft) high, in the narrow, northern part of Pain Mesa, situated 11 nautical miles (20 km; 13 mi) east of Silva Ridge. Mapped by the United States Geological Survey (USGS) from surveys and United States Navy air photos, 1960–64. Named by the United States Advisory Committee on Antarctic Names (US-ACAN) for Andrew J. Masley, ionospheric physics scientist at McMurdo Station, summer 1962–63.

=== Biretta Peak ===
73°04′S 163°12′E. A small peak 2,530 metres (8,300 ft) high on the east side of Pain Mesa. Named by the northern party of NZGSAE, 1962–63, from its resemblance to the square cap worn by Roman Catholic and some Anglican clerics.

=== Mills Valley ===
73°06′S 163°12′E. An ice-filled valley indenting the east side of Pain Mesa between Biretta Peak and Diversion Hills. Mapped by USGS from surveys and United States Navy air photos, 1960–64. Named by US-ACAN for Commander Norman J. Mills, United States Navy Reserve, officer in charge of the Detachment A winter party at McMurdo Station, 1967.

=== Diversion Hills ===
73°09′S 163°30′E. A small group of low rock outcrops at the east extremity of Pain Mesa. Named by the southern party of NZGSAE, 1966–67, because the party diverted eastward from their route here to visit Navigator Nunatak.

=== Mount Ballou ===
73°14′S 163°03′E. A pinnacle-type mountain 2,900 metres (9,500 ft) high which forms the south end of Pain Mesa and the north side of the entrance to Pinnacle Gap. Mapped by USGS from surveys and United States Navy air photos, 1960–64. Named by US-ACAN for Commander Justin G. Ballou, United States Navy, officer in charge of the Detachment A winter party at McMurdo Station, 1966.

== Tobin Mesa ==
73°17′S 162°52′E. A large mesa in the Mesa Range, between Pain Mesa on the north and Gair Mesa on the south. Named by the Northern Party of NZGSAE, 1962–63, for James Tobin, surveyor with this party.

=== Siders Bluff ===
73°13′S 162°40′E. A bold rock bluff that forms the northwest end of Tobin Mesa. The bluff exposes an easily accessible section of Jurassic basalt. The feature was studied by Ohio State University geological parties in 1981–82 and 1982–83. Named by US-ACAN after Mary A. Siders, geologist in those field parties.

=== Pinnacle Gap ===
A gap between Pain and Tobin Mesas. The feature was traversed and so named by the northern party of NZGSAE, 1962-63, because it is readily identified by the high rock pinnacle (Mount Ballou) on the north ridge overlooking the gap.

=== Watchtower Hill ===
73°16′S 163°08′E. A small, pointed hill at the southeast side of Pinnacle Gap. So named by the northern party of NZGSAE, 1962–63, because the feature provides a good "watchtower" to the entrance of Pinnacle Gap.

=== Haban Spur ===
73°18′S 163°00′E. A bold rock spur 3 nautical miles (5.6 km; 3.5 mi) north of Scarab Peak, extending northeast from the east central part of Tobin Mesa. The feature was geologically studied by an Ohio State University field party during the 1982–83 season. Named by US-ACAN after Marta A. Haban, a geologist in the party.

=== Scarab Peak ===
73°21′S 163°01′E. A prominent peak, 3,160 metres (10,370 ft) high, located 2 nautical miles (3.7 km; 2.3 mi) northeast of Mount Frustum in the southeast end of Tobin Mesa. Named by the northern party of the NZGSAE, 1962–63, for its resemblance to a scarab beetle.

=== Mount Frustum ===
73°23′S 162°55′E. A large pyramidal shaped table mountain, 3,100 metres (10,200 ft) high, standing between Mount Fazio and Scarab Peak in the south part of Tobin Mesa. Named by the northern party of NZGSAE, 1962–63, for its frustum-like shape.

=== Mount Fazio ===
73°23′S 162°48′E. An ice-free mountain, 2,670 metres (8,760 ft) high, marking the southwest end of Tobin Mesa. Mapped by USGS from surveys and United States Navy air photos, 1960–64. Named by US-ACAN for William V. Fazio, United States Navy, helicopter crewmember during United States Navy OpDFrz, 1966, 1967 and 1968.

== Gair Mesa ==
73°28′S 162°52′E. The southernmost mesa of the Mesa Range. Named by the northern party of NZGSAE, 1962–63, for Harry Gair, geologist and leader of this party.

=== Veto Gap ===
73°24′S 162°54′E. A gap between Tobin and Gair Mesas which provides access from upper Rennick Glacier to the Aeronaut Glacier. Named "Veto" by the northern party of NZGSAE, 1962–63, because it decided that Pinnacle Gap to the north offered the better route from Rennick to Aviator Glacier.

=== Exposure Hill ===
73°32′S 162°43′E. A low hill at the southwest end of Gair Mesa. So named by the northern party of NZGSAE, 1962–63, because the west side of the hill has a noteworthy exposure of light colored sandstone.

=== Suture Bench ===
73°31′S 162°57′E. A bench-like elevation at the southeast end of Gair Mesa that overlooks the head of Campbell Glacier. Named by the northern party of NZGSAE, 1962–63, because of a dog fight here in which one dog was so badly torn that its wounds required sutures.

== Sources ==
- Alberts, Fred G., ed. (1995), Geographic Names of the Antarctic (PDF) (2 ed.), United States Board on Geographic Names This article incorporates public domain material from websites or documents of the United States Board on Geographic Names.
- Mount Murchison, USGS: United States Geographic Board

This article incorporates public domain material from websites or documents of the United States Geological Survey.
