= Wood Bay =

Bay along the coast of Victoria Land, Antarctica

- Location within Antarctica
- Location: Victoria Land
- Coordinates: 74°13′S 165°30′E

Wood Bay (74°13′S 165°30′E) is a large bay which is bounded by Cape Johnson and Aviator Glacier Tongue on the north, and Cape Washington on the south, along the coast of Victoria Land, Antarctica. It was discovered in 1841 by Captain James Clark Ross, Royal Navy, and named by him for Lieutenant James F.L. Wood of the ship HMS Erebus.

== Geography ==
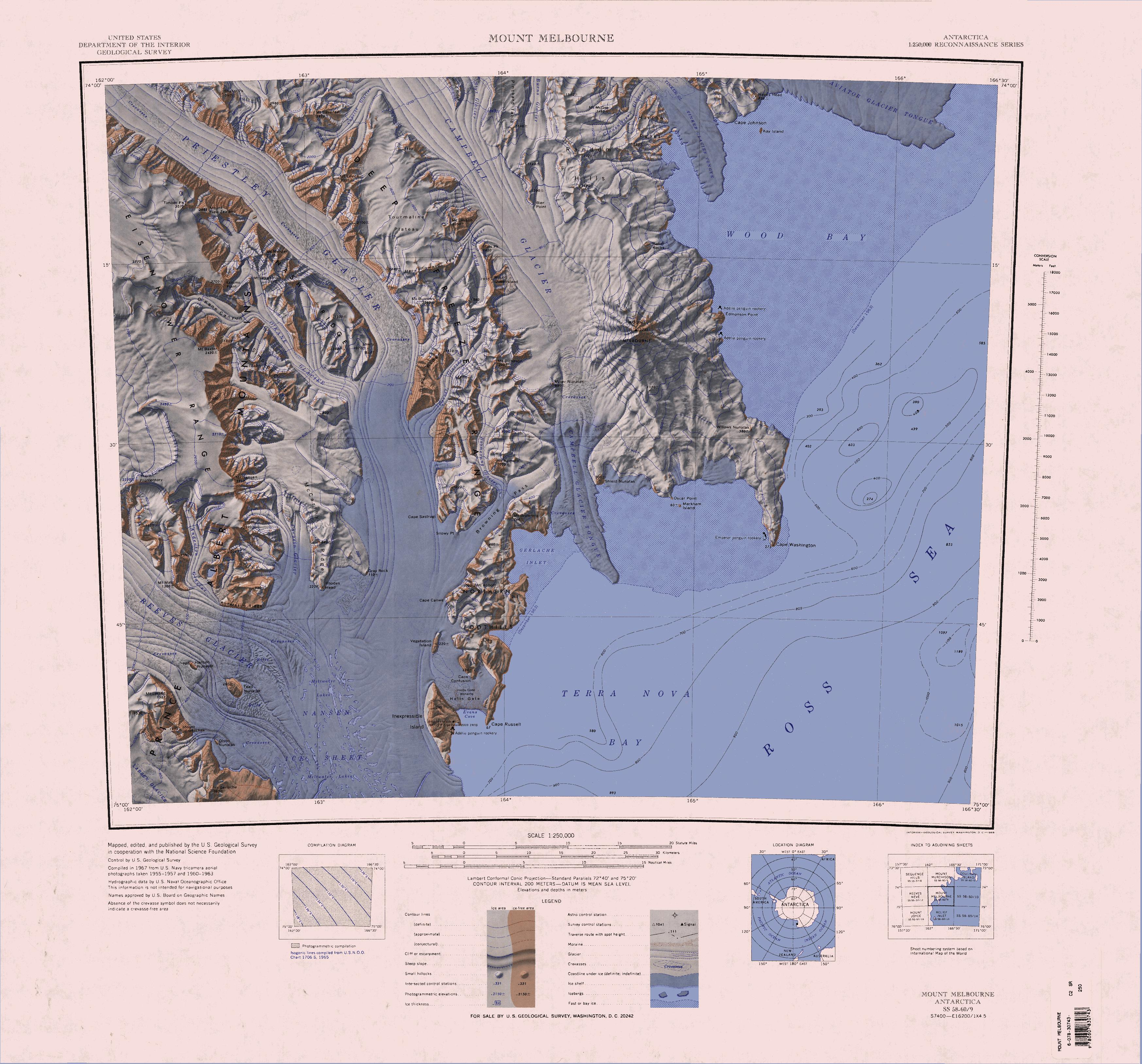
Wood Bay in northeast of map

Wood Bay is on the west coast of the Ross Sea. It is delimited to the north by Hayes Head on Cape Johnson. The Aviator Glacier Tongue extends into the sea between Wood Bay and Lady Newnes Bay to the north. The Tinker Glacier Tongue extends into the bay to the east of Cape Johnson and Kay Island, and to the west of Harrow Peaks in the Random Hills. Further south is Edmonson Point, where there is an Adélie penguin rookery, Willows Nunatak and Cape Washington, which delimited the south end of the bay. Mount Melbourne dominates the southern part of the bay.

== Features ==
Named features of the bay, from north to south, include:

=== Hayes Head ===
74°01′S 165°17′E. A prominent headland, 850 metres (2,790 ft) high, overlooking the north extremity of Wood Bay, standing 3 nautical miles (5.6 km; 3.5 mi) north of Kay Island. Mapped by the United States Geological Survey (USGS) from surveys and United States Navy air photos, 1955-63. Named by the United States Advisory Committee on Antarctic Names (US-ACAN) for Miles O. Hayes, geologist at McMurdo Station, 1965-66 season.

=== Cape Johnson ===
74°04′S 165°09′E. An ice-covered cape in northern Wood Bay at the east side of the terminus of Tinker Glacier. Discovered in 1841 by Captain James Clark Ross, Royal Navy who named it for Captain Edward John Johnson, RN.

=== Kay Island ===
74°04′S 165°19′E. A small island lying 2 nautical miles (3.7 km; 2.3 mi) east of Cape Johnson in the north part of Wood Bay. Discovered in 1841 by Captain James Clark Ross, and named by him for Lieutenant Joseph W. Kay, Dir. of the Rossbank Observatory in Tasmania, who was third lieutenant on the ship Terror. Originally charted by Ross as a group of three islands, only this one is now known to exist.

=== Edmonson Point ===
74°20′S 165°08′E. A rounded, largely ice-free point lying below Mount Melbourne along the west side of Wood Bay. Mapped by USGS from surveys and United States Navy air photos, 1955-63. Named by US-ACAN for Larry D. Edmonson, satellite geodesy scientist at McMurdo Station, winter party 1966.

=== Willows Nunatak ===
74°29′S 165°17′E. A nunatak standing 1 nautical mile (1.9 km; 1.2 mi) inland from the south shore of Wood Bay, rising above the col between Cape Washington and Mount Melbourne. Mapped by USGS from surveys and United States Navy air photos, 1955-63. Named by US-ACAN for A.O. Dennis Willows, biologist at McMurdo Station, summer 1965-66.

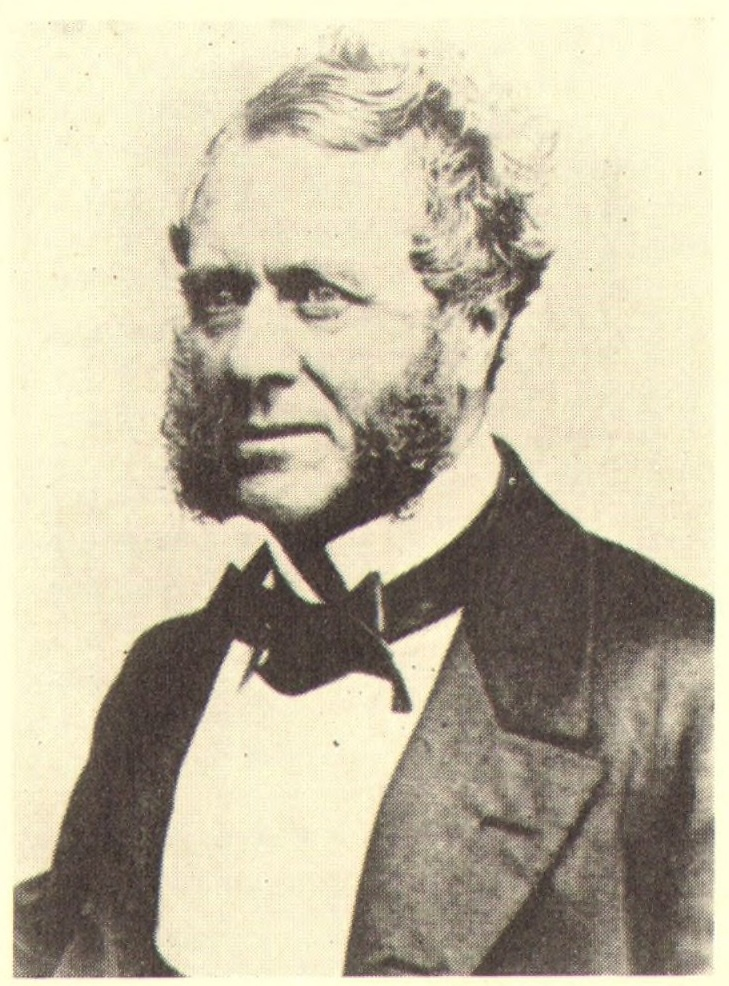
John Washington

=== Cape Washington ===
74°39′S 165°25′E. A prominent cape, 275 metres (902 ft) high, marking the south extremity of the peninsula which separates Wood Bay and Terra Nova Bay. Discovered in 1841 by Captain James Clark Ross, and named by him for Captain John Washington, Royal Navy, who was secretary of the Royal Geographical Society, 1836-40.

== Sources ==
- Alberts, Fred G., ed. (1995), Geographic Names of the Antarctic (PDF) (2 ed.), United States Board on Geographic Names This article incorporates public domain material from websites or documents of the United States Board on Geographic Names.
- Coulman Island, USGS: United States Geological Survey
- Mount Melbourne.jpg, USGS: United States Geological Survey

This article incorporates public domain material from websites or documents of the United States Geological Survey.
