= Aviator Glacier =

Glacier in Antarctica

- Location within Antarctica
- Location: Victoria Land
- Coordinates: 73°50′S 165°03′E
- Length: 96 km (60 mi)
- Width: 8 km (5.0 mi)
- Terminus: Lady Newnes Bay

The Aviator Glacier (73°50′S 165°03′E) is a major valley glacier in Antarctica that is over 60 nautical miles (110 km; 69 mi) long and 5 nautical miles (9.3 km; 5.8 mi) wide, descending generally southward from the plateau of Victoria Land along the west side of Mountaineer Range, and entering Lady Newnes Bay between Cape Sibbald and Hayes Head where it forms a floating tongue.

== Exploration and naming ==
The glacier was photographed from the air by Captain W.M. Hawkes, United States Navy, on the historic first flight from New Zealand to McMurdo Sound on December 17, 1955. An attempt to reconnoiter it by helicopter and to land a party of the New Zealand Geological Survey Antarctic Expedition (NZGSAE) on it had to be abandoned when USS Glacier was damaged in pressure ice in December 1958. It was named by NZGSAE, 1958–59, as a tribute to the hazardous work of pilots and other airmen in Antarctic exploratory and scientific operations.

== Geography ==
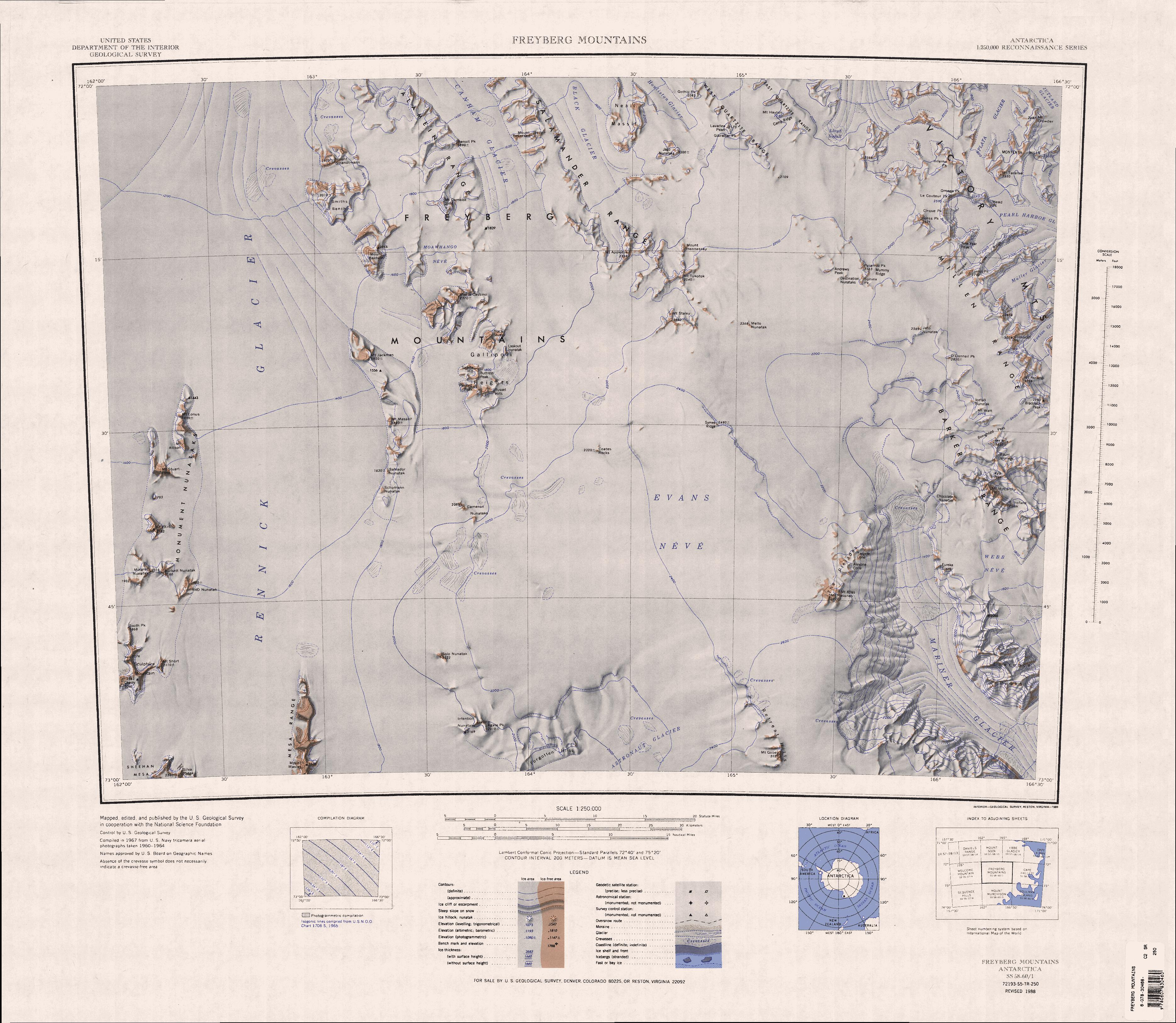
Upper region

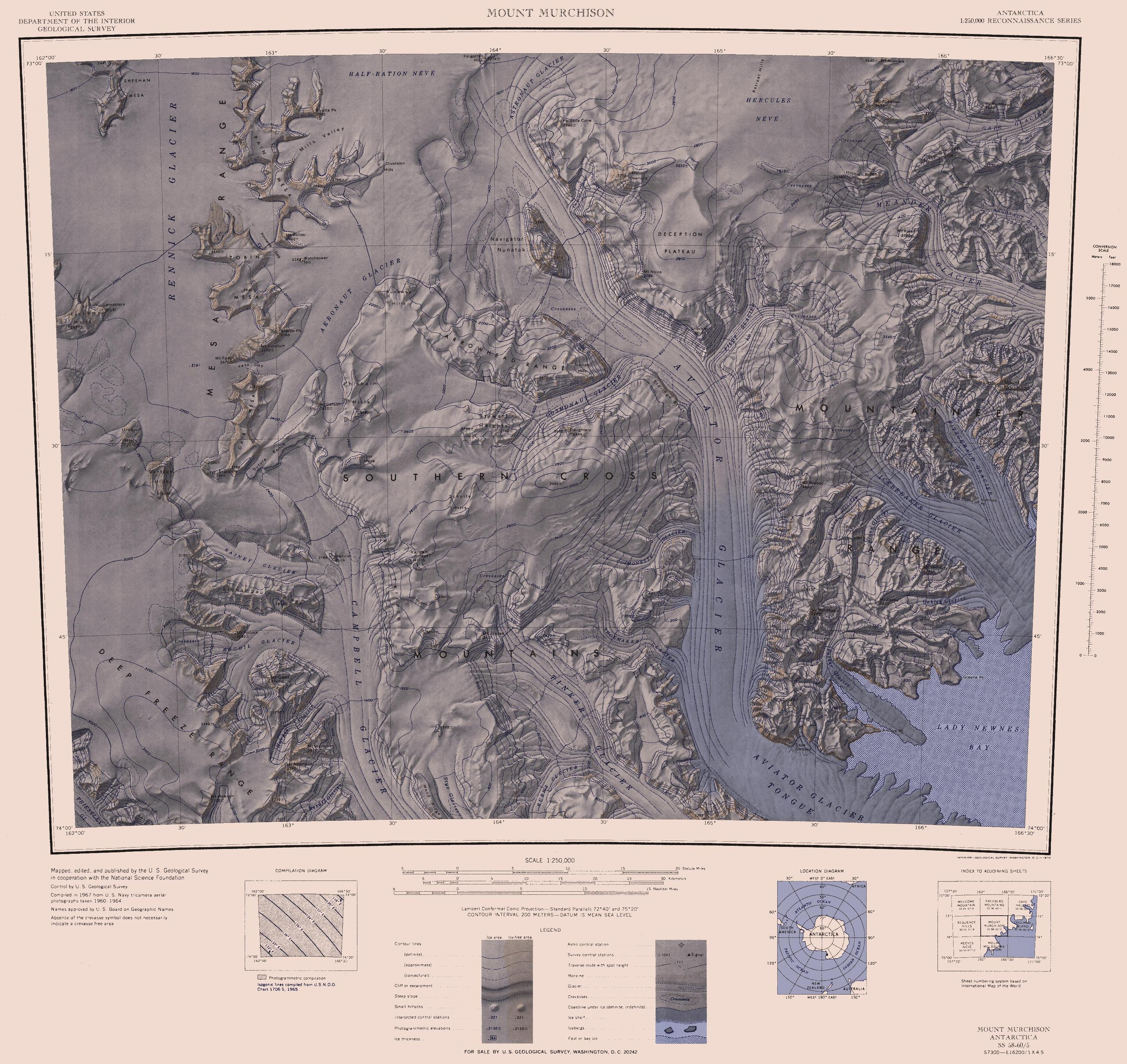
Aviator Glacier and the Southern Cross Mountains

The Aviator Glacier forms on the plateau of Victoria Land and flows in a generally southward direction along the west side of Mountaineer Range. The head of the glacier is below Half-Ration Névé and the Forgotten Hills. The Astronaut glacier forms to the south of Evans Névé and to the west of Retreat Hills and Mount Gobey. It flows southwest to join the Aviator Glacier just west of Parasite Cone. The combined glacier flows past both sides of Navigator Nunatak. The Aeronaut Glacier forms below Gair Mesa and flows north east, then east to join the Aviator Glacier south of Navigator Nunatak. The Aviator Glacier flows southeast past the Arrowhead Range, where it is joined from the west by the Cosmonaut Glacier. It is then joined from the northeast by the Pilot Glacier and turns south, past the Southern Cross Mountains to the west, from which it is joined by Cosmonette Glacier and Shoemaker Glacier, before turning southeast and forming the Aviator Glacier Tongue, which extends into Lady Newnes Bay to the east of Cape Sibbald and west of Wood Bay.

== Right tributaries ==
Tributaries from the right (west) include, from north to south:

=== Aeronaut Glacier ===
73°16′S 163°36′E. A glacier of low gradient, about 25 nautical miles (46 km; 29 mi) long, draining northeast from Gair Mesa into the upper part of Aviator Glacier near Navigator Nunatak. Named by the northern party of NZGSAE, 1962–63, to commemorate the air support provided by United States Navy Squadron VX-6, and in association with Aviator Glacier.

=== Cosmonaut Glacier ===
73°26′S 164°30′E. A tributary glacier 15 nautical miles (28 km; 17 mi) long in the Southern Cross Mountains, flowing east along the south side of Arrowhead Range to enter Aviator Glacier. Named by the northern party of NZGSAE, 1962–63, in association with Aviator, Aeronaut, and Astronaut Glaciers.

=== Cosmonette Glacier ===
73°37′S 164°51′E. A tributary glacier in the Southern Cross Mountains, flowing east along the north side of Daley Hills to Aviator Glacier. Named by the northern party of NZGSAE, 1962–63, in association with Cosmonaut and Aeronaut Glaciers and to commemorate the first woman astronaut.

=== Shoemaker Glacier ===
73°47′S 164°45′E. A tributary glacier in the Southern Cross Mountains, flowing east along the south side of Daley Hills to Aviator Glacier. Mapped by the United States Geological Survey (USGS) from surveys and United States Navy air photos, 1960-64. Named by the United States Advisory Committee on Antarctic Names (US-ACAN) after Lieutenant (later Captain) Brian H. Shoemaker, United States Navy, helicopter pilot with Squadron VX-6 at McMurdo Station, 1967.

== Left tributaries ==
Tributaries from the left (east) include, from north to south:

=== Astronaut glacier ===
73°05′S 164°05′E. A broad southwest flowing tributary to upper Aviator Glacier, joining the latter just west of Parasite Cone. Named by the northern party of NZGSAE, 1962–63, in association with nearby Aeronaut Glacier.

=== Co-pilot Glacier ===
73°11′S 164°22′E. A short, steep tributary glacier, flowing from the west and south slopes of Mount Overlord to the upper part of Aviator Glacier. Named by the northern party of NZGSAE, 1962–63, in recognition of services rendered by pilots of United States Navy Squadron VX-6, and in association with nearby Pilot Glacier.

=== Pilot Glacier ===
73°23′S 165°03′E. A short, deeply entrenched tributary glacier in the Mountaineer Range, descending along the southeast side of Deception Plateau to enter Aviator Glacier. Named by the northern party of NZGSAE, 1962–63, in recognition of services rendered by pilots of United States Navy Squadron VX-6 in Antarctica, and in association with Aviator Glacier.

== Other features ==
=== Half-ration Névé ===
73°01′S 163°30′E. A large névé at the head of Aviator Glacier. It is largely enclosed on the west side by the Mesa Range. So named by the northern party of NZGSAE, 1962–63, because its resupply was delayed several days by blizzards and the party was limited to reduced rations.

=== Forgotten Hills ===
72°59′S 164°00′E. A small group of hills 6 nautical miles (11 km; 6.9 mi) southeast of the Intention Nunataks, at the west side of the head of Astronaut Glacier. Named by the Southern Party of NZGSAE, 1966–67, because none of the three parties that had visited the area had time to examine these hills.

=== Retreat Hills ===
72°59′S 165°12′E. A group of hills at the south side of the head of Astronaut Glacier, along the south margin of Evans Névé. So named by the Northern Party of NZGSAE, 1962–63, which had hoped to visit the hills, but was forced to beat a hasty retreat due to blizzards.

=== Mount Gobey ===
72°58′S 165°15′E. The highest mountain, 3,125 metres (10,253 ft) high, in the Retreat Hills, at the south margin of Evans Névé. Climbed on Dec. 26,1966 by the Northern Party of NZGSAE, 1966–67, who named it for the party's field assistant, Dave .W. Gobey.

=== Navigator Nunatak ===
73°15′S 164°13′E. A large nunatak in the middle of the head of Aviator Glacier. Named by the northern party of NZGSAE, 1962–63, because it is a good landmark for navigation and the name is also in association with Aviator, Pilot, and Co-pilot Glaciers, nearby.

=== Aviator Glacier Tongue ===
74°00′S 165°50′E. The seaward extension of Aviator Glacier into the Ross Sea, between Wood Bay and Lady Newnes Bay along the coast of Victoria Land. The name was recommended by US-ACAN in association with Aviator Glacier.

== Sources ==
- Alberts, Fred G., ed. (1995), Geographic Names of the Antarctic (PDF) (2 ed.), United States Board on Geographic Names This article incorporates public domain material from websites or documents of the United States Board on Geographic Names.
- Freyberg Mountains, USGS: United States Geological Survey
- Mount Murchison, USGS: United States Geological Survey

This article incorporates public domain material from websites or documents of the United States Geological Survey.
