= Dan Costa =

Dan Costa may refer to:

- Dan Costa (journalist), editor-in-chief of PC Magazine
- Dan Costa (composer) (born 1989), jazz pianist and composer
- Dan Costa (scientist), Antarctic ecologist and physiologist
