= Mandible (disambiguation) =

The mandible is the lower jawbone of a vertebrate animal. Mandible may also refer to:

- Mandible (arthropod mouthpart), one of several mouthparts in arthropods
- Mandible (insect mouthpart), one of several mouthparts in insects
- Human mandible, the lower jawbone in humans
- Mandible Cirque, Antarctica

== Entertainment ==
- Mandibles (film), a 2020 French film
- The Mandibles, a 2016 American novel
- "Mandible", a song by Odette from the 2021 album Herald

== See also ==
- Mandibular (disambiguation)
