= Ocean Tracking Network =

Global network research and monitoring efforts to study fish migration

- Headquarters: Halifax, Nova Scotia, Canada
- Area served: Most of Canada
- Key people: Sara Iverson
- Website: https://oceantrackingnetwork.org

The Ocean Tracking Network (OTN) is a global network research and monitoring effort using implanted acoustic transmitters to study fish migration patterns. It is based at Dalhousie University in Nova Scotia. The technology used by the Ocean Tracking Network comes from the Pacific Ocean Shelf Tracking Project (POST) and the Tagging of Pacific Pelagics (TOPP) project.

== History ==
The Ocean Tracking Network (OTN) began at Dalhousie University in 2008. Sara Iverson is the current science director of OTN.

== Operations ==
OTN operates a fleet of autonomous vehicles—Teledyne Webb Slocum gliders and Liquid Robotics Wave Gliders. The TWS gliders are electrically powered and collect physical, biological and chemical information. The LRW glides are solar and wave powered. They each gather data on weather and sea surface conditions. Additionally, OTN maintains a rental fleet of Innovasea Vemco acoustic receiver units for use by those in academia, government, non-profits and industry.

== Funding ==
The program received an initial $35 million in funding to support global monitoring infrastructure, governance, and operations from the Canadian Foundation for Innovation’s (CFI) International Joint Venture Fund (IJVF), and in 2022 received an additional $38.5 million in funding.The Natural Sciences and Engineering Research Council of Canada (NSERC) gave $10 million in network funding; and additional funding was received from the Social Sciences and Humanities Research Council (SSHRC) and international partnerships.

OTN and the Prince William Sound Science Center formed a partnership in 2013, to support the science center’s Pacific Ocean Shelf Tracking (POST) project.

== Partnerships ==
The European Tracking Network (ETN) is a main partner of the OTN.
