= Costa Spur =

Mountain in Ross Dependency, Antarctica

- Location within Antarctica

Highest point
- Coordinates: 73°08′00″S 169°10′00″E

Geography
- Location: Daniell Peninsula, Borchgrevink Coast, Antarctica

Geology
- Mountain type: Spur

Costa Spur (73°08′00″S 169°10′00″E) is a prominent spur 4 mi southwest of Quetin Head, Daniell Peninsula, Borchgrevink Coast. The spur descends eastward to the Ross Sea and marks the southern extent of the Mandible Cirque. Named by the Advisory Committee on Antarctic Names in 2005 after Daniel P. Costa, Professor of Ecology and Evolutionary Biology, University of California, Santa Cruz, who studied seals at McMurdo Sound and Livingston Island in several field seasons from 1977; he was chief scientist aboard the Nathaniel B. Palmer for two winter cruises associated with the U.S. Southern Ocean Global Ocean Ecosystem Dynamics (GLOBEC) projects, in 2001 and 2002.
