= Royal Purple (newspaper) =

UW Whitewater student newspaper

Royal Purple logo

Royal Purple is a student-run weekly newspaper at the University of Wisconsin–Whitewater in Whitewater, Wisconsin. It publishes online every Monday throughout the academic year, as well as quarterly seasonal print issues at 75 locations across the campus, city and at the UW-Whitewater at Rock County extension.

Begun in 1901, the paper was originally a monthly literary magazine for the Whitewater Normal School. The original staff included seven editors and four reporters. The newspaper now consists of approximately 30 members each year in advertising, editorial and multimedia departments.

The current sections of the newspaper are Campus News, Opinions, Arts & Recreation, Lifestyle, Business & Technology, Community News and Sports. The paper currently publishes 5,000 issues printed at the start of each academic quarter in the fall and spring semesters .

== History ==
The Royal Purple began as monthly literary magazine and became a weekly newspaper on April 1, 1913. The four-page paper sold subscriptions for 75 cents per year. In May 1928, UW–Whitewater started awarding credit points to students working for the newspaper. That same year, the Royal Purple began providing free copies to all students. Subscriptions were offered to non-students.

The Royal Purple has switched between a bi-weekly and weekly newspaper over the course of its history. In 1992, it switched back to being a weekly newspaper and made the change from a broadsheet to tabloid style production. The word “The” in front of Royal Purple has also been switched in and out over the newspaper's life. Color debuted on the front page of the paper for the first time in spring 1999.

An online edition of the Royal Purple was started in February 2000. It was known as www.purpleonline.com. A new website, www.royalpurplenews.com, was debuted in 2007. The website saw a second upgrade and full redesign in the summer of 2016.

== Awards ==
The Royal Purple has won hundreds of awards over the course of its history for the entire organization, as well as for individual students. The newspaper consistently submits entries into the Associated Collegiate Press, College Media Association and the Wisconsin Newspaper Association competitions.
