= E-edition =

E-edition or eEdition may refer to:

- Digital edition, a magazine or newspaper delivered in electronic form
- Ebook, a book publication available in electronic form
- Online magazine, a magazine published on the Internet or through another electronic method
- Online newspaper, a version of a newspaper delivered online, or a standalone publication
