= Birgitte McDonald =

Physiological and behavioral ecologist

Birgitte "Gitte" McDonald
- Education: University of California, Santa Cruz (B.S.), Sonoma State University (M.S.), University of California, Santa Cruz (Ph.D.)
- Scientific career
- Fields: Marine Vertebrate Ecology, Physiology and Behavior
- Website: https://mlml.sjsu.edu/birdmam/

Birgitte (Gitte) McDonald is a physiological and behavioral ecologist as Moss Landing Marine Laboratories (MLML) in California. She leads MLML's Vertebrate Ecology Lab and is known for her research on Antarctic fur seals and Emperor penguins.

== Early life and education ==
McDonald obtained a B.S. in Biology at University of California, Santa Cruz (UCSC) in 1999, studying pinniped behavioral in the Cognition and Sensory Systems lab at UCSC's Long Marine Laboratory. She then obtained a M.S.in Biology from Sonoma State University in 2003, focusing on physiological and behavioral determinants of lactation efficiency in Northern elephant seals. She returning to UCSC to work with Dan Costa in the UCSC Ecology and Evolutionary Biology Department a Ph.D. in 2009. Her dissertation research focused on the physiology and energetics of Antarctic fur seals and she discovered that warmer, wetter weather in Antarctica due to climate change leads to lower survival rates for seal pups.

== Career and impact ==
McDonald continued as a postdoctoral researcher at the Scripps Institution of Oceanography in the Center for Marine Biotechnology and Biomedicine. There, she studied the diving physiology of California sea lions, learning that they collapse their lungs at depth to reduce nitrogen adsorption, which prevents decompression sickness and actively conserves oxygen for the final segment of dives. From 2013 to 2014, McDonald was a postdoctoral researcher at Aarhus University under the zoophysiology department, where studied the diving physiology and field energetics of Harbor porpoise.

McDonald joined MLML and San Jose State University as an assistant professor in 2015 and is currently an associate professor. She leads MLML 's Vertebrate Ecology Lab's research projects focused on Risso's dolphins in Monterey Bay, Emperor penguin movement ecology and foraging behavior, and the diving physiology and energetics of California sea lion.

In 2019, McDonald led a field expedition to Antarctica, studying Emperor penguin colonies at Cape Crozier, Ross Island in collaboration with Antarctica New Zealand. Her team camped on the sea ice for four weeks, focusing on their diet, foraging strategy, and habitat of the emperor penguin to better understand their physiological limits and at-sea behaviors. This effort was one of the first time Emperor penguins were studied at Cape Crozier in detail and was the subject of a video by National Geographic called "Penguin Invasion". Using datalogging tags, McDonald and her team measured dive depth, rate of acceleration, and GPS position tracking of emperor penguins at sea. This research provides an understand how the receding ice shelf affects foraging, survival, and reproduction of penguins.

== Selected works ==
- McDonald, B. I., & Ponganis, P. J. (2012). Lung collapse in the diving sea lion: hold the nitrogen and save the oxygen. Biology letters, 8(6), 1047-1049.
- McDonald, B. I., Goebel, M. E., Crocker, D. E., & Costa, D. P. (2012). Biological and environmental drivers of energy allocation in a dependent mammal, the Antarctic fur seal pup. Physiological and Biochemical Zoology, 85(2), 134-147.
- Maxwell SM, Hazen EL, Bograd SJ, Halpern BS, Breed GA, Nickel B, Teutschel NM, Crowder LB, Benson S, Dutton PH, et al. Cumulative human impacts on marine predators. Nature Communications. 2013;4(1):2688. doi:10.1038/ncomms3688
- McDonald, B. I., Johnson, M., & Madsen, P. T. (2018). Dive heart rate in harbour porpoises is influenced by exercise and expectations. Journal of Experimental Biology, 221(1), jeb168740.
- Hindell MA, Reisinger RR, Ropert-Coudert Y, Hückstädt LA, Trathan PN, Bornemann H, Charrassin J-B, Chown SL, Costa DP, Danis B, et al. Tracking of marine predators to protect Southern Ocean ecosystems. Nature. 2020;580(7801):87–92. doi:10.1038/s41586-020-2126-y
