= Digital magazine =

Digital magazine may refer to:

- Online magazine
- Electronic journal
- Digital edition of a print magazine
