= Sara Iverson =

American biologist

- Education: Duke University
- Awards: Fellow of the Royal Society of Canada, Life Sciences Division, Academy of Science
- Scientific career
- Fields: animal physiological and biochemical mechanism, biology and ecology of marine vertebrates, marine animal tagging and tracking

Sara Iverson is a professor emeritus of biology at Dalhousie University, and formerly the scientific director of the Ocean Tracking Network (OTN).

Iverson was selected by Mattel Inc. and National Geographic as an influential Canadian scientist and role model for Barbie's You Can Be Anything campaign as part of the doll's 60th anniversary. This effort is aimed at helping young girls can have a career in a scientific fields where women have historically been underrepresented.

== Early life and education ==
Iverson was born in Royal Oak, Michigan. She has a bachelors of science in Zoology from Duke University, 1979. She received her Ph.D. in 1988 from the University of Maryland, College Park MD in Nutritional Sciences. She began her career as a Graduate Research Fellow, Max-Planck Institute for Behavioral Physiology, Wuppertal, West Germany. She held teaching positions and research positions at University of Maryland, Oregon State University, Smithsonian Institution, Washington DC, Georgetown University Medical Center, Washington DC; Technical University of Nova Scotia, Halifax, NS. Iverson joined the Department of Biology, Dalhousie University, in 1994 as an Assistant Professor and rose to her current position as Professor in 2004. Iverson was the founding Scientific Director of the Ocean Tracking Network based at Dalhousie University, Halifax, Nova Scotia starting in 2008 until 2024; she currently serves as a Science Advisor to the Ocean Tracking Network. She is also a professor of biology in Affiliate Professor, Institute of Marine Science, School of Fisheries and Ocean Sciences, University of Alaska Fairbanks.

== Career and research ==
Iverson's research interests are focused on how animals adapt to and exploit their environments and in the physiological and biochemical mechanisms which constrain or provide opportunities for them to do so. Her research program is inter-disciplinary, combining comparative physiology and ecology with lipid biochemistry and metabolism in vertebrates, and integrating laboratory and field studies on fundamental issues of interest to both zoological and medical communities, and which also have implications for the conservation and management of mammal, seabird, and fish populations. Iverson supervises and mentors a number of graduate students both as a Professor and through her leadership within OTN.

== Honors and awards ==
- Fellow of the Royal Society of Canada, Life Sciences Division, Academy of Science, 2018 – present
- (As leader of OTN), Nature Inspiration Award to OTN (Not-for-Profit Large category), Canadian Museum of Nature, November 2016
- (As leader of OTN) International Conservation Achievement Award to OTN, American Fisheries Society, July 2016
- University Research Professor, distinction in scholarship, Dalhousie University, Halifax, NS, 2009–2014.
- Faculty of Science Killam Prize, Dalhousie University, Halifax, NS. 2000.
- NSERC E.W.R. Steacie Memorial Fellowship July 1998 – June 2000.

== Selected publications ==
- Landovskis, S., Bailey, M., Iverson, S., Jeddore, S., Lennox, R.J., Murray, C. and Whoriskey, F., 2024. Habitat and movement selection processes of American lobster/jakej within a restricted bay in the Bras d'Or Lake/Pitu'paq, Nova Scotia, Canada. Movement Ecology, 12(1), p.48.
- Lennox, R.J., Whoriskey, F.G., Verhelst, P., Vandergoot, C.S., Soria, M., Reubens, J., Rechisky, E.L., Power, M., Murray, T., Mulder, I. and Markham, J.L., Lowerre-Barbieri, S.K., Lindley, S.T., Knott, N.A., Kessel, S.T., Iverson, S., Huveneers, C., Heidemeyer, M., Harcourt. R., Griffin, L.P., Friess, C., Filous, A., Fetterplace, L.C., Danylchuk, A.J., Daly, R., Cowley, P., Cooke, S.J., Chávez, E.J., Blaison, A., Whoriskey, K. (2024). Globally coordinated acoustic aquatic animal tracking reveals unexpected, ecologically important movements across oceans, lakes and rivers. Ecography, 2024(1), p.e06801.
- Remili, A., Dietz, R., Sonne, C., Iverson, S.J., Roy, D., Rosing-Asvid, A., Land-Miller, H., Pedersen, A.F. and McKinney, M.A., 2022. Validation of quantitative fatty acid signature analysis for estimating the diet composition of free-ranging killer whales. Scientific Reports, 12(1), p.7938.
- Cooke, S.J., Lennox, R.J., Brownscombe, J.W., Iverson, S.J., Whoriskey, F.G., Millspaugh, J.J., Hussey, N.E., Crossin, G.T., Godley, B.J. and Harcourt, R., 2021. A case for restoring unity between biotelemetry and bio-logging to enhance animal tracking research. Facets, 6(1), pp.1260-1265.
- Jay, C.V., Iverson, S.J. and Fischbach, A.S., 2021. Variability of lipids and fatty acids in Pacific walrus blubber. Frontiers in Marine Science, 8, p.603065.
- Jory, Cabrol, Véronique Lesage, Alexandra Leclerc, Janie Giard, Sara Iverson, Martine Bérubé, Robert Michaud, and Christian Nozais. "Individual and population dietary specialization decline in fin whales during a period of ecosystem shift." Scientific reports 11, no. 1 (2021): 17181.
- Brownscombe, J.W., Griffin, L.P., Chapman, J.M., Morley, D., Acosta, A., Crossin, G.T., Iverson, S.J., Adams, A.J., Cooke, S.J. and Danylchuk, A.J., 2020. A practical method to account for variation in detection range in acoustic telemetry arrays to accurately quantify the spatial ecology of aquatic animals. Methods in Ecology and Evolution, 11(1), pp.82-94.
- Brownscombe, J.W., Griffin, L.P., Morley, D., Acosta, A., Hunt, J., Lowerre‐Barbieri, S.K., Crossin, G.T., Iverson, S.J., Boucek, R., Adams, A.J. and Cooke, S.J., 2020. Seasonal occupancy and connectivity amongst nearshore flats and reef habitats by permit Trachinotus falcatus: considerations for fisheries management. Journal of Fish Biology, 96(2), pp.469-479.
- Nowak, B.V.R., Bowen, W.D., Lidgard, D.C. and Iverson, S.J., 2020. Grey seals (Halichoerus grypus) as bioprobes: Fine-scale measurements of oceanographic properties using an instrumented large marine predator. Progress in Oceanography, 189, p.102453.
- Lidgard, D.C., Bowen, W.D. and Iverson, S.J., 2020. Sex-differences in fine-scale home-range use in an upper-trophic level marine predator. Movement Ecology, 8, pp.1-16.
- Iverson, Sara J., Aaron T. Fisk, Scott G. Hinch, Joanna Mills Flemming, Steven J. Cooke, and Frederick G. Whoriskey. "The Ocean Tracking Network: Advancing frontiers in aquatic science and management." Canadian Journal of Fisheries and Aquatic Sciences 76, no. 7 (2019): 1041-1051.
- Harcourt, Rob, Ana MM Sequeira, Xuelei Zhang, Fabien Roquet, Kosei Komatsu, Michelle Heupel, Clive McMahon et al. (including Sara Iverson) "Animal-borne telemetry: an integral component of the ocean observing toolkit." Frontiers in Marine Science 6 (2019): 326.
- Studholme, K.R., Hipfner, J.M., Domalik, A.D., Iverson, S.J. and Crossin, G.T., 2019. Year-round tracking reveals multiple migratory tactics in a sentinel North Pacific seabird, Cassin's auklet. Marine Ecology Progress Series, 619, pp.169-185.
- Bourque, Jennifer, Rune Dietz, Christian Sonne, Judy St Leger, Sara Iverson, Aqqalu Rosing-Asvid, Martin Hansen, and Melissa A. McKinney. "Feeding habits of a new Arctic predator: insight from full-depth blubber fatty acid signatures of Greenland, Faroe Islands, Denmark, and managed-care killer whales Orcinus orca." Marine Ecology Progress Series 603 (2018): 1-12.
- Hussey, N.E., Kessel, S.T., Aarestrup, K., Cooke, S.J., Cowley, P.D., Fisk, A.T., Harcourt, R.G., Holland, K.N., Iverson, S.J., Kocik, J.F. and Mills Flemming, J.E., 2015. Aquatic animal telemetry: a panoramic window into the underwater world. Science, 348(6240), p.1255642.
