= DOS Power Tools =

1988 book

DOS Power Tools: Techniques, Tricks and Utilities
- Cover of first edition
- Author: Paul Somerson
- Language: English
- Subject: MS-DOS tips and tricks
- Genre: Non-fiction
- Publisher: Bantam Books
- Publication date: 1988
- Publication place: United States
- Pages: 1272 pages (1st ed.); 1054 pages (5.0 ed.)
- ISBN: 9780553347012

DOS Power Tools: Techniques, Tricks and Utilities is a book by Paul Somerson, first published in 1988 by Bantam Books and sponsored by PC Magazine. The book offers a guide to approaching MS-DOS (and its cousin PC DOS) as well as various tricks and utility programs—the latter provided as x86 assembly source code listings and as compiled .COM and .EXE executables on an accompanying floppy disk (later expanded to three disks). The book was a best-seller and received positive critical reception.

The first edition of the book was written to accompany versions of DOS from 2.0 through 3.3. The book was revised in 1992 to support version 5.0.

== Contents ==
The first edition of DOS Power Tools is divided into five parts. The first part, "Getting Up to Speed", comprises six chapters discussing the background and development of DOS; the basic principles of DOS and its interactions with hard drives; an introduction to binary and hexadecimal encoding and x86 instructions; PC keyboard scan codes; and the basics of CPUs, ROM and RAM. The second part, "The DOS Tools", describes two programs included with DOS—EDLIN.COM, the line editor, and DEBUG.COM, the assembler/debugger—as well as various .SYS files. The third part, "Power User Secrets", defines batch files and their various syntax; DOS environment variables; ANSI color codes; EGA video modes; the rest of the programs included with DOS versions 2.0 through 3.3, such as GRAPHICS.COM, XCOPY and FDISK; and concludes with a troubleshooting guide in case the PC crashes. The fourth part, "The Utilities DOS Forgot", is a compendium of source code listings for various bespoke programs and utilities, written in x86 assembly and in GW-BASIC. The fifth and final part, "Quick Reference", provides a glossary of the primary DOS commands and their flags; CONFIG.SYS directives; batch file syntax; and comprehensive glossaries for EDLIN, DEBUG, and ANSI.SYS.

== Sales and reception ==
DOS Power Tools was a hot-seller for Bantam Books' Computer Books imprint, with between 385,000 and 400,000 copies having been sold by summer 1990. The book came amid a resurgence of computer-related reference works in the late 1980s, following a bottoming-out of the market in the mid-1980s. The book eventually sold roughly one million copies.

Computers in Libraries writer and OCLC employee Randy Dykhuis called the first edition a "mammoth book ... $40, including a disk, and it's worth it". He continued: "I can't recommend this book highly enough. I think it belongs on or near the desk of anyone who wants to get everything possible from their PC." Publishers Weekly called the DOS 5.0 edition an "excellent guide" for "intermediate and advanced users", with Somerson writing in a "friendly, lively style, providing enlightening, albeit sometimes redundant, coverage of a wide range of meaty DOS topics with numerous hands-on examples". The magazine held reservation with its coverage of the DOS 5.0–specific commands compared to older ones and found the index "unusable" but concluded that "the book remains one of the best of its kind".
