= PCMag =

Computer magazine

PC Magazine

- Cover of September 2011 issue of the digital edition
- Editor: Wendy Sheehan Donnell
- Former editors: Dan Costa; Lance Ulanoff; Jim Louderback; Michael J. Miller; Bill Machrone; David Bunnell
- Categories: Computer magazine
- First issue: February/March 1982; 44 years ago (as PC)
- Final issue: January 2009 (print); December 2022 (digital edition)
- Company: PCMag Digital Group (Ziff Davis)
- Country: United States
- Based in: New York
- Language: English
- Website: www.pcmag.com
- ISSN: 0888-8507 (print); 2373-2830 (web)
- OCLC: 960872918

PCMag (previously PC Magazine) is an American computer magazine published by Ziff Davis. A print edition was published from 1982 to January 2009; a digital edition, with monthly issues and print-like formatting, was published from late 1994 to December 2022. Its website continues to operate, with articles posted on a rolling basis.

== Overview ==
PCMag provides reviews and previews of the latest hardware and software for the information technology professional. During its print era, other regular departments included columns by long-time editor-in-chief Michael J. Miller ("Forward Thinking"), Bill Machrone, and Jim Louderback, as well as:

- "First Looks" (a collection of reviews of newly released products)
- "Pipeline" (a collection of short articles and snippets on computer-industry developments)
- "Solutions" (which includes various how-to articles)
- "User-to-User" (a section in which the magazine's experts answer user-submitted questions)
- "After Hours" (a section about various computer entertainment products; the designation "After Hours" is a legacy of the magazine's traditional orientation towards business computing.)
- "Abort, Retry, Fail?" (a beginning-of-the-magazine humor page which for a few years was known as "Backspace"—and was subsequently the last page).

For several years in the 1980s, PC Magazine gave significant coverage to programming for the IBM PC and compatibles in languages such as Turbo Pascal, BASIC, Assembly and C. Charles Petzold was one of the notable writers on programming topics.

Editor Bill Machrone wrote in 1985, that If an article doesn't evaluate products or enhance productivity, "chances are it doesn't belong in PC Magazine".

== History ==
Official logo prior to April 2024

In an early review of the new IBM PC, Byte reported that PC: The Independent Guide to the IBM Personal Computer "should be of great interest to owners". The first issue of PC, dated February–March 1982, appeared early that year. (The magazine was at first advertised as PC Guide. The word Magazine was added to the name with the third issue in June 1982, but not added to the logo until January 1986.)

PC Magazine was created by David Bunnell, Jim Edlin, and Cheryl Woodard (who also helped Bunnell found the subsequent PC World and Macworld magazines). David Bunnell, Edward Currie and Tony Gold were the magazines co-founders. Bunnell and Currie created the magazine's business plan at Lifeboat Associates in New York which included, in addition to PC Magazine, explicit plans for publication of PC Tech, PC Week (now eWeek), and PC Expositions (PC Expo), all of which were subsequently realized. Tony Gold, a co-founder of Lifeboat Associates financed the magazine in the early stages. The magazine grew beyond the capital required to publish it; to solve this problem, Gold sold the magazine to Ziff-Davis, moving from California to New York City. By February 1983 it was published by PC Communications Corp., a subsidiary of Ziff-Davis Publishing Co., Bunnell and his staff left to form PC World magazine. The first issue of PC carried an interview with Bill Gates, made possible by his friendship with David Bunnell, who was among the first journalists and writers to take an interest in personal computing.

=== Early transition to square binding ===
By its third issue PC was square-bound, because it was too thick for saddle-stitch. At first the magazine published new issues every two months, but became monthly as of the August 1982 issue, its fourth. In March 1983 a reader urged the magazine to consider switching to a biweekly schedule because of its thickness. Although the magazine replied to the reader's proposal with "Please say you're kidding about the bi-weekly schedule. Please?", after the December 1983 issue reached 800 pages in size, as of the 17 January 1984 issue PC began publishing new issues every two weeks, each about 400 pages in size. In January 2008 the magazine dropped back to monthly issues. Print circulation peaked at 1.2 million in the late 1990s. In November 2008, it was announced that the print edition would be discontinued as of the January 2009 issue, but the online version at pcmag.com would continue. By this time, print circulation had declined to about 600,000. In the December 2022 issue, it was announced that the issue was the last one following the magazine format, and focus was shifted to the pcmag.com website.

The magazine had no ISSN until 1983, when it was assigned ISSN 0745-2500, which was later changed to ISSN 0888-8507.

PC Magazine uses Google Books as the official archive of its 27 years as a print publication.

PC Magazine is not to be confused with the earlier magazine named Personal Computing (also called Personal Computing – The Magazine), published by Hayden Publishing, which had a publication period spanning from January/February 1977 to approximately 1986.

== Editorial leadership ==
Wendy Sheehan Donnell was appointed editor-in-chief of PCMag.com in January 2022. Donnell had been deputy editor and joined PCMag.com as a senior editor covering consumer electronics in 2007.

As of January 2025, Donnell remained as editor-in-chief and John Burek was PC Labs Director and executive editor. Alex Colon was executive editor.

=== Editorial leadership history ===
Prior to Donnell's appointment, Dan Costa was editor-in-chief from August 2011 to December 2021. Lance Ulanoff held the position of editor-in-chief from July 2007 to July 2011. Jim Louderback was editor-in-chief before Ulanoff, from 2005, and left to become chief executive officer of online media company Revision3.

Editor-in-chief	Start	End
Wendy Sheehan Donnell	January 2022	
Dan Costa	August 2011	December 2021
Lance Ulanoff	July 2007	July 2011
Jim Louderback	2005	2007

== Development and evolution ==
The magazine evolved significantly over the years. The most drastic change was the shrinkage of the publication due to contractions in the computer-industry's ad market and the easy availability of the Internet, which made computer magazines seem less necessary. This is also the primary reason for the November 2008 decision to discontinue the print version.

It has adapted to the new realities of the 21st century by reducing its once-standard emphasis on massive comparative reviews of computer systems, hardware peripherals, and software packages to focus more on the broader consumer-electronics market. From the late 1990s, the magazine more frequently reviewed Macintosh software and hardware.

As of February 2025, PCMag.com has multiple categories of coverage, including reviews, how-to articles, news, opinion, deals, PCs & hardware, mobile, electronics, smart home, health & fitness, gaming, software & services, and security. The magazine also produces product comparisons. It also releases special issues like "Get Organized" and an annual Best Tech Brands ranking.

=== The creation of a hardware test facility ===
PC Magazine was one of the first publications to have a formal test facility, which they called PC Labs. The name was used early in the magazine, and a physical PC Labs was built at the magazine's 1 Park Avenue, New York facility in 1986. William Wong was the first PC Labs Director. PC Labs created a series of benchmarks, of which older versions can be found on the internet. PC Labs was designed to help writers and editors evaluate PC hardware and software, especially for large projects like the annual printer edition where almost a hundred printers were compared using PC Labs printer benchmarks.

== See also ==
- DOS Power Tools, sponsored by PC Magazine
- PC Magazine (British magazine) - UK edition, which was under separate ownership for a time
