= Quetin Head =

Rock headland in Ross Dependency, Antarctica

Quetin Head (73°06′00″S 169°26′00″E) is a rock headland 3.5 nautical miles (6.5 km) southwest of Cape Phillips, Daniell Peninsula, Borchgrevink Coast. The headland rises to 900 m and marks the eastern extent of Mandible Cirque. Named by the Advisory Committee on Antarctic Names in 2005 after Langdon B. Quetin and Robin Macurda Ross-Quetin, Marine Science Institute, University of California, Santa Barbara, collaborators in United States Antarctic Program ecological research in the Southern Ocean for 14 field seasons, from 1991 to 2004.
