= Dan Costa (scientist) =

American ecologist and physiologist

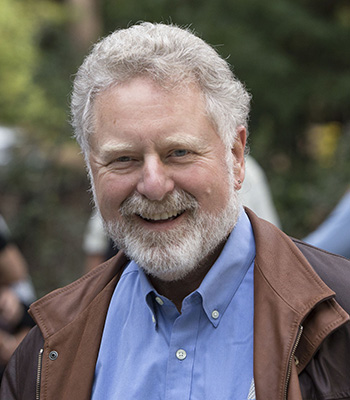
- Education: University of California, Los Angeles (B.S. Zoology) University of California, Santa Cruz (Ph.D Biology) Scripps Institute of Oceanography (Postdoctoral)
- Website: https://costa.eeb.ucsc.edu

Daniel "Dan" Costa is a pinniped ecologist and physiologist. He is a distinguished professor at the University of California, Santa Cruz that works primarily at Año Nuevo State Reserve in Pescadero, California and McMurdo Sound in Antarctica. He was involved in the early development of biotelemetry instruments used to track diving depths and migration patterns of several pinniped species. He is the principal investigator of the Strategic Environmental Research and Development Program (SERDP) and the co-sponsor of the completed Tagging of Pacific Predators and ongoing Monterey Bay White Sharks projects.

== Early life and education ==
Daniel Costa was born in Los Angeles, California. Costa began his academic career at the University of California, Los Angeles from 1970 to 1974 where he received his Bachelor of Science in zoology. He then received his Ph.D. in biology from U.C. Santa Cruz in 1978 and completed his postdoctoral work at Scripps Institute of Oceanography at the University of California, San Diego. Costa currently works as a Distinguished Professor of Ecology and Evolutionary Biology at U.C. Santa Cruz, acting as the principal investigator for the Costa Lab where he focuses on the ecophysiology of pinnipeds.

== Career and impact ==
=== Early career ===
Costa began his career studying the sea otter. His doctoral thesis at U.C. Santa Cruz analyzed the metabolic intake rates of the sea otter via seawater consumption, and was accepted on June 16, 1981. Shortly thereafter, "The sea otter: its interaction with man," was published through Scripps in 1978 and detailed the species' history with anthropogenic stressors, their kelp forest foraging ecology, and future considerations in terms of fisheries management. Costa continued his work with sea otters until his most recent publication on the species in 2011.

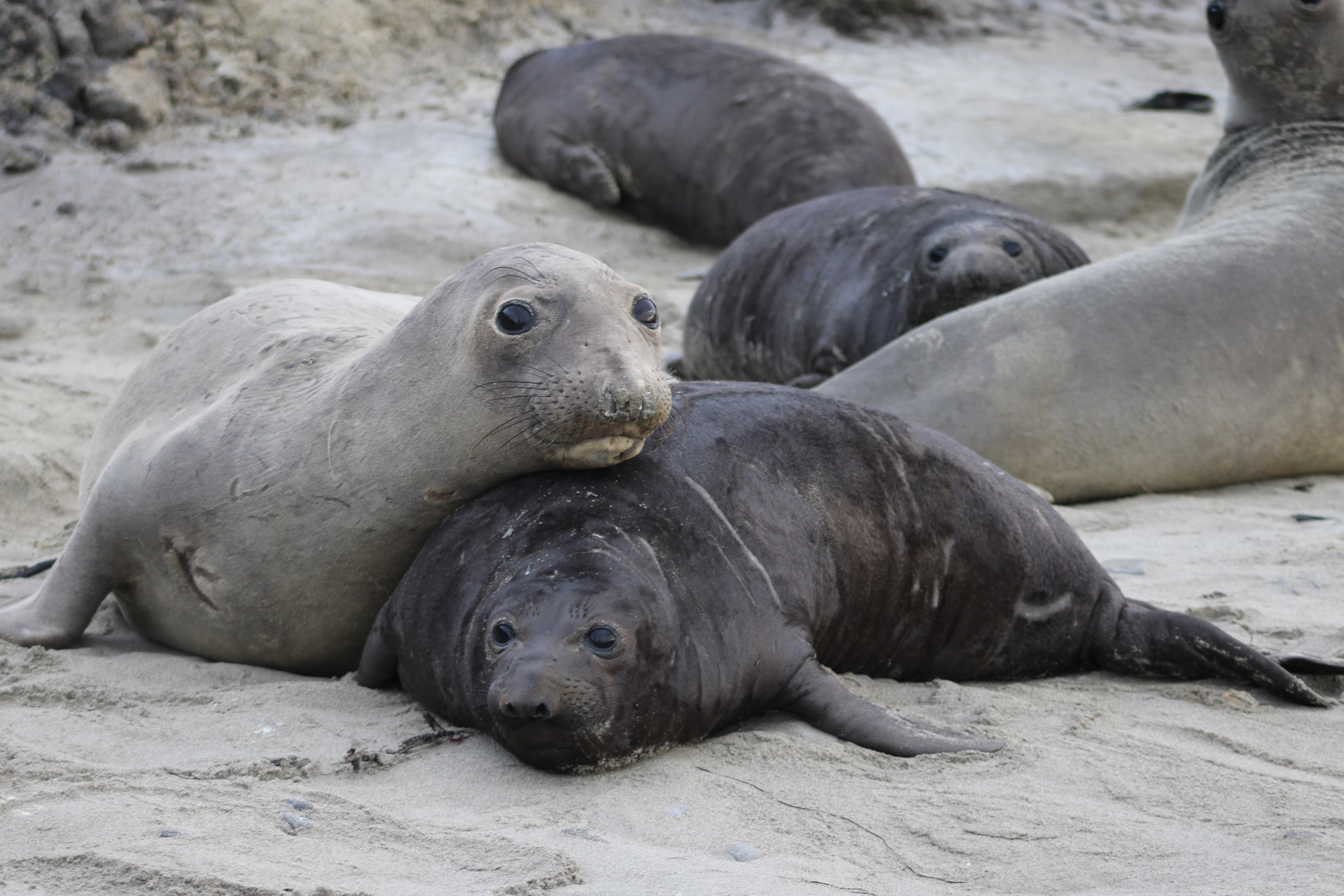
Northern elephant seals at Año Nuevo State Reserve

=== Research at Año Nuevo State Reserve ===
Following his work on sea otters, Costa began studying northern elephant seals and conducting research primarily at Año Nuevo State Reserve. He worked closely with Bernard "Burney" J. LeBœuf, a professor emeritus at U.C. Santa Cruz's Institute of Marine Studies, and Daniel Crocker, a professor focusing on pinniped physiology at Sonoma State University. His main research goals were to understand the reproductive energetics, physiology, and behavioral ecology of the species. Costa has been involved with the northern elephant seals' Año Nuevo colony for over thirty years. Using data systematically collected over decades by students and faculty of U.C. Santa Cruz, several projects have been completed which analyze migration patterns and potential responses to stress caused by predator interactions. Currently, Costa has published over 140 papers pertaining to northern elephant seals, with 35 specifically at Año Nuevo, with publications ranging from January 1988 to December 2025.

=== Research in Antarctica ===
Costa worked as a chief scientist on board the Nathaniel B. Palmer vessel in 2001 and 2002 as part of the U.S. Global Ecosystem Dynamics (U.S. GLOBEC) project, integrating and analyzing datasets gathered from several Antarctic organisms. In 2005, the Advisory Committee on Antarctic Names designated the Costa Spur to be named after him following his involvement in the 2001 and 2002 U.S. GLOBEC projects.

Costa has lead several projects studying Antarctic pinniped species, such as the southern elephant seal, in which he studies their extreme diving capabilities and physiological adaptations allowing them to survive in frigid waters and at highly pressurized depths. He co-authored an article studying the diving depths of southern elephant seals and other pinnipeds in the Antarctic utilizing newly developed instruments meant to track time and depth, discovering that their dives range from 600 to 1800 meters. Costa's biotelemetry projects have assisted Antarctic researchers in studying the sea ice conditions and current patterns of the Southern Ocean through the use of tagged pinnipeds.

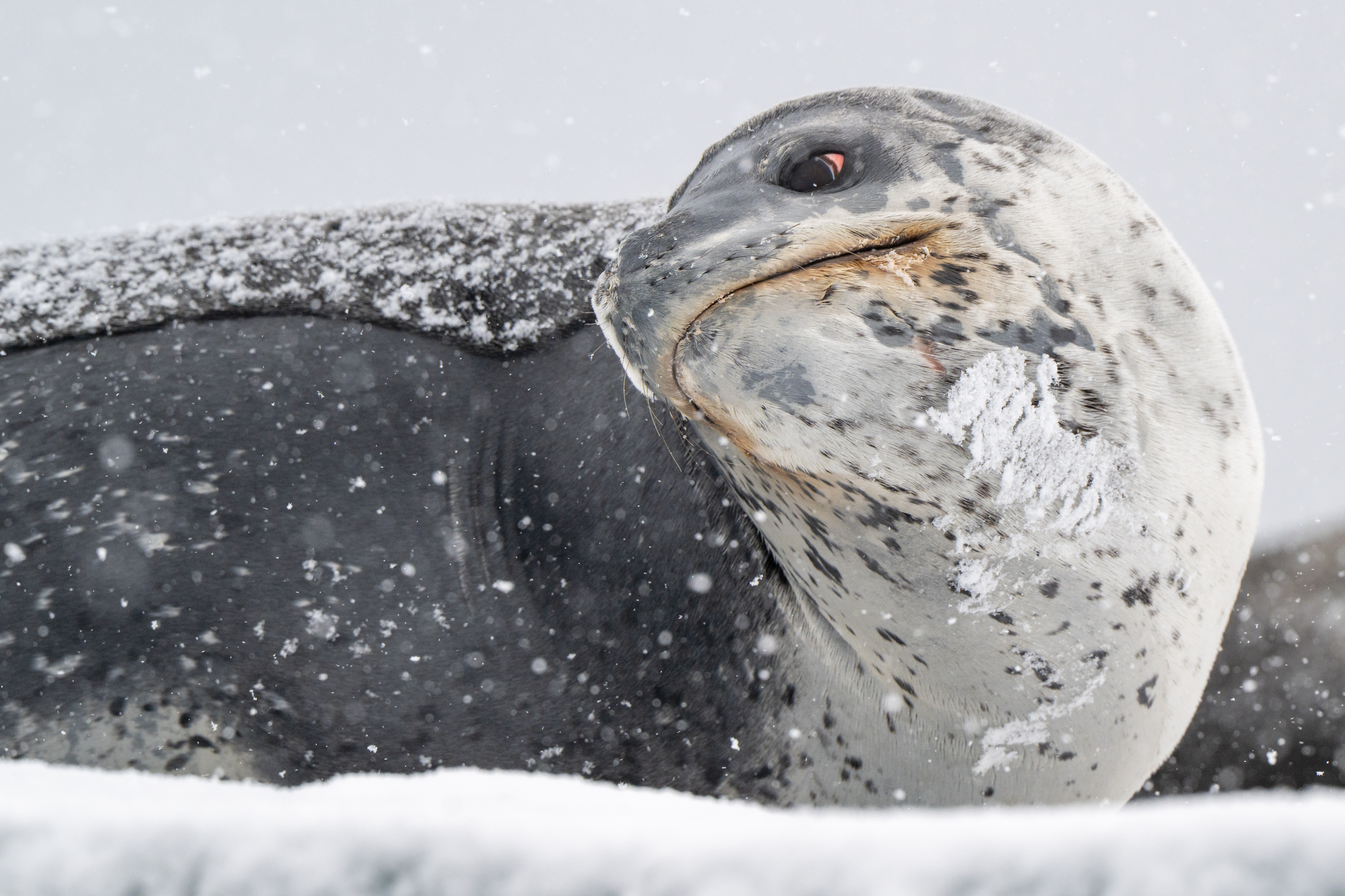
Leopard seal in the Antarctic

In addition to studies involving the southern elephant seal, Costa has worked with leopard seals. In 2022, he acted as the principal investigator of a breakthrough collaboration with several institutions and organizations, including Baylor University, Colorado State University, and the NOAA's Antarctic Ecosystem Research Division. During the study 22 leopard seals were tagged and monitored off the coast of the Western Antarctic Peninsula. Results from the study included observations of sexual dimorphism within the species, with females being around 1.5 times larger than males on average and spending more time hauled out on land, and an increased understanding of their diving physiology with shallower diving ranges being reported as opposed to other Antarctic seals' depths.

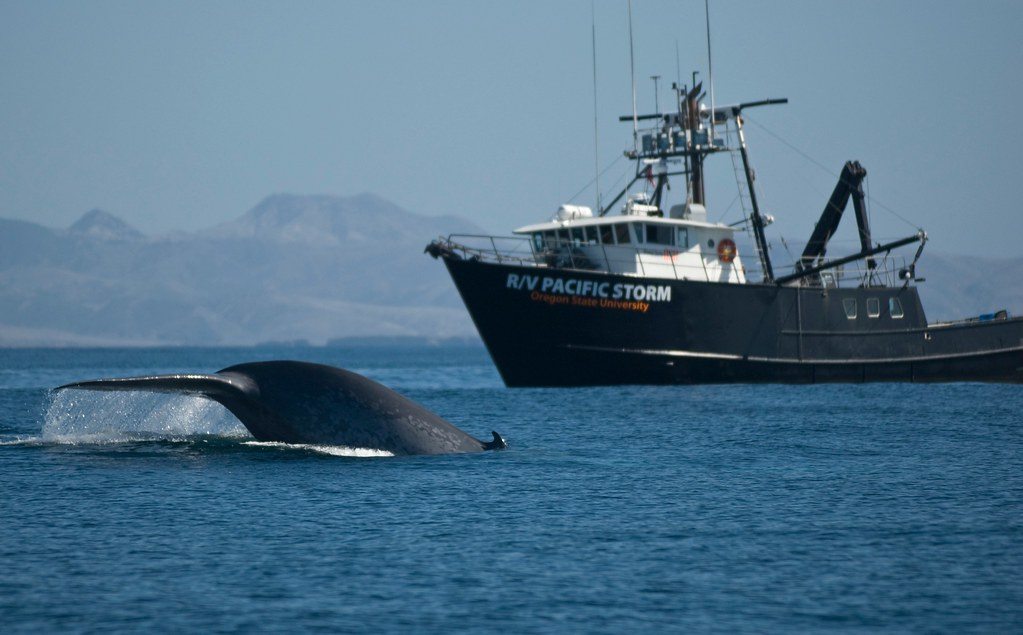
Vessel participating in the TOPP program in 2007

=== Tagging of Pacific Predators (TOPP) ===
Dan Costa co-founded TOPP alongside Dr. Barbara Block of Stanford University's Hopkins Marine Station, which collected data from several large marine vertebrates from 2000 to 2016. The project was a part of the Census of Marine Life's 17-project endeavor and was composed of marine biologists, oceanographers, and other interdisciplinary researchers from eight countries. It utilized data loggers and archival tags to track the migration patterns of 23 pelagic marine predator species. Costa was the lead for the pinnipeds section of the project and additionally worked with data from cetaceans, seabirds, and sea turtles. In total, 4,306 electronic tags were deployed for the program, resulting in 1,791 migratory trajectories and 265,386 total days’ worth of data.

=== Additional projects ===
Costa also began a collaborative study alongside the University of St. Andrews on the effects of multiple intrinsic and extrinsic stressors on marine mammals in 2021, assessing the impacts of life-history events and environmental influences on organisms using the population of northern elephant seals at Año Nuevo State Reserve as a study system, titled Strategic Environmental Research and Development Program (SERDP). Costa has additionally co-led the Monterey Bay White Sharks project with Hopkins Marine Station, the University of Washington, and the Middlebury Institute of International Studies since 2023, with an emphasis on predation patterns regarding California sea lions and their effects on white shark populations near Año Nuevo Island.

== Awards and acknowledgements ==
- Chief Scientist, Global Ocean Ecosystem Dynamics
- U.S. representative, Scientific Committee on Oceanic Research
- Committee member, National Academies Ocean Studies Board
- 1970 Bausch and Lomb Science Award
- 2002-06 Secretary, Society for Marine Mammalogy
- 2008 Eminent Scholars lecturer, University of South Florida
- 2008-13 Ida Benson Endowed Chair of Ocean Health
- 2021 workshop facilitator, 'Technology Developments to Advance Antarctic Research
- 2021-22 Division of Physical and Biological Sciences Outstanding Faculty Award
- 2024 Ed Ricketts Memorial Award
- 2024 Lifetime Fellow of the Ecological Society of America
- 2024 California Academy of Sciences Fellows Award

== Selected publications ==
- Costa, Daniel. (1993). The relationship between reproductive and foraging energetics and the evolution of the Pinnipedia. Symposium for the Zoological Society of London. 66. 293–314.
- Block, Barbara & Jonsen, Ian & Jorgensen, Salvador & Winship, Arliss & Shaffer, Scott & Bograd, Steven & Hazen, Elliott & Foley, D & Breed, G.A. & Harrison, Autumn-Lynn & Ganong, James & Swithenbank, Alan & Castleton, Michael & Mate, B & Shillinger, George & Schaefer, K & Benson, Scott & Weise, Michael & Costa, Daniel. (2011). Tracking apex marine predator movements in a dynamic ocean. Nature. 475. 86–90. 10.1038/nature10082.
- Costa, Daniel & Holser, Rachel & McDonald, Birgette & Peterson, Sarah & Ackerman, Joshua & Crocker, Daniel. (2025). T he population consequences of multiple stressors: Acoustic disturbance, pollutant load, physiological stress, and environmental variability on elephant seals. The Journal of the Acoustical Society of America. 158. A424-A424. 10.1121/10.0041376.
- Costa, Daniel & Holser, Rachel & Keates, Theresa & Adachi, Taiki & Beltran, Roxanne & Champagne, Cory & Crocker, Daniel & Favilla, Arina & Fowler, Melinda & Gallo-Reynoso, J.P. & Goetsch, Chandra & Hassrick, Jason & Hückstädt, Luis & Kendall-Bar, Jessica & Kienle, Sarah & Kuhn, Carey & Maresh, Jennifer & Maxwell, Sara & Mcdonald, Birgitte & Yoda, Ken. (2024). Two decades of three-dimensional movement data from adult female northern elephant seals. Scientific Data. 11. 1357. 10.1038/s41597-024-04084-4.
