= Dan Costa (journalist) =

American journalist

- Occupations: Editor, journalist
- Known for: PC Magazine

Dan Costa is an American journalist. he is the current Chief Content Officer at Worth Media Group. He was the editor-in-chief of PC Magazine and the SVP of Content for Ziff Davis, which includes Geek.com, Extreme.com and ComputerShopper.com.

== Biography ==
He works in PC Labs. Although primarily a writer, he also tweets, photographs, broadcasts (NBC, CNBC, CNN, Fox), presents, consults, and cooks.

== Speaker and author ==
Dan makes frequent appearances on local, national, and international news programs, including CNN, MSNBC, FOX, ABC, NBC, and Al Jazeera America where he shares his perspective on a variety of technology trends. He also speaks at a number of private events for Fortune 500 clients. Dan does a weekly segment on iHeart Media's Rover's Morning Glory called Tech Tuesday.

He has edited two books: The Home Office Computing Handbook (McGraw-Hill, 1994) and In the Shadow of the Towers (iUniverse, 2002).
