= Pacific Ocean Shelf Tracking Project =

Field project of the Census of Marine Life

- Abbreviation: POST
- Established: 2002
- Headquarters: Vancouver Aquarium
- Website: coml.org

The Pacific Ocean Shelf Tracking Project (POST) is a field project of the Census of Marine Life that researches the behavior of marine animals through the use of ocean telemetry and data management systems. This system of telemetry consists of highly efficient lines of acoustic receivers that create sections of the continental shelf along the coast of the Pacific Northwest. The acoustic receivers pick up signals from the tagged animals as they pass along the lines, allowing for the documentation of movement patterns. The receivers also allow for the estimation of parameters such as swimming speed and mortality. The trackers sit on the seabed of the continental shelf and in the major rivers of the world. This method can be used to improve fishing skills and management.

The program started in 2002 and was initially limited to the study of the movement and ocean-survival of both hatchery-raised and wild salmon in the Pacific Northwest. After the successful pilot period, the program has now moved into the tracking of trout, sharks, rockfish, and lingcod.

== See also ==
- Ocean Tracking Network
