= Mandibular (disambiguation) =

Mandibular means "related to the mandible (lower jaw bone)". Terms containing "mandibular" include:

- Mandibular canal, a canal within the mandible that contains the inferior alveolar nerve, inferior alveolar artery, and inferior alveolar vein
- Mandibular fossa, the depression in the temporal bone that articulates with the mandibular condyle
- Mandibular nerve, the largest of the three branches of the trigeminal nerve
- Mandibular prominence, an embryological structure which gives rise to the lower portion of the face
- Torus mandibularis, a bony growth in the mandible along the surface nearest to the tongue
- Mandibula (novel), a 2018 novel by Monica Ojeda

== See also ==
- Submandibular gland
