= Digital edition =

Digitised version of magazine or newspaper

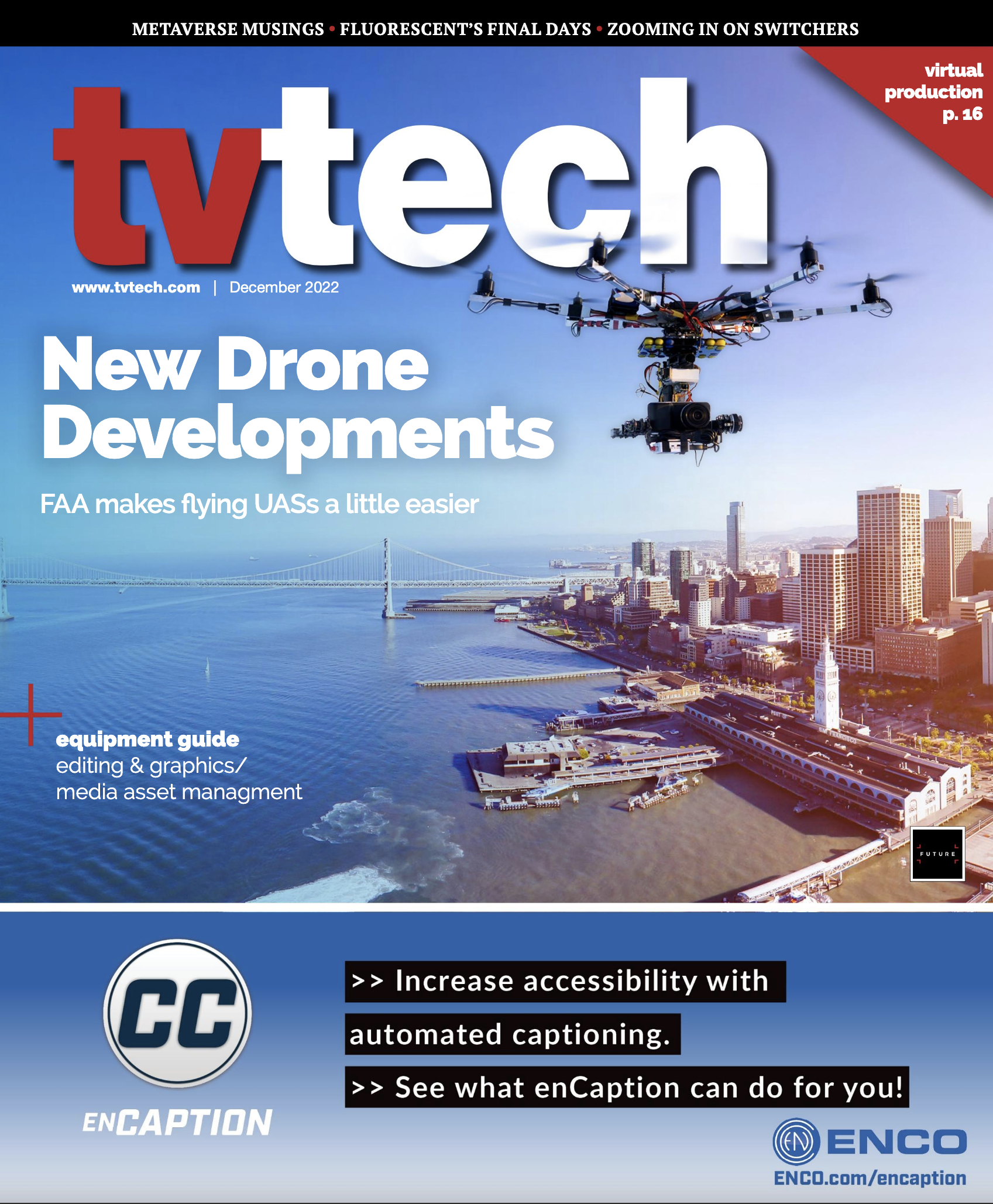
An example of digital edition cover of trade magazine TV Tech (December 2022 issue), it looks like the print version but without barcode

A digital edition is an online magazine or online newspaper delivered in electronic form which is formatted identically to the print version. Digital editions are often called digital facsimiles to underline the likeness to the print version. Digital editions have the benefit of reduced cost to the publisher and reader by avoiding the time and the expense to print and deliver paper edition. This format is considered more environmentally friendly due to the reduction of paper and energy use. These editions also often feature interactive elements such as hyperlinks both within the publication itself and to other internet resources, search option and bookmarking, and can also incorporate multimedia such as video or animation to enhance articles themselves or for advertisement purposes. Some delivery methods also include animation and sound effects that replicate turning of the page to further enhance the experience of their print counterparts. Magazine publishers have traditionally relied on two revenue sources: selling ads and selling magazines. Additionally some publishers are using other electronic publication methods such as RSS to reach out to readers and inform them when new digital editions are available.

Current technologies are generally either reader-based, requiring a download of an application and subsequent download of each edition, or browser-based, often using Macromedia Flash, requiring no application download (such as Adobe Acrobat). Some application-based readers allow users to access editions while not connected to internet. Dedicated hardware such as the Amazon Kindle and the iPad is also available for reading digital editions of select books, popular national magazines such as Time, The Atlantic, and Forbes and popular national newspapers such as the New York Times, Wall Street Journal, and Washington Post.

Archives of print newspapers, in some cases dating hundreds of years back, are being digitized and made available online. Google is indexing existing digital archives produced by the newspapers themselves or by third parties.

Newspaper and magazine archival began with microform film formats solving the problem of efficiently storing and preserving. This format, however, lacked accessibility. Many libraries, especially state libraries in the United States are archiving their collections digitally and converting existing microfilm to digital format. The Library of Congress provides project planning assistance and the National Endowment for the Humanities procures funding through grants from its National Digital Newspaper Program.

Digital magazines, ezines, e-editions and emags are sometimes referred to as digital editions, however some of these formats are published only in digital format unlike digital editions which replicate a printed edition as well.

== Digital magazines ==
Digital-replica magazines number in thousands—consumer and business publications, house magazines for associations, institutions and corporations – and conversion from print to digital was still increasing as of 2009.

A 2008 report funded by digital-replica technology providers and auditing agencies counted 1,786 digital-replica editions having more than 7 million circulation among business-to-business publications, of which 230 editions were audited The same report counted 1,470 digital-replica editions of consumer magazines having 5.5 million digital circulation, of which 240 editions were audited. These authors estimated that by year end of 2009 there would be 8,000 digital magazines, having a combined distribution of more than 30 million people.

Surveys have shown that, while not all subscribers prefer a digital edition, some do because of the environmental benefit and also because digital magazines are searchable and may easily be passed along or linked to. One such survey funded by a digital publisher reported on inputs from more than 30,000 subscribers to business, consumer and other digital magazines.

== Digital magazine business models ==
=== Reduced printing and distribution costs ===
The publishers' choice to save by moving some or all subscribers from print to digital is widely accepted. Oracle magazine, which has 176,000 of its 516,000 subscribers receiving digital according to its June 2009 BPA circulation statement, is said to be the most widely circulated digital edition of a business-to-business publication. Publishers who do this need to choose whether to make some issues all-digital, move some subscribers to digital edition, add some digital-only subscribers, or send all subscribers the digital edition.

=== Paid subscription revenue ===
In 2009, a major consumer magazine, PC Magazine, went all-digital, charging an annual subscription fee for its digital-replica edition.

Many consumer magazines and newspapers are already available in eReader formats that are sold through booksellers.

=== Sponsorship and advertising revenue ===
Digital editions often carry special "front cover" advertising, or advertising on the email message alerting the subscriber of the digital edition. Publishers also produce special digital-only inserts and rich-media ads or advertorials.

=== Designed-for-digital issues ===
Another approach is to fully replace printed issues with digital ones, or to use digital editions for extra issues that would otherwise have to be printed.
