= Mandible Cirque =

Cirque of Antarctica

Coordinates: 73°7′S 169°15′E

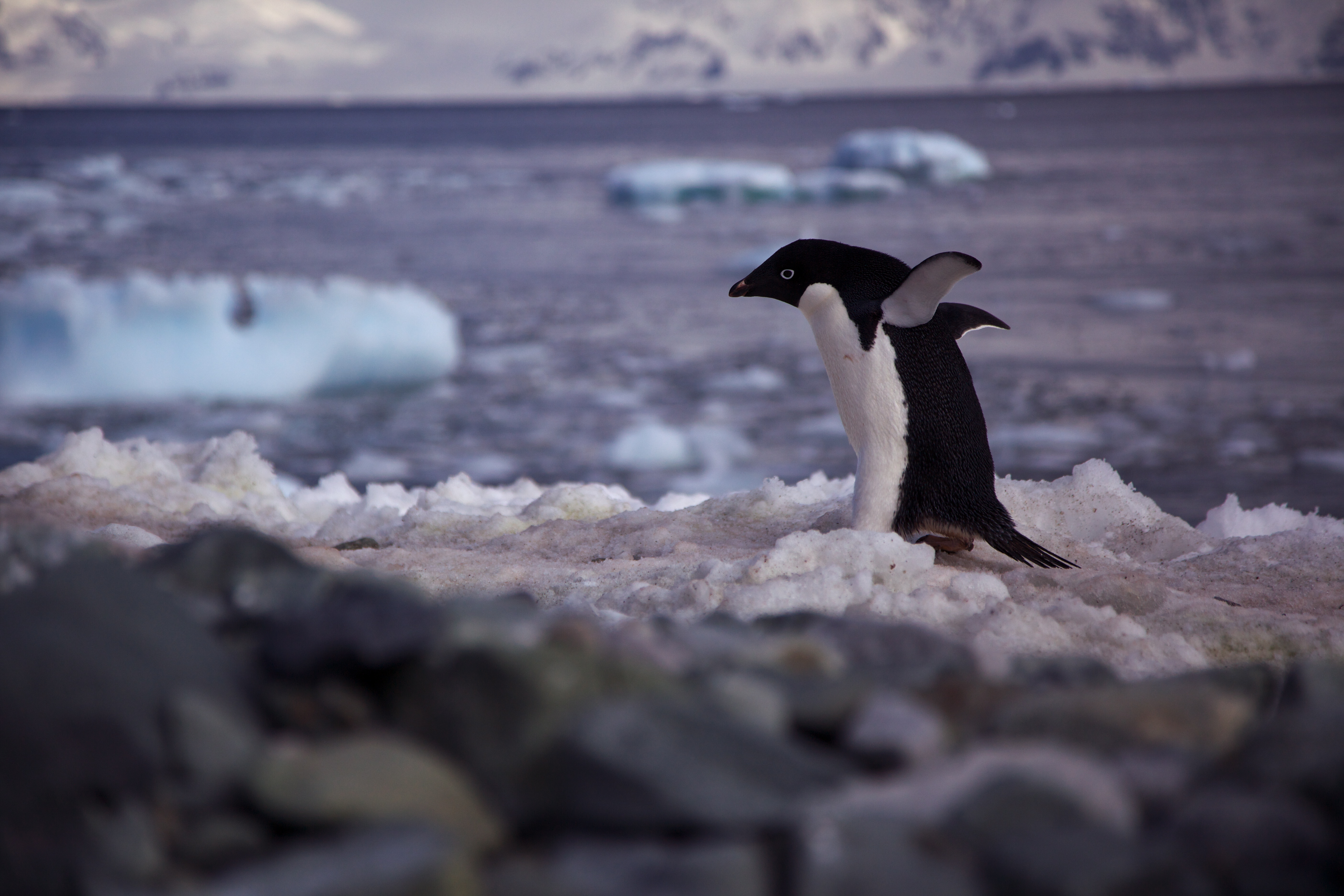
Adélie penguins breed in the IBA

Mandible Cirque is a cirque indenting the coast of Daniell Peninsula 8 km (5.0 mi) west-south-west of Cape Phillips, in Victoria Land, Antarctica. It was named in 1966 by the New Zealand Antarctic Place-Names Committee for its appearance in plan and oblique views suggestive of a mandible.

== Important Bird Area ==
A 121 ha site on ice-free land adjacent to the cirque has been designated an Important Bird Area (IBA) by BirdLife International because it supports about 17,000 breeding pairs of Adélie penguins, as estimated from reports of three seasons sampled between 1981 and 2012.
