= Tagging of Pacific Predators =

Field project by Census of Marine Life

Tagging of Pacific Predators (TOPP) began in 2000 as one of many projects formed by Census of Marine Life, an organization whose goal is to help understand and explain the diversity and abundances of the ocean in the past, present, and future. After they were formed, TOPP began by building a coalition of researchers from all over the world to find and study predators of the Pacific Ocean. Since then, they have satellite-tagged 22 different species and more than 2,000 animals. These animals include elephant seals, great white sharks, leatherback turtles, squid, albatrosses, and more.

Through the efforts of TOPP, information never before accessed by humans was now available, such as migration routes and ecosystems, but from the animals', rather than human, aspects. It also became possible to learn about the ocean itself through use of the animals, because they can go where humans cannot. We learn through their everyday actions, and through these data, researchers have been able to determine better ways of protecting endangered species, such as the leatherback turtle.

The TOPP program ended in 2010, but the research team ceased work in 2016.

== Organization ==
In addition to the NOAA's Pacific Fisheries Ecosystems Lab, Stanford's Hopkins Marine Lab, and University of California, Santa Cruz's Long Marine Laboratory, a wide range of people contribute to the success of the program, including marine biologists, oceanographers, engineers, computer programmers, journalists, graphic designers, educators and the public who provide support.

== Tagging ==
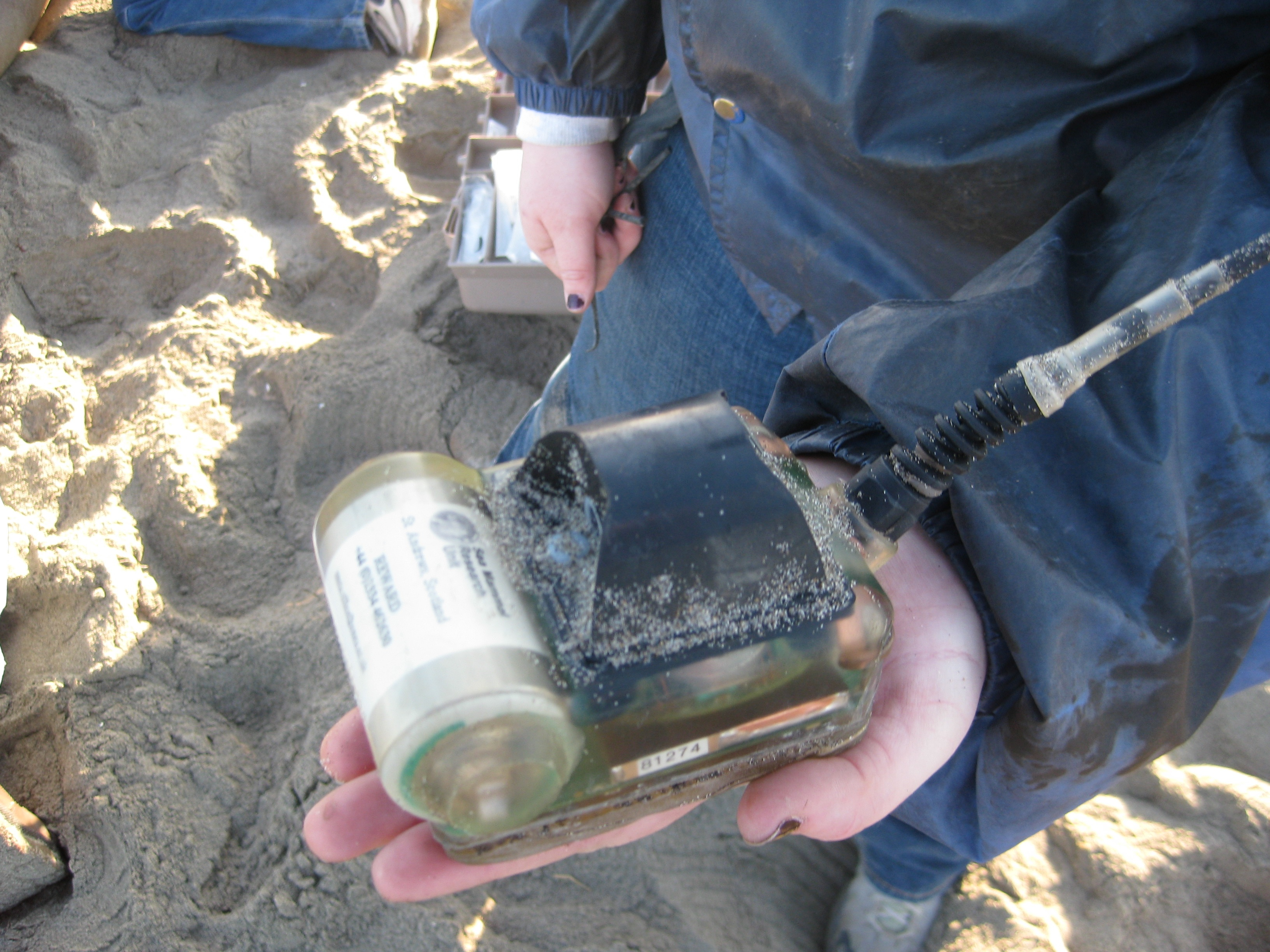
A CDT tag taken off an elephant seal at Año Nuevo State Reserve

Many different types of tags are used in the TOPP tagging program, each designed for different marine animals and different types of data. Archival tags, though small, are very powerful, and can last up to 10 years. Researchers surgically implant them into the bellies of tuna, where the tags record, as often as every few seconds, pressure (for depth of dives), ambient light (to estimate location), internal and external body temperature, and, in some cases, speed of travel. The tags are small and light enough to be attached to the outside of an animal, such as the tail feathers of red-footed boobies. However, they do have a drawback, they have to be retrieved. So, they are useful for fish likely to be caught as seafood, such as bluefin or yellowfin tuna, or animals that return to rookeries or nesting beaches, such as boobies and leatherback turtles.

Pop-up satellite archival tags (PSATs), also known simply as pop-up archival tags (PATs), are just like archival tags, except they are designed to release at a preset time, like 30 days. They then float to the surface and send their data via an Argos satellite back to the laboratory for two weeks, which is the life of its battery. Even when the battery dies, the data are saved on the tag, so if it is ever recovered, the whole data set can be downloaded. This tag is useful for animals that do not spend a lot of time at the surface, and are not caught often. Numerous white sharks have been tagged with this tag. The tags are attached to white sharks by inserting a small surgical titanium anchor into it. On elephant seals, the tag is glued to the fur. Connecting the tag to the anchor is a thin line that loops around a metal pin at the base of the tag. This metal pin is connected to a battery. A clock in the tag turns the battery on at a preprogrammed time. When the battery turns on, the attachment pin dissolves. The tag floats to the surface and starts transmitting data to one of the Argos satellites.

Spot tags, or smart positioning, or temperature transmitting tags, are ideal tags for air-breathing marine animals (seals, whales and sea turtles) and animals that often swim close to the surface (salmon sharks, blue sharks and makos). When the antenna breaks the surface, it sends data to a satellite. The data include pressure, speed, and water temperature. Location is estimated by calculating the Doppler shift in the transmission signal in successive transmissions. When the animal goes beneath the surface, a saltwater switch turns off the tag. The tag, made by Wildlife Computers, lasts about two years.

Satellite relay data logger (SRDL) tags compress data so more information can be transmitted through the Argos satellite. These can be outfitted with CTD tags to record the salinity, temperature and depth data oceanographers need to identify ocean currents and water. Elephant seals, sea lions and leatherback sea turtles wear these tags.

== Programs ==
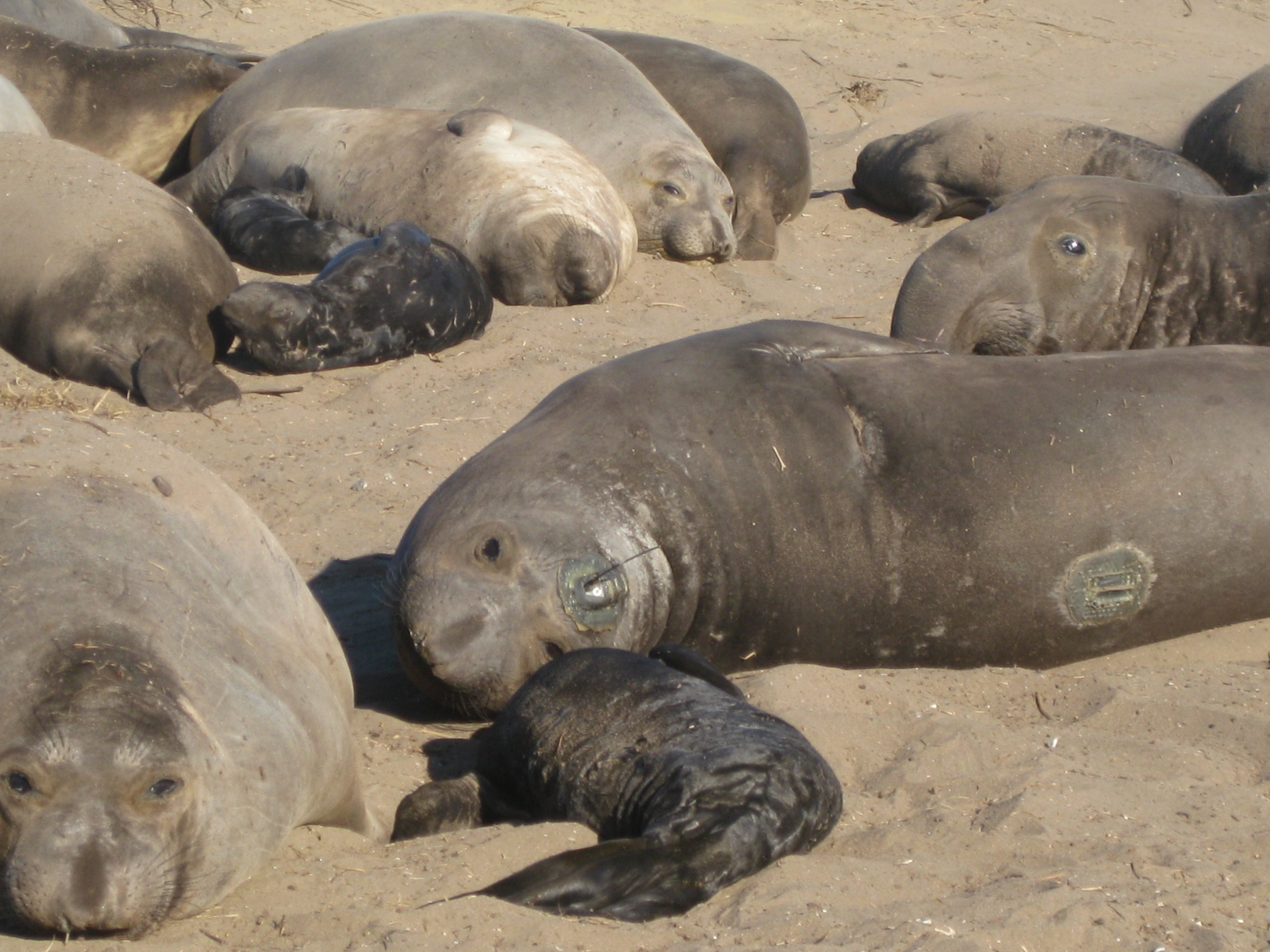
An elephant seal named Ellie tagged though TOPP

TOPP has also set up programs to engage the public in learning about marine science and marine conservation. One of its programs is called Elephant Seal Homecoming Days, which was started by TOPP in 2008 for the months the northern elephant seals return to Año Nuevo State Reserve during the breeding season. TOPP picks around 10 of the many they tagged to become "spokes-seals" for the public, allowing them to see what it is like being one of the biggest seals in the world. Elephant seals are prime candidates for tagging because they tend to return to the same beach every year to breed, yielding high tag recovery. They can gather immense amounts of information because they can swim for thousands of miles. The seals are issued their own Facebook profile that is kept up for them by undergraduate volunteer keepers. Facebook profiles keep the public updated on their progress while they give birth and proceed to take care of their pups. Two seals are the stars of TOPP Elephant Seal Homecoming Days. The first is Penelope Seal, who has been part of the program since 2008. The second one is new as of 2009, and his name is Stelephant Colbert (in reference to Stephen Colbert of The Colbert Report).

=== Early years ===
Stelephant started out as a pup in a small harem of northern elephant seals located at Año Nuevo State Reserve. He grew into one of the most famous elephant seals ever, even appearing on The Colbert Report. At around eight years old, Stelephant weighed 4,500-pound (2,000 kg). He gets by on his aggressiveness and determination to get as close to females as possible. Almost any male is turned away unless they wish to fight. These fights rarely last long, however, because Stelephant is a seasoned fighter.

After Stelephant Colbert was weaned, he spent the next few weeks on the beach waiting to join adult seals out in the northern Pacific Ocean. He returned the next year to the same beach on the California coast as a yearling, where he was exiled to the outskirts of the harems with the other yearlings. The next few years were spent building muscle and growing large to be able to compete with the larger males. During his third to fifth years, Stelephant practiced fighting with other young males to build strength; while he did compete with the adults, he spent most of his days far away from females. When he was around seven years old with his proboscis finally grown in, he was ready to compete with the adult males for the alpha position.

=== Tagging ===
Stelephant has been involved with the University of California, Santa Cruz Long Marine Lab researchers, and was tagged last spring to track his foraging habits while swimming and diving off the Aleutian Islands in the northern Pacific Ocean.

=== Current ===
Stelephant was issued his own Facebook page, where people can keep track of his whereabouts and his status updates. He is the most talked-about seal in the program in that he was featured in the Santa Cruz Sentinel, the Associated Press, and many additional media organizations. The biggest media event was when Stephen Colbert of The Colbert Report, after whom Stelephant is named, spoke of his seal on his show. Stelephant was featured in one of the show's episodes, creating a media buzz. Since then, Stelephant's fan base has skyrocketed bringing attention to TOPP and the UCSC Long Marine Lab Stelephant is associated with. Stelephant allowed TOPP to engage the public in learning about northern elephant seals, marine science, and marine conservation.

Stelephant is now an alpha male at Año Nuevo State Reserve, and will soon return to the ocean to forage once again. Stelephant was featured on Oceans Google Earth, which allows the user to explore the oceans. His tags were recovered in January and he was not tagged again.

== Penelope Seal ==
Penelope Seal is an elephant seal and one of the many marine animals tagged as a part of the TOPP program.

Penelope was born as a "little" 90 lb (41 kg) pup in early January 1998 at the Año Nuevo State Reserve on the California coast. Since then, she has become a 1,500 lb (680 kg) full grown female northern elephant seal with six pups of her own, and many fans who have contributed to her fame. From five years old, she has had one pup a year, all at Año Nuevo State Reserve. Penelope Seal is known as gnarly seal and a survivor, considering 50% of her species will die before they reach maturity. She has dark-brown fur that she molts (or sheds) once a year. The beach is a known hangout spot of hers and one can usually spot her basking in the sun, or if its raining, cuddling up to another elephant seal. She has had multiple relationships, never known to be a monogamous seal, and in fact living in a polygynous society. The group, or harem, is made up of many other females and an alpha male with which Penelope has been known to hang out. However, Penelope has also been seen socializing with some other beta males around the harem, much to the dismay of the alpha.

=== Early life ===
Penelope spent her early life as a weaner, or weaned pup, at Año Nuevo State Reserve. During this time she fasted on the beach waiting until she was brave enough to go out into the open ocean for the first time. The next year she became a yearling and spent her days being shunned from her harem, since she was still small compared to the others. Years two and three were spent much the same way. During this period she learned a lot about how to become a successful predator, like being able to travel all the way out into the northern Pacific Ocean and back again without any maps, and making it to the same place every time, which can be around an 8,000 mi (13,000 km) journey. However, when she was four years old, she became pregnant with her first pup and gave birth to him 10 months later at Año Nuevo State Reserve.

=== Tagging ===
Penelope is tagged with a small tag and collects data for the TOPP team's researchers. Penelope's tag has a time depth recorder, which documents the dive depth, dive duration, and light levels. Elephant seals are incredible divers and allow scientists to learn about their unique behavior and the environment in which they live. Elephant seals are prime candidates for tagging because they tend to return to the same beach every year to breed, yielding high tag recovery. They can gather immense amounts of information because they can swim for thousands of miles. Penelope herself has been involved with the University of California, Santa Cruz Long Marine Lab researchers and was tagged last year.

=== Current ===
Penelope has since had her seventh pup, and is living on the beaches of Año Nuevo State Reserve. She was not tagged this year. Stelephant Colbert has since taken on the challenge of promoting elephant seals, and has been quite successful.

Penelope is featured on the new version of Ocean Google Earth, which allows the user to explore the oceans. Penelope can be located at Año Nuevo State Reserve.

Penelope Seal has been the star of Elephant Seal Homecoming Days for the past two years. She enabled TOPP to engage the public in learning about northern elephant seals, marine science, and marine conservation.

== The Great Turtle Race ==
The Great Turtle Race is an international sea turtle conservation event that brings together corporate sponsors and conservation organizations. The race tracks sea turtles as they move toward feeding areas south of the Galapagos Islands after nesting at Playa Grande in Costa Rica's Las Baulas National Park, the primary nesting area for leatherbacks in the Pacific.

TOPP is a cosponsor of The Great Turtle Race, and tracking technology created and used by TOPP is how the turtles are tracked. The race occurred in 2007 and 2008 in April.

== See also ==
- Año Nuevo State Reserve
- Leopard seal
- The Marine Mammal Center
- Pinniped
