= Helliwell Hills =

Hills in Antarctica

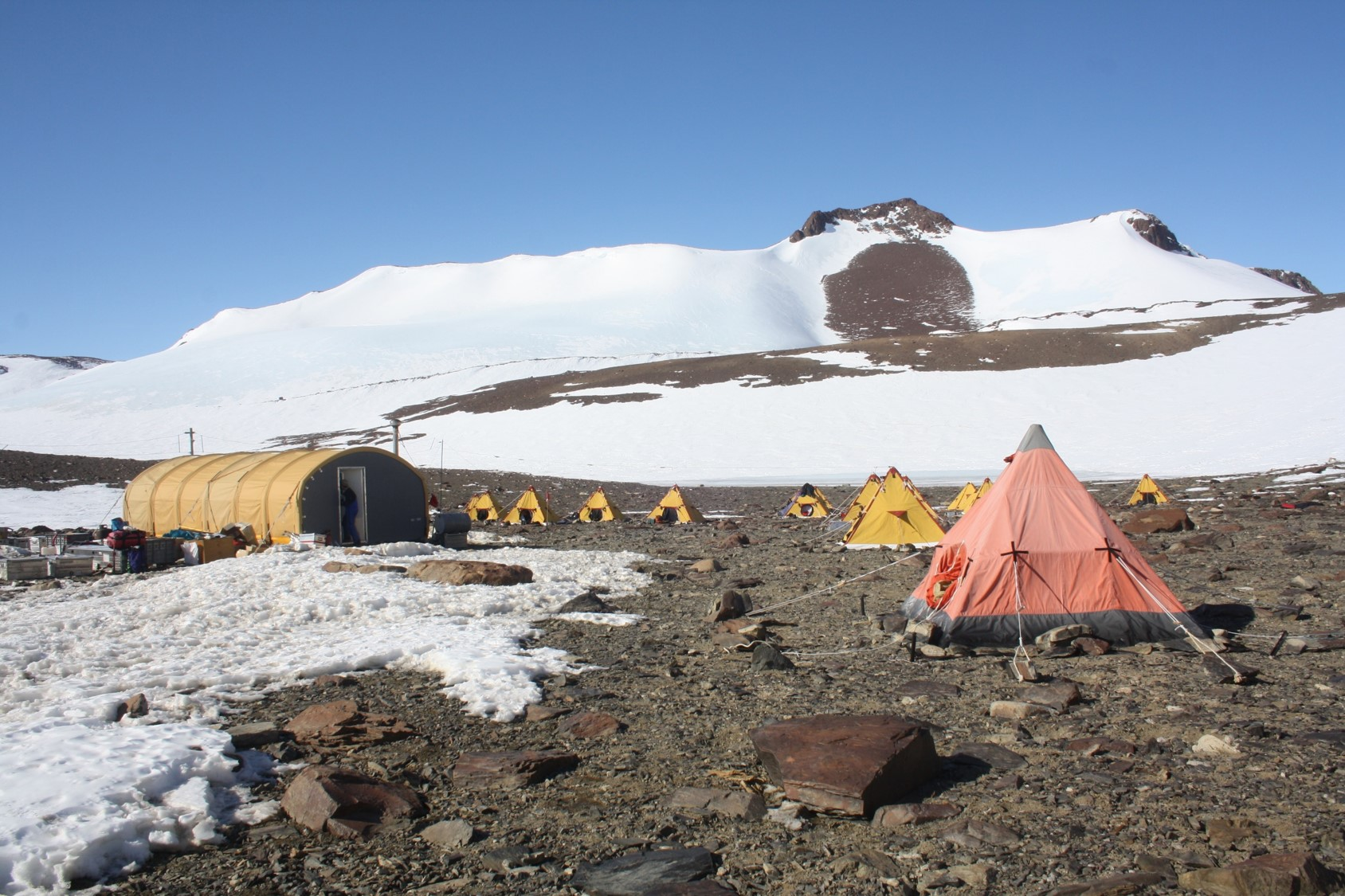
- Field camp in Helliwell Hills during GANOVEX 11 (2015/16)

Geography
- Location within Antarctica
- Range coordinates: 71°50′S 161°25′E

The Helliwell Hills (71°50′S 161°25′E) are a group of rocky hills and low mountains about 18 miles (29 km) long and 9 miles (14 km) wide in the Usarp Mountains of North Victoria Land, Antarctica.

== Location ==
The Helliwell Hills are part of the Usarp Mountains of North Victoria Land, Antarctica. They are south of Gressitt Glacier and midway between Emlen Peaks to the west and the Morozumi Range to the east. They are south of the Daniels Range, on the other side of Gressitt Glacier, and north of the Outback Nunataks.

== Early exploration and name ==
The Helliwell Hills were mapped by United States Geological Survey (USGS) from surveys and United States Navy air photos in 1960-63. They were named by the Advisory Committee on Antarctic Names (US-ACAN) for Robert A. Helliwell of Stanford University, Program Director for the USARP study of very low frequency (VLF) radio noise phenomena.

== Geology ==
The cover rocks in the Helliwell Hills are Permian Beacon sediments and Jurassic Ferrar sills. The basement has low- to high-grade metamorphic rocks as well as pegmatite and granites. There is a fairly continuous transition from low to high grades in the metarnorphic rocks. This is evidence for intense local heat during metamorphism. The degree of metamorphism, deformation and pegmatite formation increases greatly from east to west in the hills. The phyllites at the lowest level in the east of Boggs Valley are similar to the rocks of the Morozumi Range, with simple deformation. Further west the deformation is more polyphase, and at least three phases of folding can be recognized in the west.

== Glacier ==
=== Gressitt Glacier ===
71°30′S 161°15′E. A broad glacier, about 45 mi long, draining the area between Daniels Range and Emlen Peaks in the Usarp Mountains and flowing northeast to enter the Rennick Glacier just north of the Morozumi Range. Mapped by USGS from surveys and U.S. Navy air photos, 1960–63. Named by US-ACAN for biologist J. Linsley Gressitt, Program Director who made biological studies, particularly in the Ross Sea area, in six austral summers, 1959-60 to 1965-66.

== Features ==
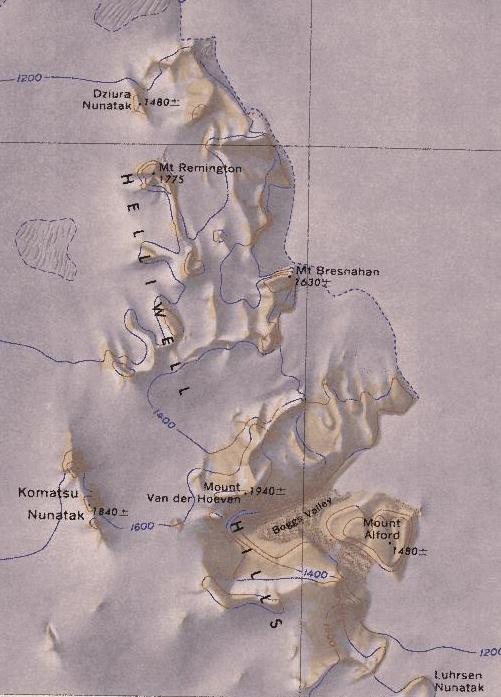
Helliwell Hills

Named features from north to south:

=== Dziura Nunatak ===
71°44′S 161°15′E. An ice-free nunatak, 1,480 metres (4,860 ft) high, located 2 miles (3.2 km) northwest of Mount Remington in the northwest extremity of the Helliwell Hills. Mapped by USGS from surveys and U.S. Navy air photos, 1960–63. Named by US-ACAN for Charles S. Dziura, USARP meteorologist at South Pole Station, 1967-68.

=== Mount Remington ===
71°46′S 161°17′E. A mountain, 1,775 metres (5,823 ft) high, 4 miles (6.4 km) northwest of Mount Bresnahan in the north part of Helliwell Hills. Mapped by USGS from surveys and U.S. Navy air photos, 1960–63. Named by US-ACAN for Benjamin F. Remington, Jr., meteorologist who wintered over at Little America V, 1957, and at South Pole Station, 1959.

=== Mount Bresnahan ===
71°48′S 161°28′E A flat-topped, mainly ice-free mountain, 1,630 metres (5,350 ft) high, situated along the east side of the Helliwell Hills, 6 miles (9.7 km) north-north-east of Mount Van der Hoeven. Mapped by USGS from surveys and U.S. Navy air photos, 1960–63. Named by US-ACAN after David M. Bresnahan, USARP biologist at McMurdo Station, 1967–68 and 1968–69; on staff of Office of Polar Programs, National Science Foundation, from 1970.

=== Komatsu Nunatak ===
71°55′S 161°11′E. A very prominent nunatak rising to 1,840 metres (6,040 ft) near its center. Located 4 miles (6.4 km) west of the summit of Mount Van der Hoeven in the west part of the Helliwell Hills. Mapped by USGS from surveys and U.S. Navy air photos, 1960–63. Named by US-ACAN for Stanley K. Komatsu, USARP biologist at McMurdo Station, 1966–67 and 1967-68.

=== Mount Van der Hoeven ===
71°54′S 161°25′E. A mountain, 1,940 metres (6,360 ft) high, at the north side of the head of Boggs Valley, near the center of Helliwell Hills. Mapped by USGS from surveys and U.S. Navy air photos, 1960-63. Named by US-ACAN for Frans G. Van der Hoeven, seismologist and leader of the USARPsponsored Victoria Land Traverse, 1959-60. The 1,530 mile seismic and topographic traverse in Tucker Sno-Cat vehicles took a roughly triangular course, beginning at Hut Point Peninsula, Ross Island, and ascending to the plateau of Victoria Land via Skelton Glacier. From there a northwest course was followed on interior plateau to 71°09'S, 139°12'E. The party returned eastward, keeping south of the 72°S parallel to 72°37'S, 161°32'E (east side of Outback Nunataks), from where the party was evacuated by aircraft of U.S. Navy Squadron VX-6.

=== Boggs Valley ===
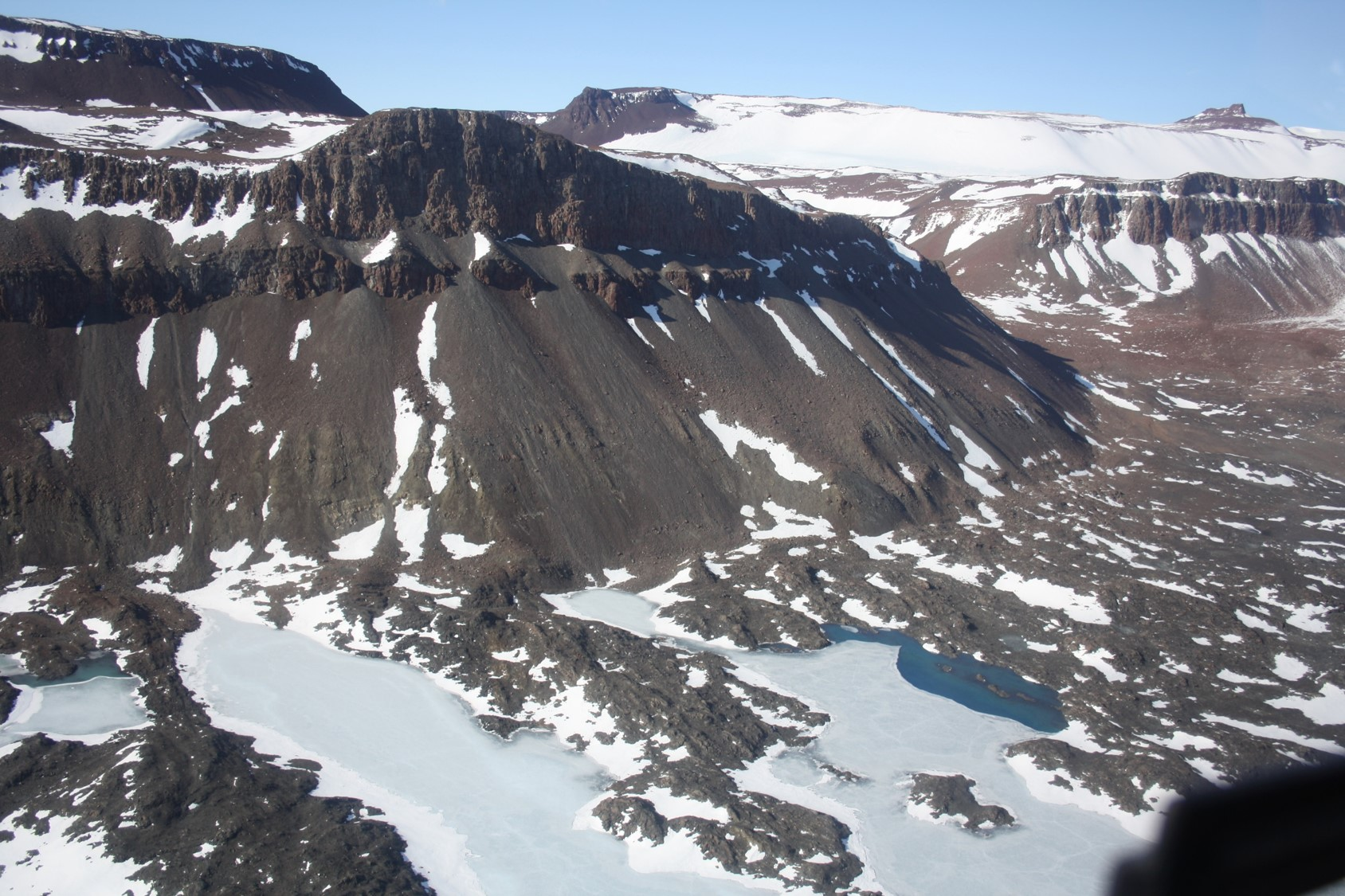
Boggs Valley 3 February 2016

71°55′S 161°30′E. A valley, heavily strewn with morainal debris, which indents the east side of Helliwell Hills between Mount Van der Hoeven and Mount Alford. Mapped by USGS from surveys and U.S. Navy air photos, 1960–63. Named by US-ACAN for William J. Boggs, USARP biologist at McMurdo Station, 1967-68.

=== Mount Alford ===
71°55′S 161°37′E A flat-topped, ice-free mountain, 1,480 metres (4,860 ft), at the south side of Boggs Valley in the Helliwell Hills. Mapped by USGS from surveys and U.S. Navy air photos, 1960–63. Named by US-ACAN for Montague Alford, USARP geologist at McMurdo Station, 1967-68.

=== Luhrsen Nunatak ===
71°59′S 161°41′E. A nunatak 3 miles (4.8 km) south-south-east of Mount Alford at the southeast end of the Helliwell Hills. Mapped by USGS from surveys and U.S. Navy air photos, 1960–63. Named by US-ACAN for Richard H. Luhrsen, assistant to the USARP representative at McMurdo Station, 1967-68.

== Sources ==
- Alberts, Fred G., ed. (1995), Geographic Names of the Antarctic (PDF) (2 ed.), United States Board on Geographic Names This article incorporates public domain material from websites or documents of the United States Board on Geographic Names.
- Tessensohn, Franz; Kleinschmidt, Georg; Henjes-Kunst, Friedhelm; Fenn, Günther (1990), "Gradational East-West Increase in Metamorphism in the Basement Rocks of the Helliwell Hills, Wilson Terrane, North Victoria Land, Antarctica" (PDF), Polarforschung, 60 (2): 117–120
