= Outback Nunataks =

Mountain group in Victoria Land, Antarctica

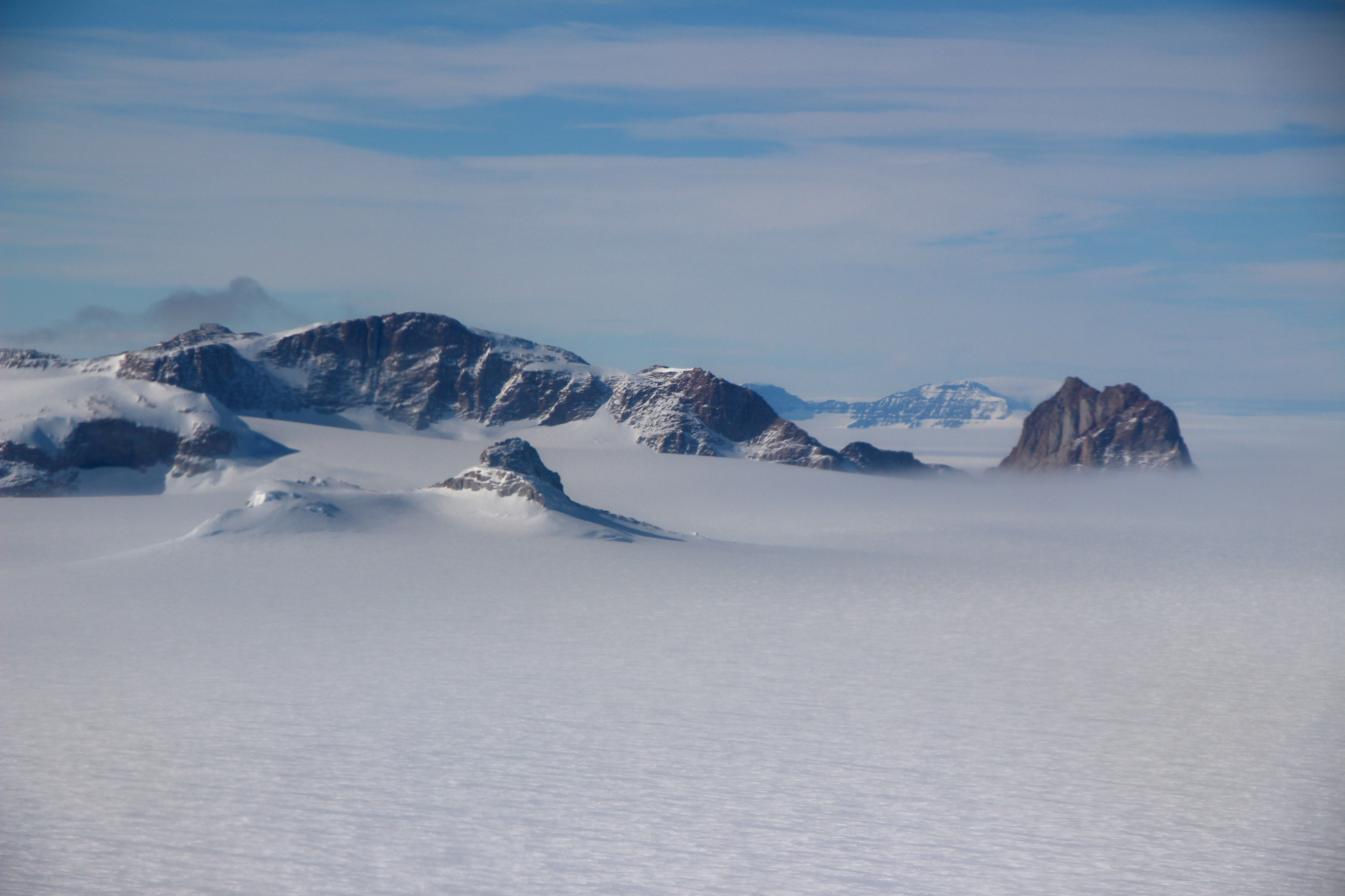
- Outback Nunataks in 2019

Geography
- Location within Antarctica
- Continent: Antarctica
- Region(s): Victoria Land, Antarctica
- Range coordinates: 72°30′S 160°30′E

The Outback Nunataks (72°30′S 160°30′E) are a series of bare rock nunataks and mountains which are distributed over an area about 40 nautical miles (74 km; 46 mi) long by 20 nautical miles (37 km; 23 mi) wide. The group lies south of Emlen Peaks of the Usarp Mountains and west of Monument Nunataks and upper Rennick Glacier, adjacent to the featureless interior plateau.

== Exploration and naming ==
The Outback Nunataks were discovered by the United States Victoria Land Traverse party, 1959–60, and mapped by United States Geological Survey (USGS) from surveys and United States Navy air photos, 1959–64. They were so named by the Advisory Committee on Antarctic Names (US-ACAN) for their remote position at the posterior side of the large mountain belt that extends from the Ross Sea to the interior ice plateau.

== Location ==
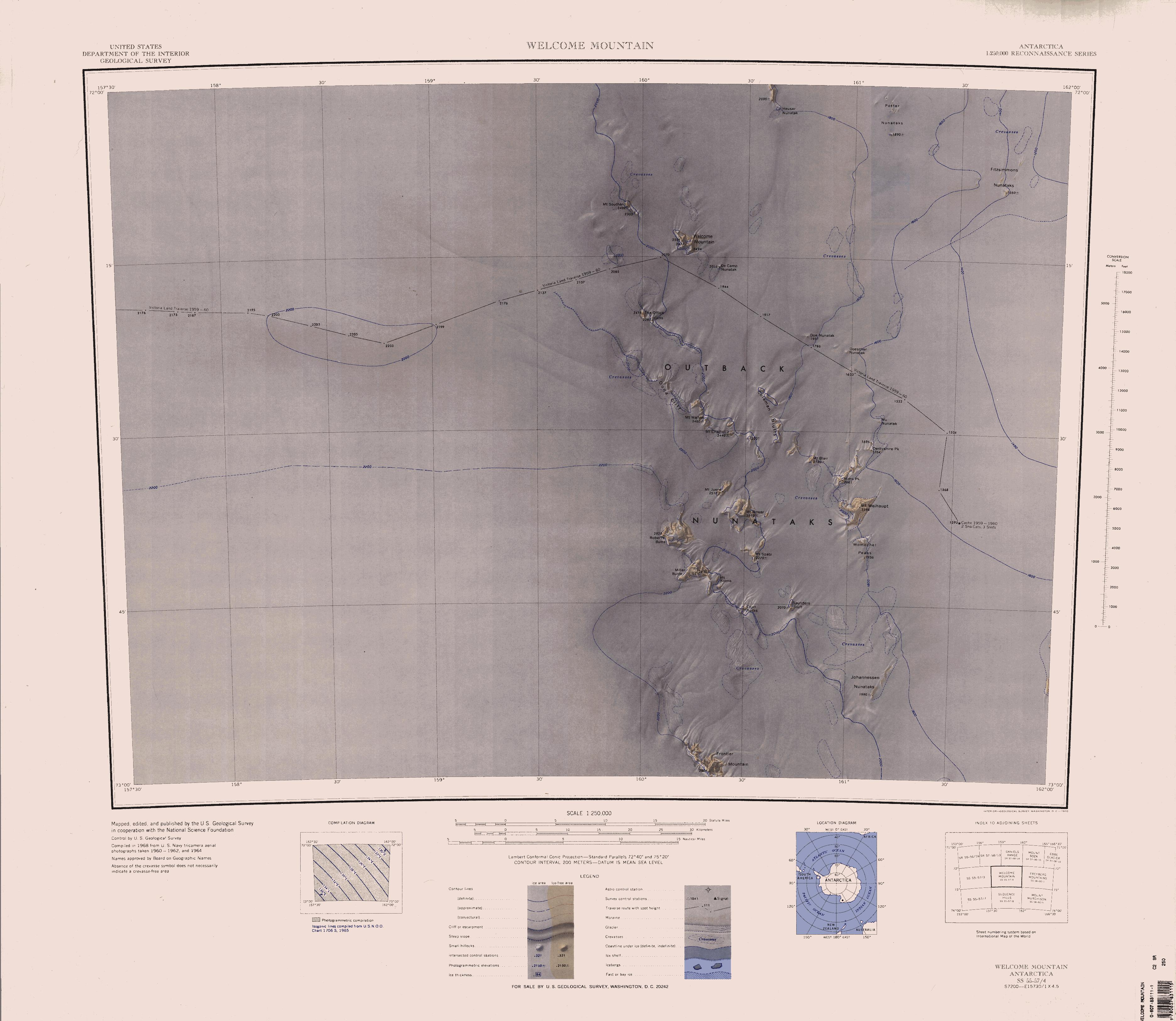
1:250,000 scale topographic map of Outback Nunataks showing the course of the U.S. Victoria Land Traverse party 1959–60.

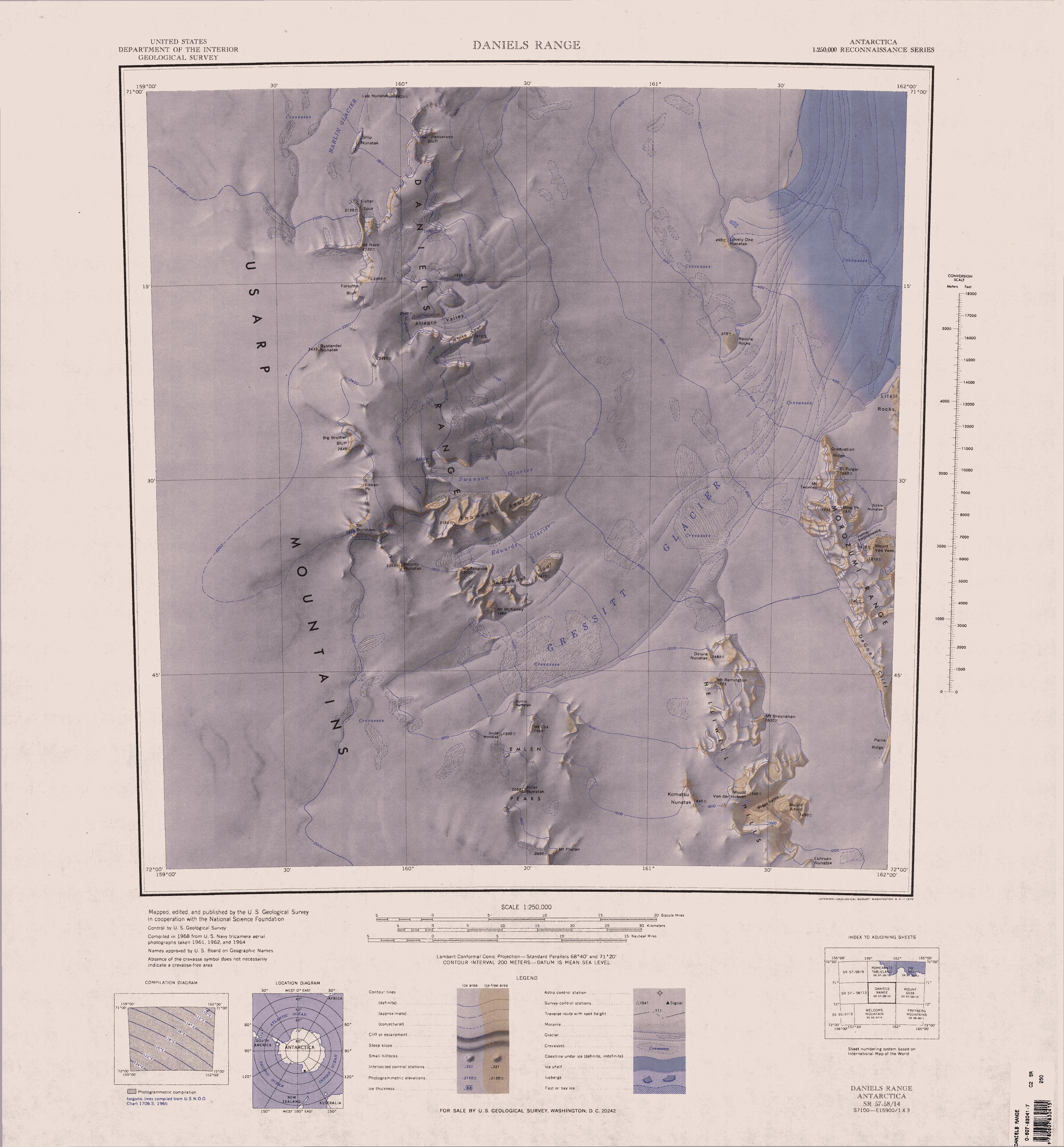
Region to the north

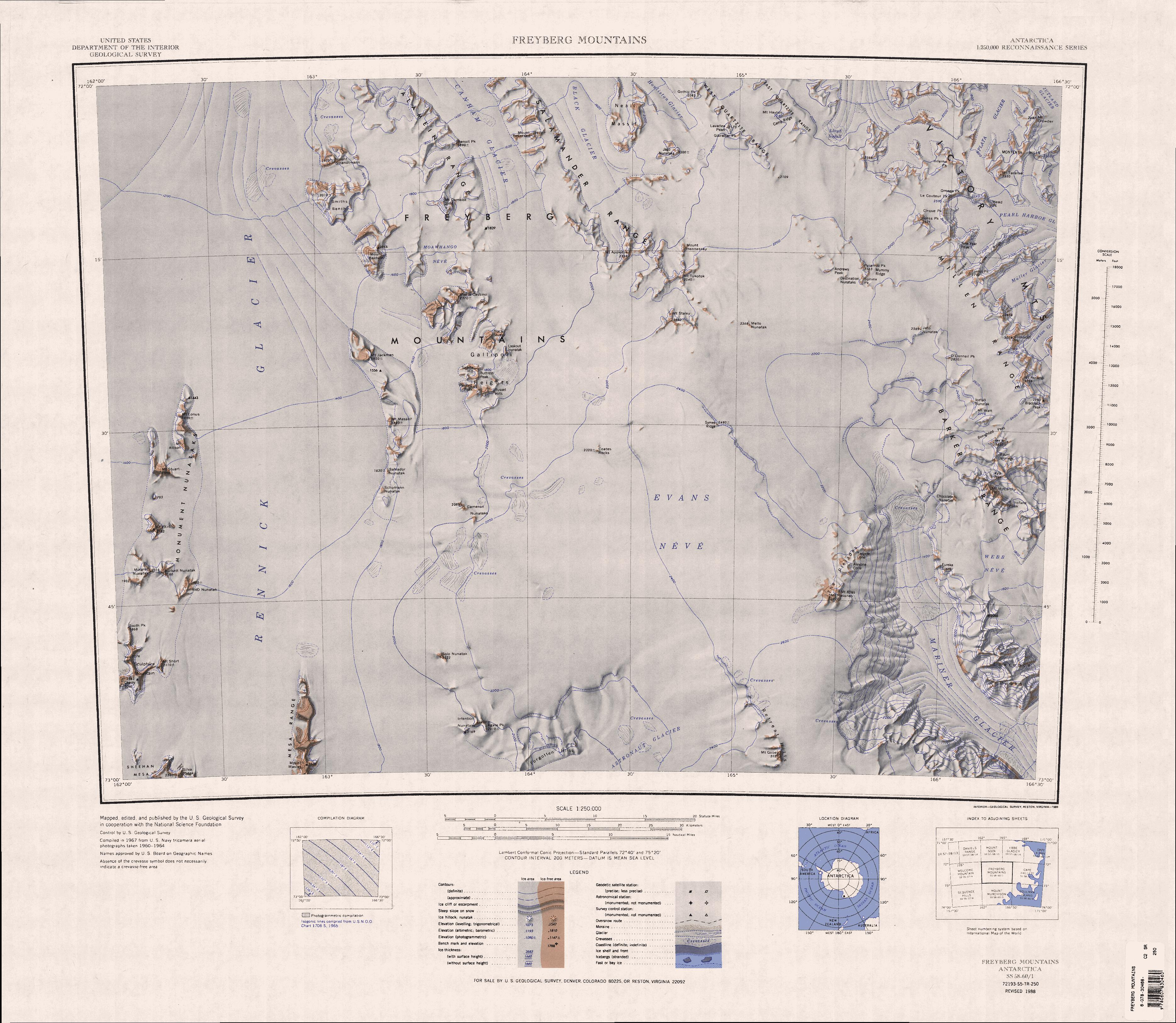
Region to the east

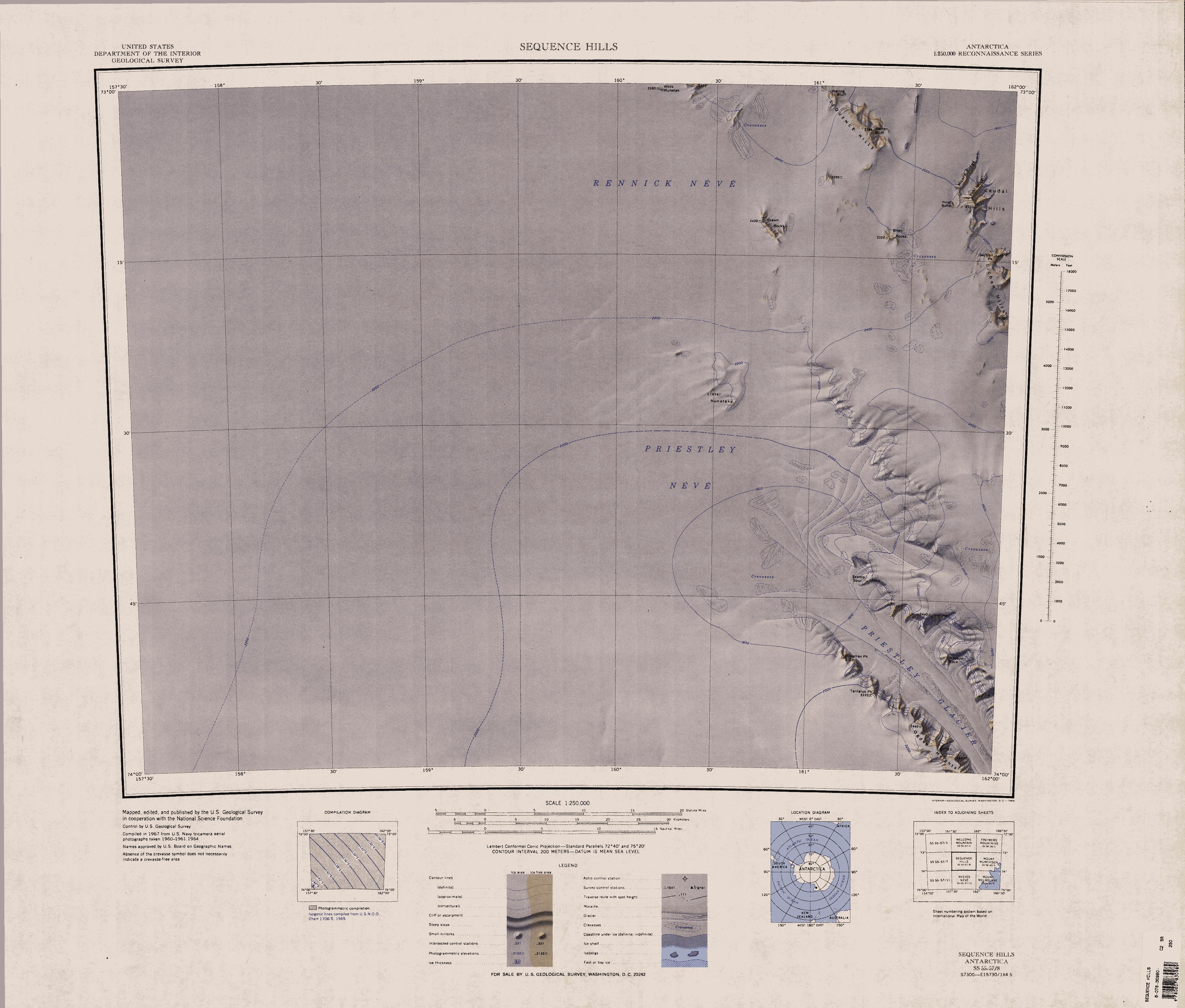
Region to the south

The terrain to the west of the nunataks is a featureless expanse of the polar plateau. The Emlen Peaks of the Usarp Mountains and the Helliwell Hills are to the north. The Rennick Glacier, the Freyberg Mountains, the Monument Nunataks and the Mesa Range are to the east. The Rennick Névé and the Sequence Hills are to the south.

== Northwestern features ==
Northwestern features include Mount Southard, Welcome Mountain, De Camp Nunatak, The Office Girls, Oona Cliff, Mount Walton, Mount Chadwick and Coleman Bluffs.

=== Mount Southard ===
72°11′S 159°56′E. A lone mountain 2,400 metres (7,900 ft) high standing 5 nautical miles (9.3 km; 5.8 mi) northwest of Welcome Mountain in the northwest extremity of the Outback Nunataks. Named by US-ACAN for Rupert B. Southard, Chief, Office of International Activities, USGS, with responsibility for USGS field parties working in Antarctica; later Chief of the Topograpic Division of USGS.

=== Welcome Mountain ===
72°14′S 160°12′E. A very prominent mountain that is surmounted by three peaks, the highest 2,505 metres (8,219 ft) high, standing 5 nautical miles (9.3 km; 5.8 mi) southeast of Mount Southard. Discovered and named by the United States Victoria Land Traverse party, 1959-60. So named because it was the first mountain visited by the traverse party after crossing the interior plateau and not seeing any mountains or landmark features for nearly three months.

=== De Camp Nunatak ===
72°16′S 160°22′E. A lone nunatak standing 3 nautical miles (5.6 km; 3.5 mi) southeast of Welcome Mountain. Named by US-ACAN for Michael A. de Camp, biologist at McMurdo Station, 1966-67.

=== The Office Girls ===
72°20′S 160°01′E. Two prominent rock nunataks along an ice cliff, situated 7 nautical miles (13 km; 8.1 mi) southwest of Welcome Mountain. Named by US-ACAN to express appreciation for the dedicated support provided to Antarctic programs by home-based personnel.

=== Oona Cliff ===
72°27′S 160°09′E. A north-facing rock and ice cliff, about 4 nautical miles (7.4 km; 4.6 mi) long, situated just northwest of Mount Walton. Named by US-ACAN for Hain Oona, ionospheric physicist at South Pole Station, 1968.

=== Mount Walton ===
72°29′S 160°18′E. A sharp, bare mountain 2,460 metres (8,070 ft) high rising midway between Oona Cliff and Mount Chadwick. Named by US-ACAN for Fred W. Walton, geomagnetist/seismologist at South Pole Station, 1968.

=== Mount Chadwick ===
72°30′S 160°26′E. A small, bare rock mountain 2,440 metres (8,010 ft) high situated 2.5 nautical miles (4.6 km; 2.9 mi) east-southeast of Mount Walton. Named by US-ACAN for Dan M. Chadwick, meteorologist at South Pole Station, 1968.

=== Coleman Bluffs ===
72°28′S 160°37′E. A loose chain of rock and ice bluffs that trend generally north–south for 5 nautical miles (9.3 km; 5.8 mi), situated near the center of the Outback Nunataks, about 10 nautical miles (19 km; 12 mi) northwest of Mount Weihaupt. Named by US-ACAN for Harold L. Coleman, meteorologist at South Pole Station, 1968.

== Northeastern features ==
Northeastern features include Doe Nunatak, Doescher Nunatak and Wu Nunatak.

=== Doe Nunatak ===
72°22′S 160°47′E. A somewhat isolated nunatak, situated 3 nautical miles (5.6 km; 3.5 mi) west-northwest of Doescher Nunatak and 15 nautical miles (28 km; 17 mi) north-northwest of Mount Weihaupt. Named by US-ACAN after Wilfred I. Doe, United States Navy, hospital corpsman with the McMurdo Station winter party, 1967.

=== Doescher Nunatak ===
72°23′S 160°59′E. A somewhat isolated nunatak situated 13 nautical miles (24 km; 15 mi) north of Mount Weihaupt. Named by US-ACAN for Roger L. Doescher, glaciologist, McMurdo Station, 1967-68.

=== Wu Nunatak ===
72°29′S 161°08′E. A nunatak about 8 nautical miles (15 km; 9.2 mi) north-northeast of Mount Weihaupt. Named by US-ACAN for Tien H. Wu, glaciologist at McMurdo Station, 1966-67.

== Southwestern features ==
Southwestern features include Mount Joern, Mount Bower, Mount Spatz, Roberts Butte, Miller Butte, Mount Koons, Chan Rocks and Saunders Bluff.

=== Mount Joern ===
72°35′S 160°24′E. A ridgelike mountain 2,510 metres (8,230 ft) high standing 3 nautical miles (5.6 km; 3.5 mi) northwest of Mount Bower. Named by US-ACAN for Albert T. Joern, a researcher in physiopsychology with the winter party at South Pole Station, 1968.

=== Mount Bower ===
72°37′S 160°30′E. A prominent mountain 2,610 metres (8,560 ft) high standing 6 nautical miles (11 km; 6.9 mi) east-northeast of Roberts Butte. Named by US-ACAN for John R. Bower, ionospheric physicist at South Pole Station, 1968.

=== Mount Spatz ===
72°41′S 160°33′E. A mountain, 2,270 metres (7,450 ft) high, standing 10 nautical miles (19 km; 12 mi) west-southwest of Mount Weihaupt. Named by US-AC AN for Richard Spatz, station engineer at McMurdo Station, 1968.

=== Roberts Butte ===
72°39′S 160°08′E. A striking, flat-topped butte 2,830 metres (9,280 ft) high.that is very prominent and can be seen from great distances standing 2 nautical miles (3.7 km; 2.3 mi) northwest of Miller Butte. Discovered by the United States Victoria Land Traverse Party, 1959-60. Louis J. Roberts, USGS surveyor with this party, proposed the name "Rocky Top Mountain," but to avoid duplication with the one in Tennessee, U.S.A., the US-ACAN named it for Roberts who was first to survey the feature.

=== Miller Butte ===
72°42′S 160°15′E. A large rock butte located 2 nautical miles (3.7 km; 2.3 mi) southeast of Roberts Butte. Named by US-ACAN for Carl D. Miller, geophysicist at McMurdo Station, 1967-68.

=== Mount Koons ===
72°43′S 160°22′E. A small mountain situated 1 nautical mile (1.9 km; 1.2 mi) east of Miller Butte. Named by US-ACAN for Robert W. Koons, United States ArmyRP logistics coordinator with the McMurdo Station winter party, 1968.

=== Chan Rocks ===
72°45′S 160°30′E. A group of rocks along an ice bluff situated 5 nautical miles (9.3 km; 5.8 mi) southeast of Miller Butte. Named by US-ACAN for Lian Chan, engaged in laboratory management, McMurdo Station winter party, 1968.

=== Saunders Bluff ===
72°45′S 160°44′E. A small, isolated bluff standing 9 nautical miles (17 km; 10 mi) east-southeast of Miller Butte. Named by US-ACAN for Jeffrey J. Saunders, biolab technician at McMurdo Station, 1965-66.

== Southeastern features ==
Southeastern features include Derbyshire Peak, Mount Blair, Nims Peak, Mount Weihaupt and Womochel Peaks.

=== Derbyshire Peak ===
72°31′S 161°06′E. A small rock peak 5 nautical miles (9.3 km; 5.8 mi) north-northeast of Mount Weihaupt. Named by US-ACAN for Edward Derbyshire, geologist at McMurdo Station, 1966-67.

=== Mount Blair ===
72°32′S 160°49′E. A small but conspicuous mountain 2,120 metres (6,960 ft) high standing 6 nautical miles (11 km; 6.9 mi) northwest of Mount Weihaupt. Named by US-ACAN for Terence T. Blair, biologist at McMurdo Station, 1966-67.

=== Nims Peak ===
72°34′S 160°58′E. A sharp rock peak about 3 nautical miles (5.6 km; 3.5 mi) northwest of Mount Weihaupt. Named by US-ACAN for David J. Nims, ionospheric physicist at McMurdo Station, 1968.

=== Mount Weihaupt ===
72°37′S 161°03′E. A large, bare mountain 2,285 metres (7,497 ft) high which stands 10 nautical miles (19 km; 12 mi) east of Mount Bower and is the dominant feature in the east part of the Outback Nunataks. First mapped by the United States Victoria Land Traverse party, 1959-60. Named by US-ACAN for John G. Weihaupt, seismologist with this party.

=== Womochel Peaks ===
72°40′S 161°04′E. Low rock peaks about 2 nautical miles (3.7 km; 2.3 mi) south of Mount Weihaupt. Named by US-ACAN for Daniel R. Womochel, biologist at McMurdo Station, 1967-68.

== Nearby features ==
Nearby features include, clockwise from the north, Potter Nunataks, Fitzsimmons Nunataks, Johannessen Nunataks, Frontier Mountain and Wilds Nunatak.

=== Potter Nunataks ===
72°02′S 161°10′E. A group of small, rather isolated nunataks about 6 nautical miles (11 km; 6.9 mi) southwest of the Helliwell Hills and 20 nautical miles (37 km; 23 mi) northeast of Welcome Mountain of the Outback Nunataks. Named by US-ACAN for Neal Potter, economist, McMurdo Station, 1965-66, who made a study of the economic potentials of Antarctica.

=== Fitzsimmons Nunataks ===
72°08′S 161°42′E. A group of small nunataks about 27 nautical miles (50 km; 31 mi) east-northeast of Welcome Mountain of the Outback Nunataks and 8 nautical miles (15 km; 9.2 mi) southeast of Helliwell Hills. Named by US-ACAN for John M. Fitzsimmons, biologist at McMurdo Station, 1965-66.

=== Johannessen Nunataks ===
72°52′S 161°11′E. An isolated, ridgelike outcropping of rocks about 4 nautical miles (7.4 km; 4.6 mi) long, standing 15 nautical miles (28 km; 17 mi) south of Mount Weihaupt in the south extremity of the Outback Nunataks. Named by US-ACAN for Karl R. Johannessen, meteorologist at McMurdo Station, 1967-68.

=== Frontier Mountain ===
72°59′S 160°20′E. A large, mainly ice-free mountain 2,805 metres (9,203 ft) high situated 20 nautical miles (37 km; 23 mi) south-southeast of Roberts Butte of the Outback Nunataks, and 11 nautical miles (20 km; 13 mi) west-northwest of the Sequence Hills, near the edge of the featureless, interior ice plateau. Named by the northern party of NZGSAE, 1962-63, because of its geographical location.

=== Wilds Nunatak ===
73°01′S 160°13′E. A lone nunatak located 2 nautical miles (3.7 km; 2.3 mi) west of the south end of Frontier Mountain. Named by US-ACAN for Ronald F. Wilds, aviation machinist's mate with USN Squadron VX-6 at McMurdo Station, 1966.

== Sources ==
- Alberts, Fred G., ed. (1995), Geographic Names of the Antarctic (PDF) (2 ed.), United States Board on Geographic Names This article incorporates public domain material from websites or documents of the United States Board on Geographic Names.
- Daniels Range, USGS: United States Geographic Board
- Freyberg Mountains, USGS: United States Geographic Board
- Sequence Hills, USGS: United States Geographic Board
- Welcome Mountain, USGS: United States Geographic Board

This article incorporates public domain material from websites or documents of the United States Geological Survey.
