= Marzolf =

Marzolf may refer to:

- Mount Marzolf, Antarctic peak
  - its namesake geologist John E. Marzolf
- Harald Marzolf (born 1980), French canoeist
- Helgard Marzolf (born 1983), French canoeist
