= Pomerantz Tableland =

Plateau in Antarctica

- Location within Antarctica

Geography
- Range coordinates: 70°38′S 159°50′E

The Pomerantz Tableland (70°38′S 159°50′E) is a 2,290 metres (7,510 ft) high ice-covered tableland in the Usarp Mountains, Antarctica. It is about 10 nautical miles (19 km; 12 mi) long, standing 15 nautical miles (28 km; 17 mi) northwest of Daniels Range.

== Early exploration and naming ==
The Pomerantz Tableland was mapped by USGS from surveys and U.S. Navy air photos in 1960–62. Named by US-ACAN for Martin A. Pomerantz, Director of the Barthol Research Foundation and Chairman of the U.S. Committee for the International Year of the Quiet Sun, who carried on cosmic ray studies in the McMurdo Sound area, 1959–60 and 1960-61.

== Glaciers ==
=== Helfferich Glacier ===
70°35′S 160°12′E. A glacier about 8 miles (13 km) long which drains the east slopes of Pomerantz Tableland southward of Armstrong Platform, in the Usarp Mountains. Mapped by USGS from surveys and U.S. Navy air photos, 1960-62. Named by US-ACAN for Merritt R. Helfferich, USARP worker in the field of ionospheric physics at South Pole Station, 1967-68.

=== Pitzman Glacier ===
70°41′S 160°10′E. A glacier, 6 miles (9.7 km) long, draining the southeast slopes of Pomerantz Tableland in the Usarp Mountains. It flows between Mount Lowman and Williams Bluff to an ice piedmont just eastward. Mapped by USGS from surveys and U.S. Navy air photos, 1960–62. Named by US-ACAN for Frederick J. Pitzman, USARP biologist at McMurdo Station, 1967-68.

== Features ==
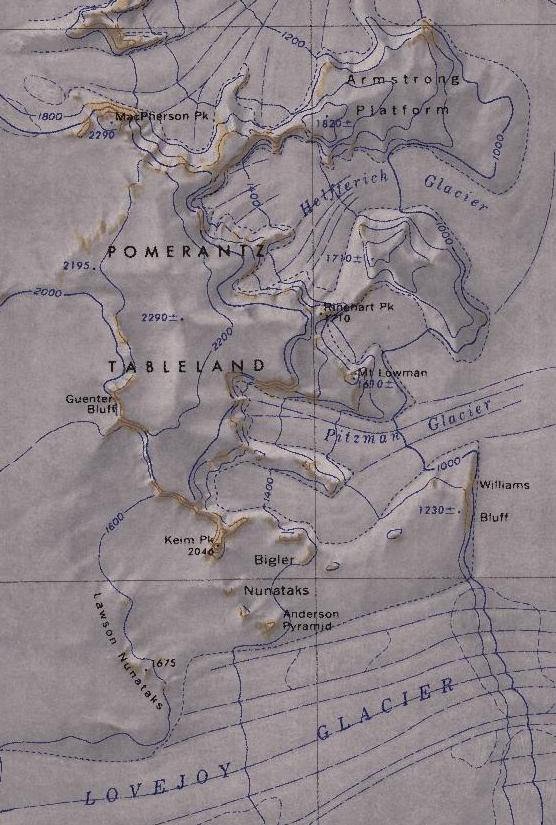
1:250,000 scale topographic map of the Pomerantz Tableland

Features, from north to south, include:

=== Armstrong Platform ===
70°32′S 160°10′E. A mainly ice-covered height, or small plateau, which is a northeastward extension of Pomerantz Tableland. The feature is 5 miles (8.0 km) long and ranges from 1,200 to 1,800 metres (3,900 to 5,900 ft) in elevation. It rises directly north of Helfferich Glacier. Mapped by USGS from surveys and U.S. Navy aerial photographs, 1960-62. Named by the Advisory Committee on Antarctic Names (US-ACAN) for Richard L. Armstrong, USARP geologist at McMurdo Station, 1967-68.

=== MacPherson Peak ===
70°33′S 159°43′E. A prominent rock peak, 2,290 metres (7,510 ft) high, on the northwest end of Pomerantz Tableland. Mapped by USGS from surveys and United States Navy air photos, 1960-62. Named by US-ACAN for Frank L. MacPherson, USA, helicopter mechanic in the field supporting the USGS surveys Topo North-South (1961-62) and Topo EastWest (1962-63), the latter including survey of this peak.

=== Spectator Nunatak ===
70°37′S 159°29′E. An isolated, mainly ice-covered nunatak consisting of hornblende, standing 4 miles (6.4 km) west of the Pomerantz Tableland. The feature was used as a survey station by the NZGSAE (1963-64), who gave the name because of its aspect.

=== Rinehart Peak ===
70°38′S 160°01′E. A peak, 1,710 metres (5,610 ft) high, which rises from a ridge on the east-central slopes of Pomerantz Tableland. The feature stands at the south side of the head of Helfferich Glacier. Mapped by USGS from, surveys and U.S. Navy aerial photographs, 1960-62. Named by US-ACAN for Floyd J. Rinehart, USARP geophysicist at McMurdo Station, 1967-68.

=== Mount Lowman ===
70°39′S 160°03′E. A mountain, 1,610 metres (5,280 ft) high, on the east-central slopes of Pomerantz Tableland, 2 miles (3.2 km) southeast of Rinehart Peak. Mapped by USGS from surveys and U.S. Navy air photos, 1960-62. Named by US-ACAN for Henry R. Lowman III, USARP biologist at McMurdo Station, 1967-68.

=== Guenter Bluff ===
70°40′S 159°44′E. A prominent rock bluff on the west side of Pomerantz Tableland. Mapped by USGS from surveys and U.S. Navy aerial photographs, 1960-62. Named by US-ACAN for Clarence A. Guenter, USARP worker in the field of physiopsychology at South Pole Station, 1967-68.

=== Keim Peak ===
70°44′S 159°52′E. A noteworthy pointed rock peak, 2,045 metres (6,709 ft) high, on the southern spur of Pomerantz Tableland. Mapped by USGS from surveys and U.S. Navy aerial photographs, 1960-62. Named by US-ACAN for Mike B. Keim, USN, aerial photographer on flights by Squadron VX-6 in Victoria Land in 1962-63; returned to Antarctica in 1963-64.

=== Williams Bluff ===
70°43′S 160°12′E). A rock and ice bluff 7 nautical miles (13 km; 8.1 mi) east of Keim Peak. The east-facing bluff rises between the Pitzman and Lovejoy Glaciers. Mapped by United States Geological Survey (USGS) from surveys and U.S. Navy air photos, 1960–62. Named by US-ACAN for Harry N. Williams of U.S. Navy Squadron VX-6, aerial photographer on flights over Victoria Land and other Antarctic areas in three summer seasons, 1960–63.

=== Bigler Nunataks ===
70°45′S 159°55′E. A cluster of notable nunataks lying southeastward of Pomerantz Tableland between Keim Peak and Lovejoy Glacier. Mapped by USGS from surveys and United States Navy aerial photographs, 1960-62. Named by US-ACAN for John C. Bigler, USARP biologist at McMurdo Station, 1966-67.

=== Anderson Pyramid ===
70°46′S 159°56′E. A distinctive pyramidal peak, the southernmost member of the Bigler Nunataks. It was named by US-ACAN for Staff Sergeant Robert J. Anderson, U. S. Army, non-commissioned officer in charge of the enlisted detachment of the helicopter group supporting the United States Geological Survey survey Topo East-West, 1962–63, which included the survey of this feature.

== Sources ==
- Alberts, Fred G., ed. (1995), Geographic Names of the Antarctic (PDF) (2 ed.), United States Board on Geographic Names This article incorporates public domain material from websites or documents of the United States Board on Geographic Names.
