= Daniels Range =

Mountain range of the Usarp Mountains, Antarctica

- Location within Antarctica

Geography
- Range coordinates: 71°15′S 160°00′E

The Daniels Range (71°15′S 160°00′E) is a principal mountain range of the Usarp Mountains, about 80 km (50 mi) long and 16 km (10 mi) wide, bounded to the north by Harlin Glacier and to the south by Gressitt Glacier.

== Exploration and name ==
The range was mapped by the United States Geological Survey (USGS) from surveys and United States Navy air photographs in 1960–63. It was named by the Advisory Committee on Antarctic Names (US-ACAN) after Ambassador Paul Clement Daniels (1903–86), a leading American figure in the formulation of the Antarctic Treaty in 1959.

== Location ==
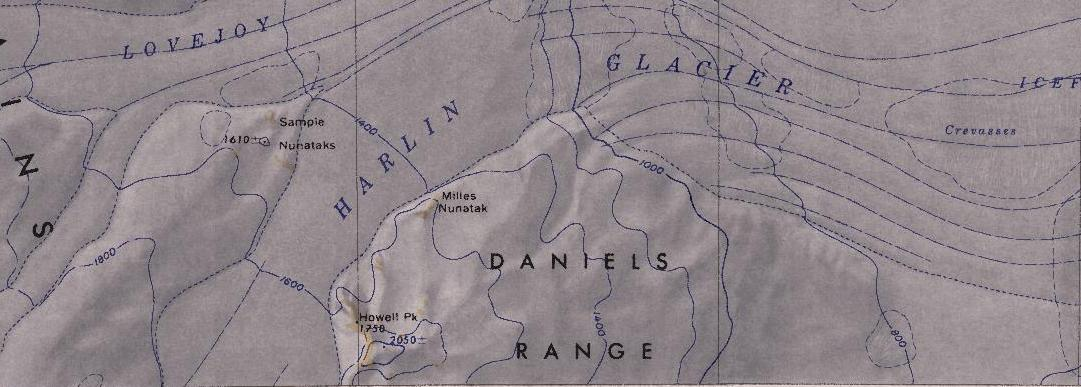
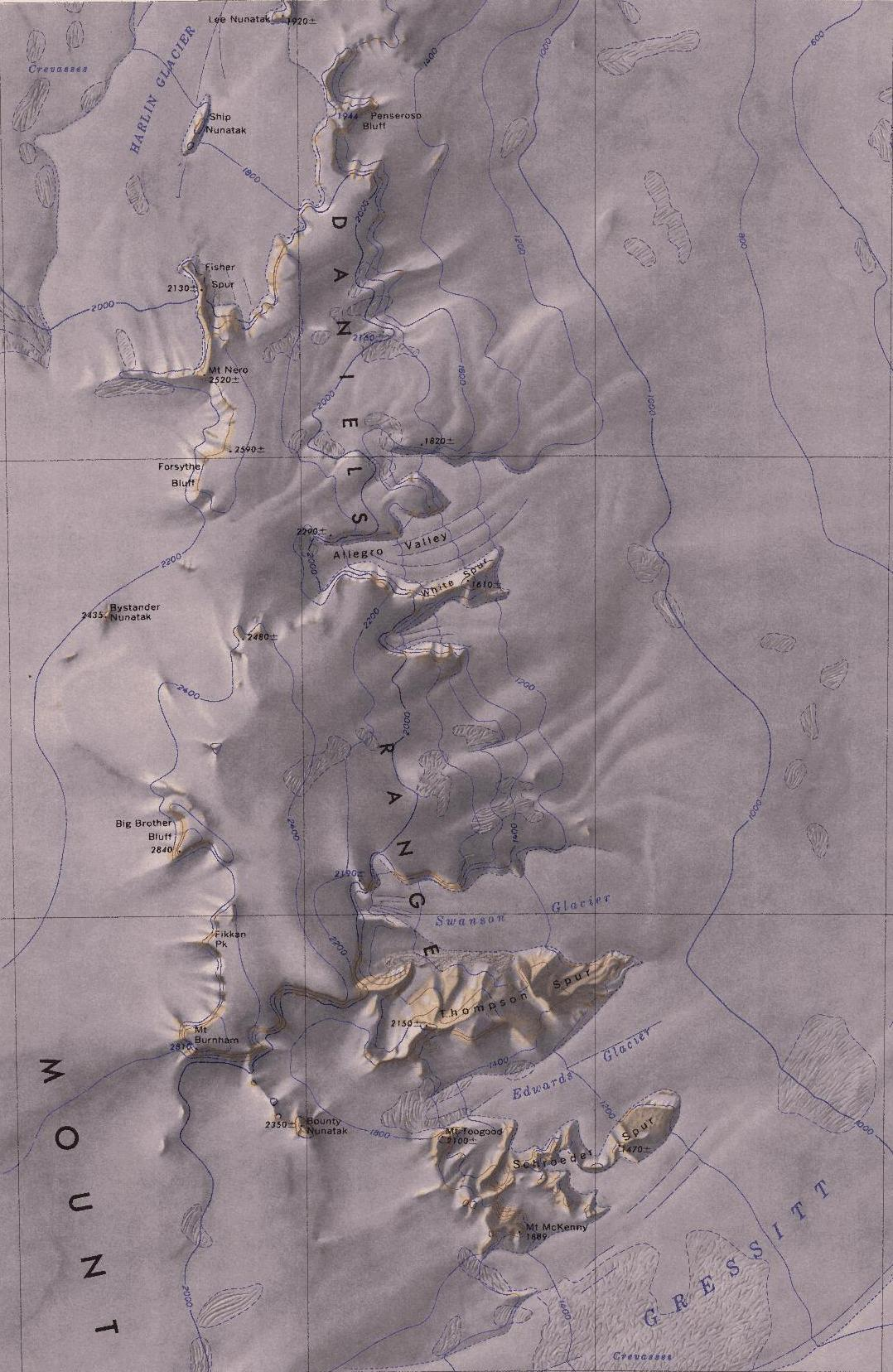
1:250,000 scale topographic map of the Daniels Range

The Daniels Range is in the Usarp Mountains in northern Victoria Land. The range is aligned north–south. It is about 80 kilometres (50 mi) long and has an area of about 2,200 square kilometres (850 sq mi). The western flank is gently inclined and merges into the polar plateau, while the eastern flank is generally steep. Bedrock is exposed extensively along both the west and the east of the range where ridges jut out from the ice-covered crest of the mountains. Often the cliffs and peaks rise several hundred meters above the ice.

The Emlen Peaks, Helliwell Hills and Morozumi Range are to the south and southwest. The Rennick Glacier is to the west. The Pomerantz Tableland is to the north.

== Geology ==
The Daniels Range seems to be a large fault block that may have been uplifted more along the eastern flank. The range is underlain by a structurally complex combination of intrusive rocks and intensely deformed metamorphic rocks. Most of the plutonic rocks were formed at the same time as the Granite Harbour Intrusives. Almost all the metamorphic rocks are sedimentary in origin.

The basement rocks of the Daniels Range consists of the Rennick Schist, Wilson Gneisses (Note: The use of the term "Wilson gneisses" has been questioned, since they include ortho-gneisses, para-gneisses and many type of migmatite.) and Granite Harbor Intrusives. These stratigraphic units are exposed in the Allegro Valley and Largo Valley, along the Thompson Spur and Schroeder Spur, and in other locations in the range. The Rennick Schist grades into the Wilson Gneisses, which may imply that the gneisses were formed from the schist by regional metamorphosis and partial melting. The Wilson Gneisses appear to have cooled in the Neoproterozoic or early Paleozoic. The Rennick Schist crystalized around 532 Ma, in the Early Cambrian.

== Glaciers ==
The Gressitt Glacier forms to the south of the southern end of the range and flows northeast past the range to join the Rennick Glacier. The Edwards Glacier and Swanson Glacier form in the southern part of the range and flow east towards the Gressit Glacier. The Harlin Glacier forms to the west of the northern part of the range, and flows north and then east round the north of the range to join the Rennick Glacier, which empties into Rennick Bay.

=== Edwards Glacier ===
71°35′S 160°30′E. A glacier draining the east slopes of Daniels Range between Thompson Spur and Schroeder Spur, in the Usarp Mountains. Mapped by USGS from surveys and U.S. Navy air photos, 1960-63. Named by US-ACAN for Lloyd N. Edwards, USARP geologist at McMurdo Station, 1967–68.

=== Swanson Glacier ===
71°30′S 160°24′E. A glacier, 9 miles (14 km) long, draining the east slopes of Daniels Range northward of Thompson Spur, in the Usarp Mountains. Mapped by USGS from surveys and U.S. Navy air photos, 1960-63. Named by US-ACAN for Charles D. Swanson, USARP biologist at McMurdo Station, 1967-68.

== Northern section ==
=== Milles Nunatak ===
70°55′S 160°06′E. A nunatak lying 3 mi NE of Howell Peak on the north end of Daniels Range, Usarp Mountains. Mapped by USGS from surveys and U.S. Navy aerial photographs, 1960-62. Named by US-AC AN for David B Milles, USARP biological laboratory technician at McMurdo Station, 1967-68.

=== Howell Peak ===
70°58′S 160°00′E. A small rock peak (1,750 m) on the NW end of Daniels Range, Usarp Mountains. Mapped by USGS from surveys and U.S. Navy aerial photographs, 1960-62. Named by US-ACAN for Kenneth R. Howell, USARP meteorologist at the South Pole Station, 1967-68.

=== Lee Nunatak ===
71°01′S 159°58′E. A nunatak (1,920 m) 4 miles (6.4 km) northwest of Penseroso Bluff in the northwest part of Daniels Range, Usarp Mountains. Mapped by USGS from surveys and U.S. Navy air photos, 1960-63. Named by US-ACAN for Chun Chi Lee, USARP biologist at McMurdo Station, 1967-68.

=== Ship Nunatak ===
71°04′S 159°50′E. A very striking nunatak which rises above the ice near the center of the upper portion of Harlin Glacier, in the Usarp Mountains. Mapped by USGS from surveys and U.S. Navy air photos, 1960–63. A descriptive name applied by US-ACAN because of the appearance of the feature, resembling that of a ship at sea.

=== Penseroso Bluff ===
71°04′S 160°06′E. A prominent bluff (1,945 m) surmounting the narrow, northern neck of the Daniels Range, 10 miles (16 km) northeast of Mount Nero, in the Usarp Mountains. The Northern Party of the NZGSAE, 1963-64, reached this bluff in gloomy weather. The feature appeared dark and sombre; hence, the party gave the name from Milton's "II Penseroso" in antithesis to Allegro Valley 14 miles to the south.

== Central section ==
=== Fisher Spur ===
71°09′S 159°50′E. A rugged rock spur jutting northward from the west flank of Daniels Range immediately north of Mount Nero, in the Usarp Mountains. Mapped by USGS from surveys and U.S. Navy air photos, 1960-63. Named by US-ACAN for Dean F. Fisher, USARP geophysicist at McMurdo Station, 1967-68.

=== Mount Nero ===
71°12′S 159°50′E. A mountain (2,520 m) surmounting the west wall of Daniels Range 3 miles (4.8 km) north of Forsythe Bluff, in the Usarp Mountains. Mapped by USGS from surveys and U.S. Navy air photos, 1960-63. Named by US-ACAN for Leonard L. Nero, USARP biologist at McMurdo Station, 1967-68.

=== Misch Crag ===
71°14′S 159°52′E A rock crag 1 mi NE of Forsythe Bluff, rising to c. 2,590 m on the west side of Daniels Range, Usarp Mountains. Mapped by USGS from surveys and USN aerial photographs, 1960–63. Named by US-ACAN in 1986 after Peter Misch, Professor Emeritus of Geology, University of Washington, who has contributed to the training of numerous geologists who have worked in the Antarctic.

=== Forsythe Bluff ===
71°16′S 159°50′E. A bluff rising to more than 2,500 metres (8,200 ft) along the west edge of Daniels Range, in the Usarp Mountains. The bluff is 11 miles (18 km) north of Big Brother Bluff. Mapped by USGS from surveys and U.S. Navy air photos, 1960-63. Named by US-ACAN after Warren L. Forsythe, USARP geologist at McMurdo Station, 1967-68.

=== Bystander Nunatak ===
71°20′S 159°40′E. A nunatak (2,435 m) lying 5 miles (8.0 km) southwest of Forsythe Bluff, on the W side of Daniels Range in the Usarp Mountains. The name applied by the northern party of NZGSAE, 1963-64, is suggestive of the aspect of this relatively isolated feature.

=== Allegro Valley ===
71°18′S 160°10′E. A steep-sided, glacier-filled valley indenting the east side of Daniels Range just north of White Spur, in the Usarp Mountains. The northern party of the New Zealand Geological Survey Antarctic Expedition (NZGSAE), 1963–64, experienced fine weather here after several days of unpleasant travel; therefore, members named it after John Milton's poem "L'Allegro" in antithesis with Penseroso Bluff, 14 mi to the north.

=== White Spur ===
71°19′S 160°16′E. A spur forming part of the south wall of Allegro Valley as it juts eastward from the central portion of the Daniels Range, Usarp Mountains. Mapped by USGS from surveys and U.S. Navy air photos, 1960–63. Named by US-ACAN for Russell F. White, USARP meteorologist at South Pole Station, 1967-68.

== Southeast section ==
=== Big Brother Bluff ===
71°28′S 159°48′E. A high, angular granite bluff (2,840 m) along the west wall of Daniels Range, 6 miles (9.7 km) north of Mount Burnham, in the Usarp Mountains. So named by the northern party of NZGSAE, 1963-64, because it is visible from 50 miles (80 km) north and from many points across Rennick Glacier. Hence the reminiscence from George Orwell's famous saying [Big Brother is Watching You].

=== Fikkan Peak ===
71°31′S 159°50′E A peak midway between Big Brother Bluff and Mount Burnham along the W wall of Daniels Range, in the Usarp Mountains. Mapped by USGS from surveys and U.S. Navy air photos, 1960-63. Named by US-ACAN for Philip R. Fikkan, USARP geologist at McMurdo Station, 1967-68.

=== Mount Burnham ===
71°34′S 159°50′E A projecting, bluff-type mountain (2,810 m) along the west wall of Daniels Range, 6 miles (9.7 km) south of Big Brother Bluff, in the Usarp Mountains. Mapped by USGS from surveys and U.S. Navy air photos, 1960-63. Named by US-AC AN for James B. Burnham, ionospheric physicist who wintered at South Pole Station in 1958 and 1961.

=== Bounty Nunatak ===
71°37′S 159°59′E. A prominent, largely ice-free nunatak, 2,350 metres (7,710 ft) high, located 4 miles (6.4 km) southeast of Mount Burnham in the south part of Daniels Range, Usarp Mountains. The name was applied by the NZGSAE, 1963–64, because the party was out of food upon arrival at a food and fuel cache established near this nunatak.

== Southwest section ==
=== Thompson Spur ===
71°33′S 160°23′E. A large, rugged mountain spur that descends eastward from Daniels Range between the Swanson Glacier and Edwards Glacier, in the Usarp Mountains. Mapped by USGS from surveys and U.S. Navy air photos, 1960-63. Named by US-ACAN for David H. Thompson, USARP biologist at Hallett Station, 1965-66 and 1967-68.

=== Mount Toogood ===
71°37′S 160°14′E. A mountain (2,100 m) at the south side of the head of Edwards Glacier in the Daniels Range, Usarp Mountains. Mapped by USGS from surveys and U.S. Navy air photos, 1960–63. Named by US-AC AN for David J. Toogood, USARP geologist at McMurdo Station, 1967-68 and 1968-69.

=== Fruitcake Bluff ===
71°33′S 160°29′E. A steep rock outcrop in the form of a bluff 100 metres (330 ft) high, extending in a northeast–southwest direction for 1 mile (1.6 km) in the southeast portion of Thompson Spur, Daniels Range. Recorded by USARP geologists C.C. Plummer and R.S. Babcock, who made a geological reconnaissance of Daniels Range in December 1981. Descriptively named from the prevalent intrusive rock on the bluff which has the appearance in color and texture of a fruitcake.

=== Schroeder Spur ===
71°38′S 160°30′E. A large mountain spur lying south of Edwards Glacier and the parallel Thompson Spur, at the south end of Daniels Range, Usarp Mountains. Mapped by USGS from surveys and U.S. Navy air photos, 1960-63. Named by US-ACAN for Lauren A. Schroeder, USARP biologist at McMurdo Station, 1967-68.

=== Mount McKenny ===
71°40′S 160°22′E. A mountain (1,890 m) at the south end of Daniels Range, 4 miles (6.4 km) southeast of Mount Toogood, in the Usarp Mountains. Mapped by USGS from surveys and U.S. Navy air photos, 1960-63. Named by US-ACAN for Clarence D. McKenny, USARP meteorologist who wintered at the South Pole Station in 1959 and 1961, and at Eights Station in 1963.

== Sources ==
- Alberts, Fred G., ed. (1995), Geographic Names of the Antarctic (PDF) (2 ed.), United States Board on Geographic Names This article incorporates public domain material from websites or documents of the United States Board on Geographic Names.
- Daniels Range, USGS United States Geologic Survey
- Faure, Gunter; Mensing, Teresa M. (2010), The Transantarctic Mountains: Rocks, Ice, Meteorites and Water, Springer Science & Business Media
- Plummer, C.C.; Babcock, R.S.; Sheraton, J.W.; Adams, C.J.D.; Oliver, R.L. (1983), "Geology of the Daniels Range, Northern Victoria Land, Antarctica: A Preliminary Report", in R. L. Oliver; P. R. James; J. B. Jago (eds.), Antarctic Earth Science, Cambridge University Press
- Pomerantz Tableland, USGS United States Geologic Survey
