= Monument Nunataks =

Nunataks in Victoria Land, Antarctica

- Location within Antarctica

Geography
- Continent: Antarctica
- Region(s): Victoria Land, Antarctica
- Range coordinates: 72°35′S 162°15′E

The Monument Nunataks (72°35′S 162°15′E) are a group of nunataks in Antarctica that have numerous pinnacles and odd-shaped projections resembling monuments, situated north of Sculpture Mountain in the upper part of Rennick Glacier. The group was named by the Northern Party of the New Zealand Geological Survey Antarctic Expedition (NZGSAE) of 1962–63.

== Location ==
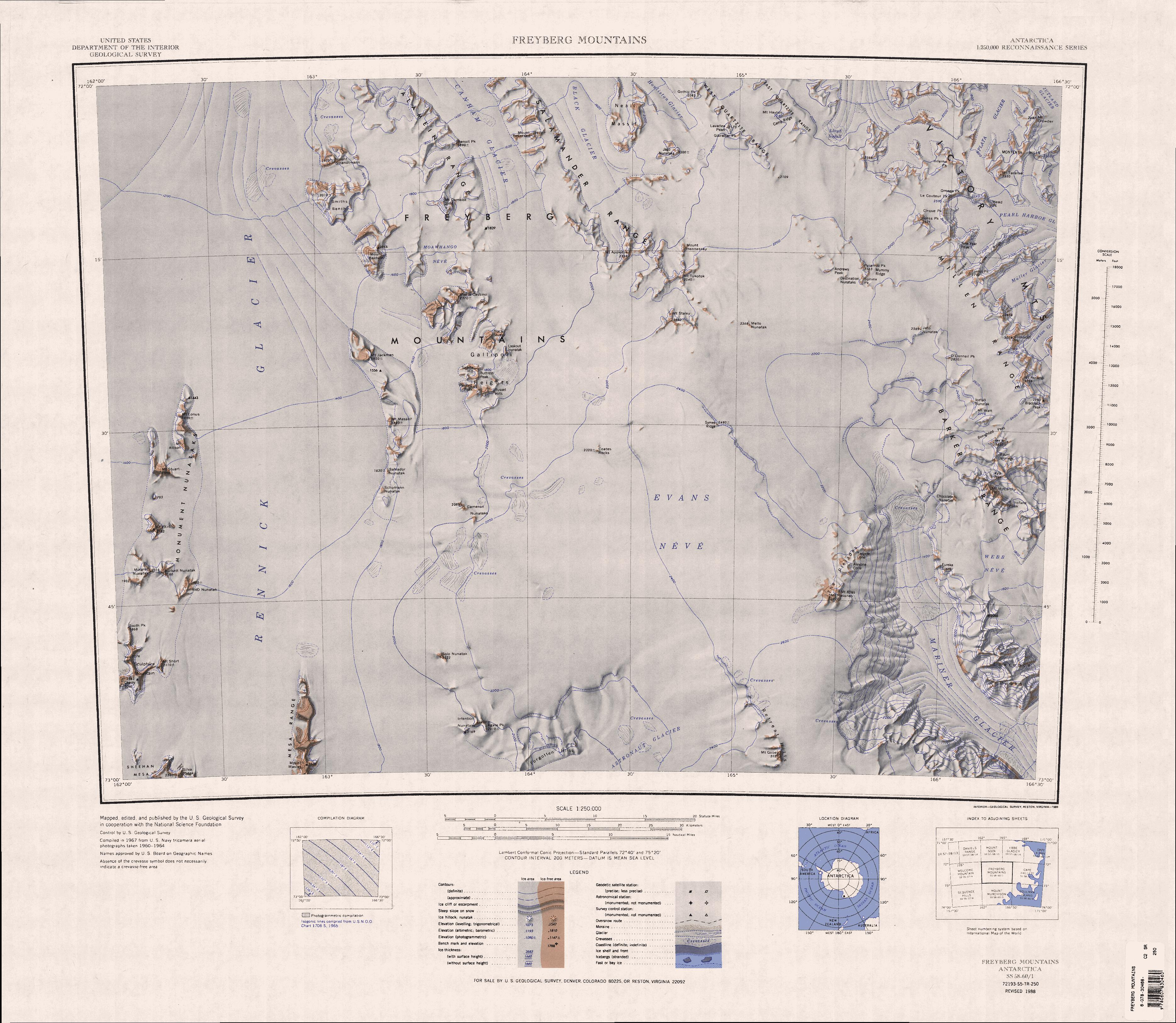
Monument Nunataks in southwest

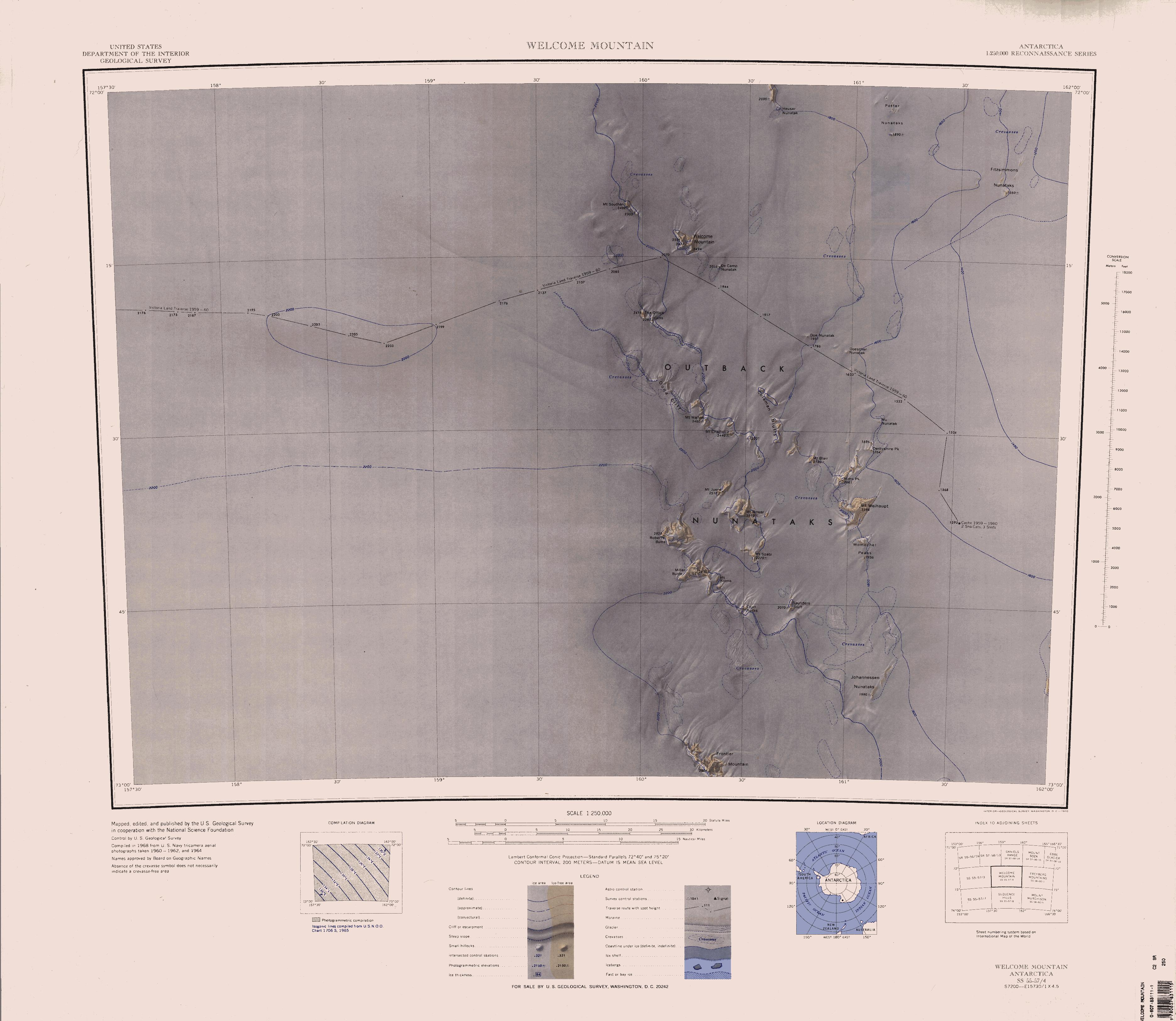
Terrain to the west of Monument Nunataks

The Monument Nunataks are on the east side of the upper Rennick Glacier. The Freyberg Mountains are to the east, and the Mesa Range to the south. the Outback Nunataks are to the west.

== Features ==
Features, from north to south, include:

=== Mount Lorius ===
72°28′S 162°21′E. A mountain, 1,690 metres (5,540 ft) high, standing 2.5 nautical miles (4.6 km; 2.9 mi) north of Mount Allison. Mapped by the United States Antarctic Research Program (USARP) Victoria Land Traverse Party, 1959-60. Named by the United States Advisory Committee on Antarctic Names (US-ACAN) for Claude Lorius, French glaciologist, a member of the traverse party.

=== Mount Allison ===
72°31′S 162°22′E. A mountain 3 nautical miles (5.6 km; 3.5 mi) northeast of Mount Stuart. Mapped by the United States Geological Survey (USGS) from surveys and United States Navy air photos, 1960-64. Named by the US-ACAN for Richard G. Allison, biologist at McMurdo Station, summers 1965-66 and 1967-68.

=== Mount Stuart ===
72°33′S 162°15′E. A mountain, 1,995 metres (6,545 ft) high, standing 5 nautical miles (9.3 km; 5.8 mi) north of Mount VX-6. Named by the US-ACAN for A.W. Stuart, glaciologist and member of the United States ArmyRP Victoria Land Traverse Party which surveyed this area in 1959-60.

=== Mount VX-6 ===
72°38′S 162°12′E. A distinctive, sharp mountain, 2,185 metres (7,169 ft) high, standing 4 nautical miles (7.4 km; 4.6 mi) north of Minaret Nunatak. Surveyed by the USARP Victoria Land Traverse Party, 1959-60. They named it for United States Navy Air Development Squadron Six (VX-6) which supported the traverse party in the field. On January 1, 1969, the squadron was redesignated Antarctic Development Squadron Six (VXE-6) but its mission remained the same.

=== Minaret Nunatak ===
72°42′S 162°10′E. A minaret-like nunatak, 2,115 metres (6,939 ft) high, standing 1 nautical mile (1.9 km; 1.2 mi) west of Burkett Nunatak. Named by the Northern Party of NZGSAE, 1962-63.

=== Burkett Nunatak ===
72°42′S 162°14′E. A nunatak, 2,180 metres (7,150 ft) high, standing 1 nautical mile (1.9 km; 1.2 mi) east of Minaret Nunatak. Mapped by USGS from surveys and United States Navy air photos, 1960-64. Named by US-ACAN for Willis A. Burkett, aviation electronics technician of United States Navy Squadron VX-6. Burkett made six deployments with Deep Freeze expeditions and participated in over 100 flights to McMurdo Sound.

=== R4D Nunatak ===
72°44′S 162°21′E. A nunatak lying 2 nautical miles (3.7 km; 2.3 mi) southeast of Burkett Nunatak, at the southeast end of Monument Nunataks. Named by the Northern Party of NZGSAE, 1962-63, after the R4D "Dakota" aircraft used by the United States Navy to transport the Northern Party to this area, and to resupply and return the party to Scott Base.

== Nearby features ==
=== Sculpture Mountain ===
72°51′S 162°05′E. A large dissected mountain between the Monument Nunataks and Sheehan Mesa. Named by the Northern Party of NZGSAE, 1962-63, due to the cuspate embayment which has been sculptured into the feature.

=== Tooth Peak ===
72°47′S 162°03′E. A small sharp peak on the north end of Sculpture Mountain in the upper Rennick Glacier. Named for its tooth-like shape by the Northern Party of NZGSAE, 1962-63.

=== Mount Short ===
72°50′S 162°13′E. A mountain, 2,110 metres (6,920 ft) high, standing 1 nautical mile (1.9 km; 1.2 mi) east of Sculpture Mountain. Mapped by USGS from surveys and United States Navy air photos, 1960-64. Named by US-ACAN for Lieutenant Commander John S. Short, United States Navy, LC-130F aircraft commander in Operation Deep Freeze 1967 and 1968.

=== Cherry Spur ===
72°52′S 162°00′E. A prominent rock spur that forms the southwest portion of Sculpture Mountain at the south end of Monument Nunataks. The feature was geologically studied by Ohio State University field parties in the 1981-82 and 1982-83 seasons. Named by the US-ACAN after Eric M. Cherry, geologist with those parties who worked on the spur.

== Sources ==
- Alberts, Fred G., ed. (1995), Geographic Names of the Antarctic (PDF) (2 ed.), United States Board on Geographic Names This article incorporates public domain material from websites or documents of the United States Board on Geographic Names.
- Freyburg Mountains, USGS: United States Geographic Board
- Welcome Mountain, USGS: United States Geographic Board

This article incorporates public domain material from websites or documents of the United States Geological Survey.
