= Martin A. Pomerantz =

American physicist (1916–2008)

- Born: December 17, 1916; New York, New York, USA
- Died: October 26, 2008 (aged 91); San Rafael, California, USA
- Education: Syracuse University (B.A. 1937); University of Pennsylvania (M.S. 1938); Temple University (Ph.D. 1951)
- Known for: Antarctic astronomy
- Awards: NASA Distinguished Science Achievement Award
- Scientific career
- Fields: Physics
- Workplaces: Bartol Research Institute

Martin Arthur Pomerantz (December 17, 1916 – October 26, 2008) was an American physicist who served as director of the Bartol Research Institute and who had been a leader in developing Antarctic astronomy. When the astronomical observatory at the United States Amundsen–Scott South Pole Station was opened in 1995, it was named the Martin A. Pomerantz Observatory (MAPO) in his honor. Pomerantz published his scientific autobiography, Astronomy on Ice, in 2004.

== Life ==
Pomerantz was born and raised in New York City, and graduated from Manual Training High School in Brooklyn. In 1937, Pomerantz received an A.B. in physics from Syracuse University. He received an M.S. from the University of Pennsylvania in 1938. In 1938, Pomerantz joined the Bartol Research Foundation, where he spent nearly his entire career. He became a permanent member of the foundation's scientific staff in 1943. In 1951, he received his Ph.D. in physics from Temple University for a thesis based on his extensive scientific work at Bartol. In 1959, Pomerantz became the second director of the foundation, replacing W. F. G. Swann upon the latter's retirement.

In 1977, Pomerantz presided over the foundation's move from its original location at Swarthmore College to its present location at the University of Delaware. Despite Pomerantz' efforts, Swarthmore had decided not to renew its 50-year contract with Bartol; there had been a number of conflicts during its decades of residence at Swarthmore. The Foundation was renamed the Bartol Research Institute following the move to Delaware. Pomerantz stepped down as the institute's president in 1987; he was replaced as president by Norman F. Ness. In 1990, Pomerantz retired, becoming a professor emeritus at the Institute and at the University of Delaware.

Pomerantz had served on the board of trustees for the Franklin Institute and edited the Journal of the Franklin Institute. He had also served on the editorial board for Space Science Reviews. Pomerantz' scientific papers and documents have been archived at the American Institute of Physics and at the University of Delaware.

== Cosmic ray research ==
Pomerantz was one of the pioneers in balloon-borne cosmic ray research in the 1940s and 1950s. The initial work was done at the Bartol Institute near Philadelphia. However, the large majority of cosmic rays are charged particles, and the Earth's magnetic field strongly affects the paths of these cosmic rays. Since the Earth's magnetic field varies significantly with latitude, Pomerantz led a number of expeditions measuring cosmic rays from sites at varying latitudes around the Earth. Several of these expeditions were sponsored by the National Geographic Society. He supervised the installation of a stationary cosmic ray detector facility at Thule Air Base in Greenland, and in 1960 Pomerantz installed a cosmic ray detector at McMurdo Station in Antarctica. Pomerantz' experiments at the South Pole commenced in 1964.

These experiments and expeditions led to several insights, one of which was an inference about the magnetic field of the Sun. Like the Earth, the Sun has a magnetic field. Initial estimates suggested that the Sun's magnetic strength was about fifty times that of the Earth. The cosmic ray experiments indicated that the Sun's magnetic strength was of the same magnitude as the Earth's; this result is now well-established by many subsequent measurements. The work on the magnetic field of the Sun was featured in a 1949 article in Time magazine.

In 1971, Pomerantz published Cosmic Rays, which is a semipopular book that describes cosmic ray observations and the scientific understanding of their origins.

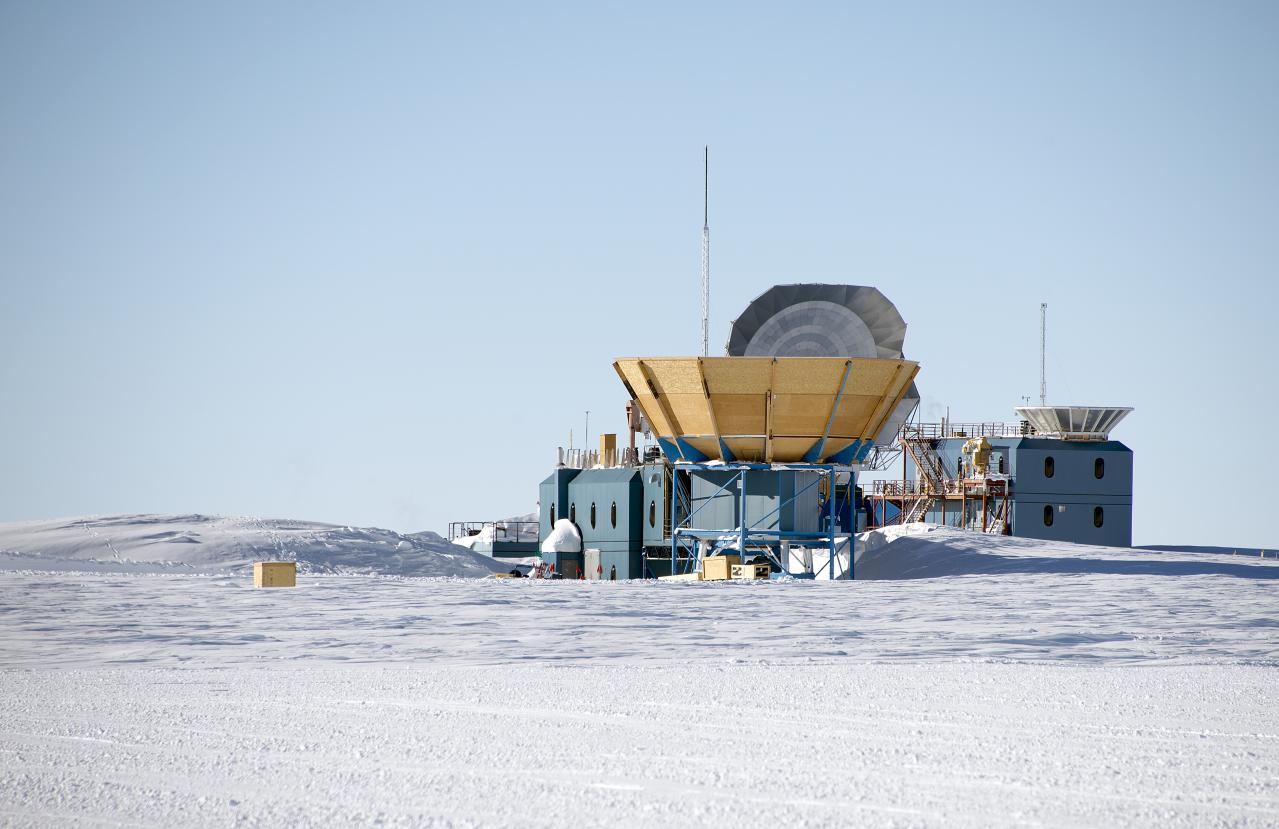
The Martin A. Pomerantz Observatory (foreground) and Dark Sector Laboratory (background) at Amundsen–Scott South Pole Station.

== Antarctic astronomy and astrophysics ==
Pomerantz saw the potential of the South Pole as an observing platform remarkably early. Its proximity to the South magnetic pole of the Earth means that charged cosmic rays can be detected there without the deflections they experience when detected at lower latitudes. Astronomical observations near the Earth's poles can be done over long periods, without the diurnal variations at lower latitudes. The South Pole is at an altitude of nearly 3,000 metres (9,800 ft), so the astronomical seeing should be comparable to other high-altitude observatories; the extreme cold in Antarctica also corresponds to relatively little water vapor in the atmosphere there, which is a particular advantage for infrared astronomy. Finally, the South Pole lies at the top of a very deep, nearly permanent ice sheet that has been used to advantage in experiments such as the IceCube Neutrino Detector.

Pomerantz' own research is particularly noted for his development of helioseismology, which is study of pressure waves in the Sun. In 1960, observations of the Sun revealed unexpected pulsations in the image. By 1975 it was becoming clear that these pulsations could be understood if the Sun was considered as an enormous bell ringing at very low frequencies (one oscillation per minute and lower), and that they provided important insight into the structure of the Sun.

In 1979, Pomerantz, along with Eric Fossat and Gerard Grec, conducted the first Antarctic observations by coupling a small telescope with a "sodium vapor resonance cell." The observations were not formally authorized; as Pomerantz later described it, "We had to find a way to convince people that the South Pole was the place for astronomy. Sometimes you need to circumvent the rules. Our bootleg experiment enabled us to obtain the clearest pictures of the sun that had ever been obtained from any place on earth. It proved once and for all this was a superb place for astronomy." Fossat, Grec, and Pomerantz were able to record the Sun's vibrations without interruption for more than 100 hours. Their results greatly extended the knowledge of the Sun's vibrational frequency spectrum, and they marked the beginning of an extensive astronomy program at the South Pole.

In 1995 the Martin A. Pomerantz Observatory was dedicated. In 1999, Norman F. Ness wrote that Pomerantz had "developed and operated instruments in Antarctica for observing similar sun-quake signals in the newly emerging field of helioseismology, a discipline in which he was one of the true pioneers." Pomerantz "also showed tremendous courage, working in Antarctica when it was still a very hazardous proposition."

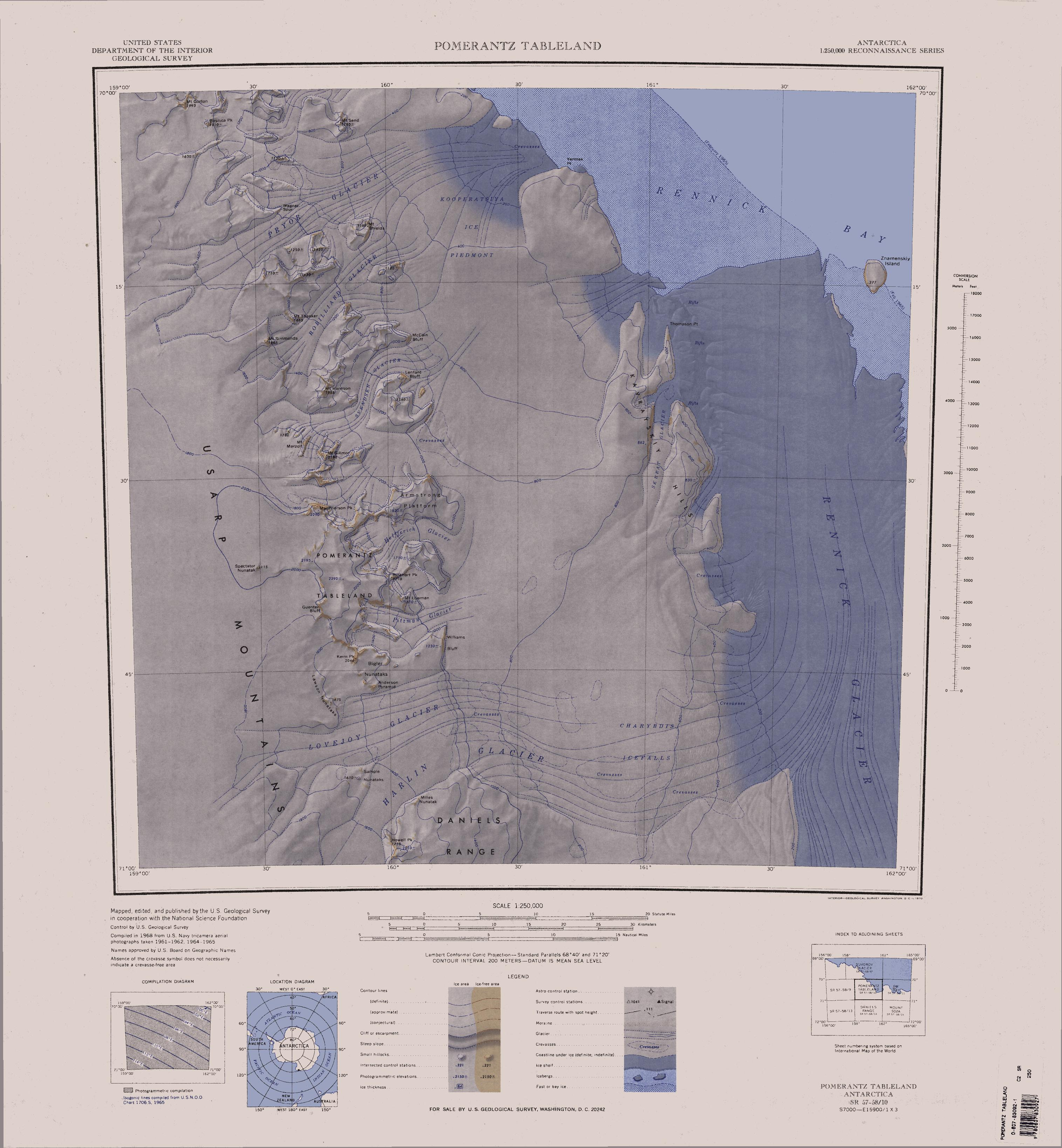
Topographic map of the Pomerantz Tableland in the Usarp Mountains of Antarctica.

== Honors ==
In 1970 Pomerantz received a Centennial Medal from Syracuse University. In 1985, Pomerantz was awarded the Prix de la Belgica. He received the Distinguished Public Servant Award from the National Science Foundation in 1987 and the NASA Exceptional Scientific Achievement Medal in 1990. The Pomerantz Tableland, in the Usarp Mountains of Antarctica, was named after him. In 1995, Pomerantz was honored in Antarctica with the dedication of an observatory bearing his name at the U.S. Amundsen–Scott South Pole Station. He had received honorary doctorates from Swarthmore College, University of Uppsala, University of Delaware, and Syracuse University. Pomerantz was a fellow of the American Physical Society, of the American Geophysical Union, and of the American Association for the Advancement of Science.
