= Emlen Peaks =

Mountains in Antarctica

- Location within Antarctica

Geography
- Range coordinates: 71°54′S 160°35′E

The Emlen Peaks (71°54′S 160°35′E) is a group of scattered peaks and nunataks, 16 miles (26 km) long and 7 miles (11 km) wide. It is 6 miles (9.7 km) south of Daniels Range in the south end of the Usarp Mountains in northern Victoria Land, Antarctica.

== Early exploration and name ==
Emlen Peaks was mapped by the United States Geological Survey (USGS) from surveys and United States Navy air photos in 1960–63. It was named by the Advisory Committee on Antarctic Names (US-ACAN) after John Thompson Emlen Jr. (1908–1997), a biologist from the University of Wisconsin. As a program leader he made penguin navigational studies on the Ross Ice Shelf, the interior of Victoria Land, and elsewhere in Antarctica in 1962–63.

== Glacier ==
=== Gressitt Glacier ===
71°30′S 161°15′E. A broad glacier, about 45 mi long, draining the area between Daniels Range and Emlen Peaks in the Usarp Mountains and flowing northeast to enter the Rennick Glacier just north of the Morozumi Range. Mapped by USGS from surveys and U.S. Navy air photos, 1960–63. Named by US-ACAN for biologist J. Linsley Gressitt, Program Director who made biological studies, particularly in the Ross Sea area, in six austral summers, 1959–60 to 1965–66.

== Features ==
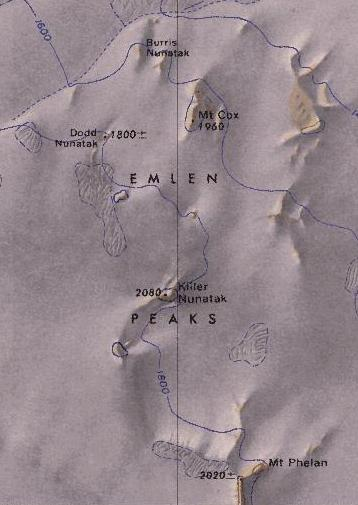
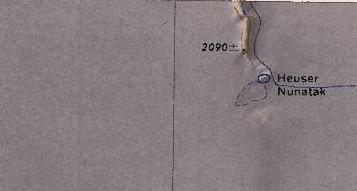
1:250,000 scale topographic map of the Emlen Peaks

Named features, from north to south:

=== Burris Nunatak ===
71°47′S 160°27′E. A nunatak near the north extremity of Emlen Peaks, 2 miles (3.2 km) northwest of Mount Cox, in the Usarp Mountains. Mapped by USGS from surveys and U.S. Navy air photos, 1960–63. Named by US-ACAN for James M. Burris, assistant to the USARP representative at McMurdo Station, 1967–68.

=== Mount Cox ===
71°50′S 160°32′E. A mountain (1,960 m) in the north-central part of Emlen Peaks, 5 miles (8.0 km) north of Killer Nunatak. Mapped by USGS from surveys and U.S. Navy air photos, 1960–63. Named by US-ACAN for Alien N. Cox, ADJ2, USN, crew chief in R4D (Skytrain) aircraft during 1962–63 in support of the USGS Topo East-West survey. Cox returned to the Antarctic in the 1963–64 and 1964–65 seasons.

=== Dodd Nunatak ===
71°50′S 160°24′E. A nunatak 2.5 mi W of Mount Cox in the northwest portion of Emlen Peaks in the Usarp Mountains. Mapped by USGS from surveys and U.S. Navy air photos, 1960–63. Named by US-ACAN for Walter H. Dodd of the Public Information Office, National Science Foundation, who worked at McMurdo Station in the 1966–67 and 1967-68 austral summers.

=== Killer Nunatak ===
71°54′S 160°28′E. A granite nunatak (2,080 m) near the center of the Emlen Peaks, 5 miles (8.0 km) northwest of Mount Phelen, in the Usarp Mountains. Named by the northern party of the NZGSAE, 1963–64, for its distinctive outline resembling the dorsal fin of a killer whale.

=== Mount Phelan ===
71°59′S 160°37′E. A mostly ice-free mountain (2,000 m) located 5 miles (8.0 km) southeast of Killer Nunatak in the south portion of Emlen Peaks, Usarp Mountains. Mapped by USGS from surveys and U.S. Navy air photos, 1960–63. Named by US-AC AN for Michael J. Phelan, geomagnetist/seismologist at South Pole Station, 1962; a member of the Byrd Traverse, 1963–64.

=== Heuser Nunatak ===
72°02′S 160°38′E. A small nunatak that lies 3 miles (4.8 km) south of Mount Phelen and marks the south extremity of the Emlen Peaks in the Usarp Mountains. Mapped by USGS from surveys and U.S. Navy air photos, 1959–64. Named by US-ACAN for Charles M. Heuser, biolab technician at McMurdo Station, 1966–67.

== Sources ==
- Alberts, Fred G., ed. (1995), Geographic Names of the Antarctic (PDF) (2 ed.), United States Board on Geographic Names This article incorporates public domain material from websites or documents of the United States Board on Geographic Names.
