= Morozumi Range =

Mountain range in Victoria Land, Antarctica

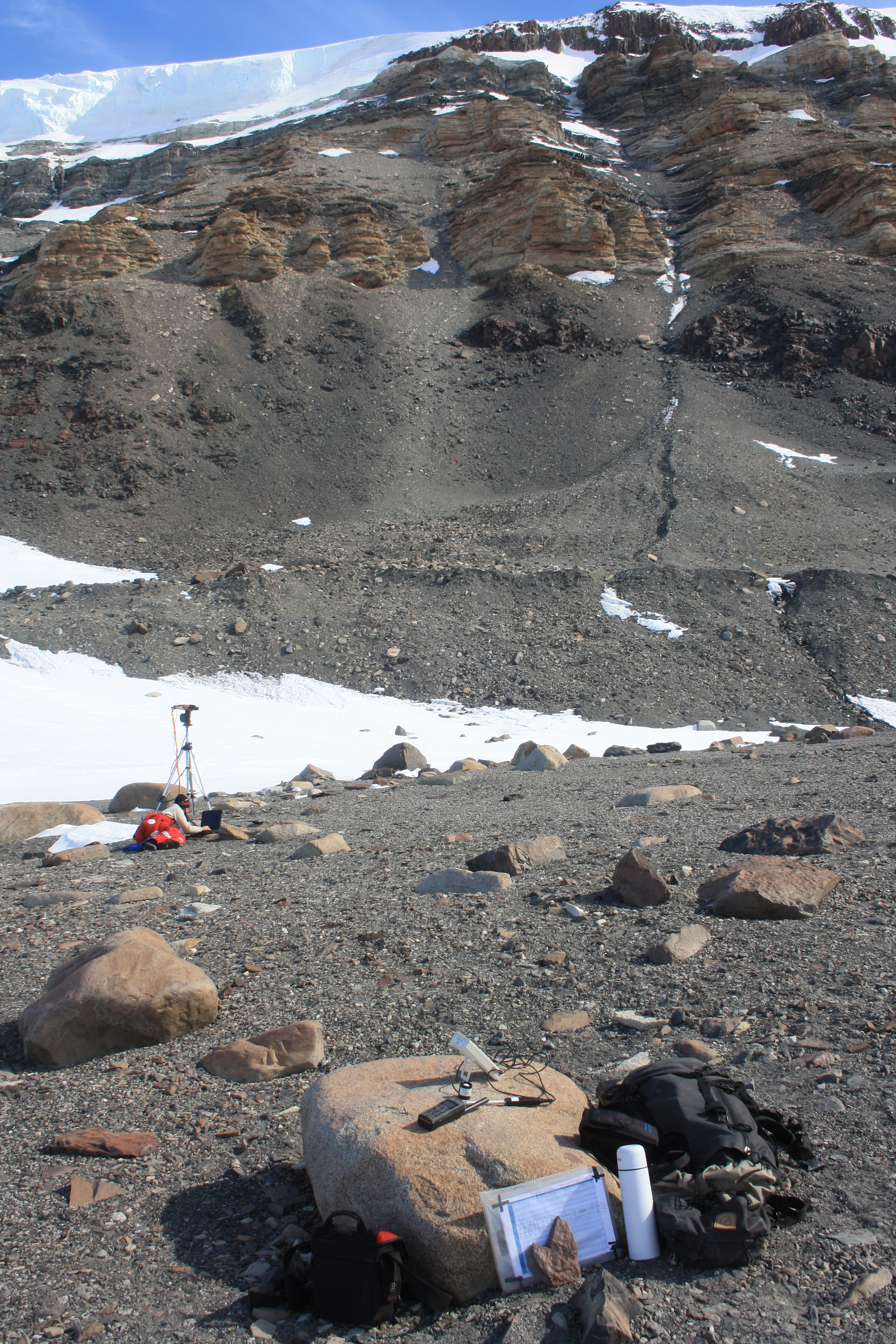
- Processing an alluvial fan in the range, 20 January 2016

Highest point
- Elevation: 1,466 m (4,810 ft)

Geography
- Location within Antarctica
- Range coordinates: 71°39′S 161°55′E

The Morozumi Range (71°39′S 161°55′E) is a mountain range in the Usarp Mountains of North Victoria Land, Antarctica. It extends northwest–southeast for 25 miles (40 km), with its northern elevations overlooking the convergence of Gressitt Glacier and Rennick Glacier.

== Early exploration and name ==
The Morozumi Range was mapped by the United States Geological Survey from surveys and United States Navy air photos in 1960–63. It was named by the Advisory Committee on Antarctic Names (US-ACAN) for Henry M. Morozumi, an aurora scientist at South Pole Station in 1960, and Station Scientific Leader at Byrd Station in 1963.

== Geology ==
The Morozumi Range is in the Rennick Graben, separated by the Rennick Faults from the Wilson Group rocks of the USARP mountains. Basement rocks are low-grade metasedimentary rocks that include greywacke-shale. The northern end holds the Adamellite Massif, a pluton of Granite Harbour Intrusives.

== Glaciers ==
=== Gressitt Glacier ===
71°30′S 161°15′E. A broad glacier, about 45 mi long, draining the area between Daniels Range and Emlen Peaks in the Usarp Mountains and flowing northeast to enter the Rennick Glacier just north of the Morozumi Range. Mapped by USGS from surveys and U.S. Navy air photos, 1960–63. Named by US-ACAN for biologist J. Linsley Gressitt, Program Director who made biological studies, particularly in the Ross Sea area, in six austral summers, 1959-60 to 1965-66.

=== Rennick Glacier ===
70°30′S 160°45′E. A broad glacier, nearly 200 miles (320 km) long, which is one of the largest in Antarctica. It rises on the polar plateau westward of Mesa Range and is 20 to 30 miles (32 to 48 km) wide, narrowing to 10 miles (16 km) near the coast. It takes its name from Rennick Bay where the glacier reaches the sea. The Rennick Glacier flows north between the east side of the Morozumi Range and the west side of the Lanterman Range.

== Features ==
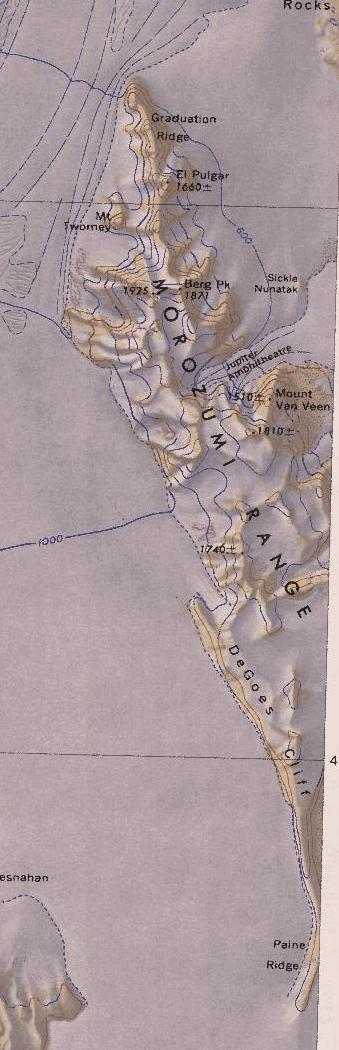
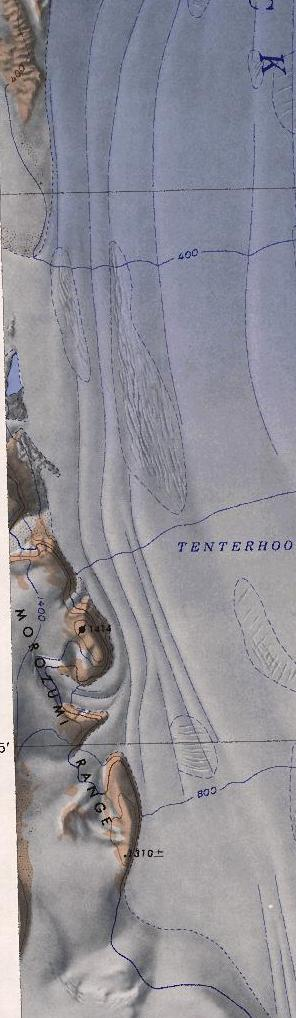
1:250,000 scale topographic maps of the Morozumi Range

Features from north to south are:

=== Graduation Ridge ===
71°28′S 161°44′E. A high rock ridge north of El Pulgar, forming the north extremity of Morozumi Range. Mapped by USGS from surveys and U.S. Navy air photos, 1960-63. The ridge was visited by NZGSAE, 1967–68, who gave the name because geologist J.A.S. Dow received his exam results here.

=== El Pulgar ===
71°29′S 161°46′E. A precipitous granite monolith, 1,660 metres (5,450 ft) high, standing 3 miles (4.8 km) north of Berg Peak in northern Morozumi Range. The feature was climbed by four members of NZGSAE, 1967-68, who gave the name El Pulgar (Spanish for "the thumb").

=== Mount Twomey ===
71°30′S 161°41′E. A somewhat detached peak over 120 metres (390 ft) high situated on the northwest margin of the Morozumi Range, 2.5 miles (4.0 km) northwest of Berg Peak. Mapped by USGS from surveys and U.S. Navy air photos, 1960-63. Named by US-ACAN for Arthur A. Twomey, USARP geologist at McMurdo Station, 1967-68 and 1968-69.

=== Sickle Nunatak ===
71°32′S 161°57′E. A nunatak at the north side of the entrance to Jupiter Valley, on the east side of the Morozumi Range. So named by members of the NZGSAE, 1967-68, because of its shape.

=== Berg Peak ===
71°32′S 161°47′E. A prominent peak, 1,870 metres (6,140 ft) high, standing 3 miles (4.8 km) south of El Pulgar in northern Morozumi Range. Mapped by USGS from surveys and U.S. Navy air photos, 1960–63. Named by US-ACAN for Thomas E. Berg, geologist who wintered at McMurdo Sound in 1961, and spent three succeeding summer seasons making patterned ground studies in the area. Berg perished in the crash of a U.S. Navy helicopter near Mount McLennan, Nov. 19, 1969.

=== Jupiter Amphitheatre ===
71°34′S 161°51′E. A steep-walled valley in eastern Morozumi Range. The valley is occupied by a glacier and is entered between Sickle Nunatak and Mount Van Veen. Mapped by USGS from surveys and U.S. Navy air photos, 1960-63. The name was applied by the NZGSAE during the 1967-68 season.

=== Mount Van Veen ===
71°35′S 161°54′E. A precipitous, mainly ice-free mountain rising to 1,510 metres (4,950 ft) at the south side of Jupiter Amphitheatre in the Morozumi Range. Mapped by USGS from surveys and U.S. Navy air photos, 1960-63. Named by US-ACAN for Richard C. Van Veen, USARP geologist at McMurdo Station, 1967-68.

=== DeGoes Cliff ===
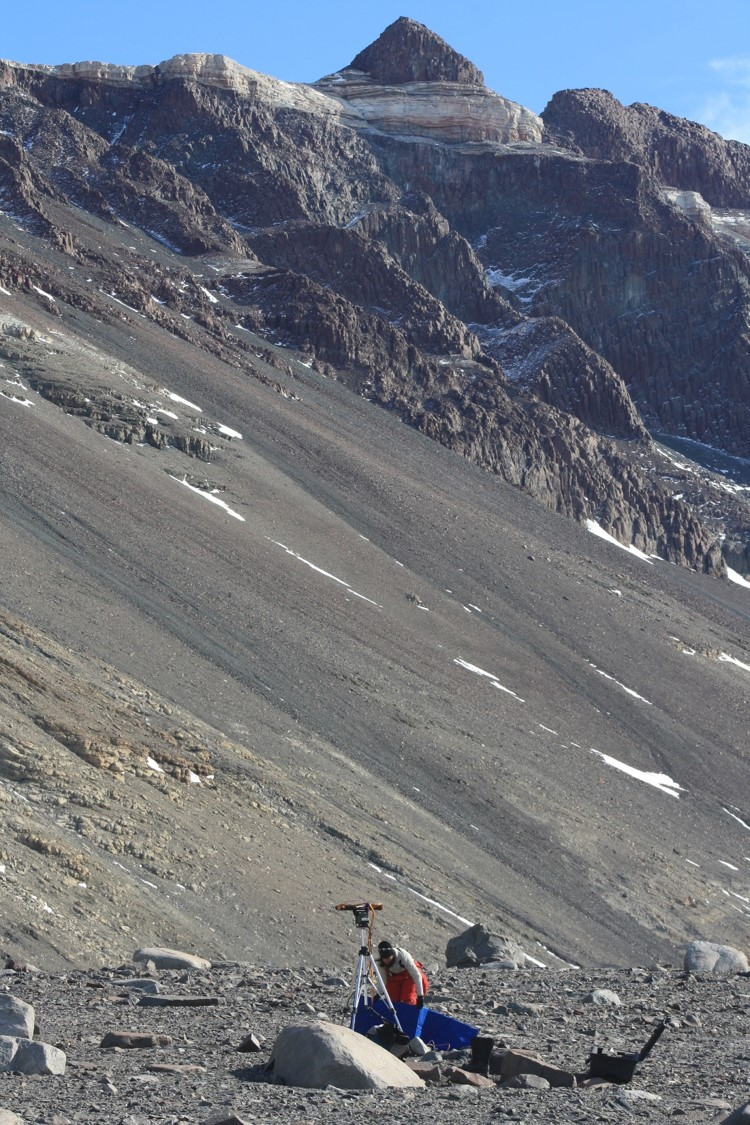
DeGoes Cliff 3 February 2016

71°44′S 161°54′E- A steep rock cliff on the west side of Morozumi Range. The cliff is over 6 miles (9.7 km) long. Its northern end is 6 miles (9.7 km) southwest of Mount Van Veen. Mapped by USGS from surveys and U.S. Navy air photos, 1960-63. Named by US-ACAN for Louis DeGoes of the National Academy of Sciences, Executive Secretary of the Committee on Polar Research, National Research Council.

=== Paine Ridge ===
71°50′S 162°00′E. A saber-shaped ridge largely composed of bare rock, extending southward from DeGoes Cliff at the SW end of the Morozumi Range. Mapped by USGS from surveys and U.S. Navy air photos, 1960-63. Named by US-ACAN for Roland D. Paine, Public Information Officer, National Science Foundation, who worked at McMurdo Station, 1960-61 and 1968-69.

== Sources ==
- Alberts, Fred G., ed. (1995), Geographic Names of the Antarctic (PDF) (2 ed.), United States Board on Geographic Names This article incorporates public domain material from websites or documents of the United States Board on Geographic Names.
- USGS United States Geological Survey (1968), Daniels Range
- Faure, Gunter; Mensing, Teresa M. (2010), The Transantarctic Mountains: Rocks, Ice, Meteorites and Water, Springer Science & Business Media, ISBN 9789048193905
- USGS United States Geological Survey (1967), Mount Soza
