= Usarp Mountains =

Mountain range in Antarctica

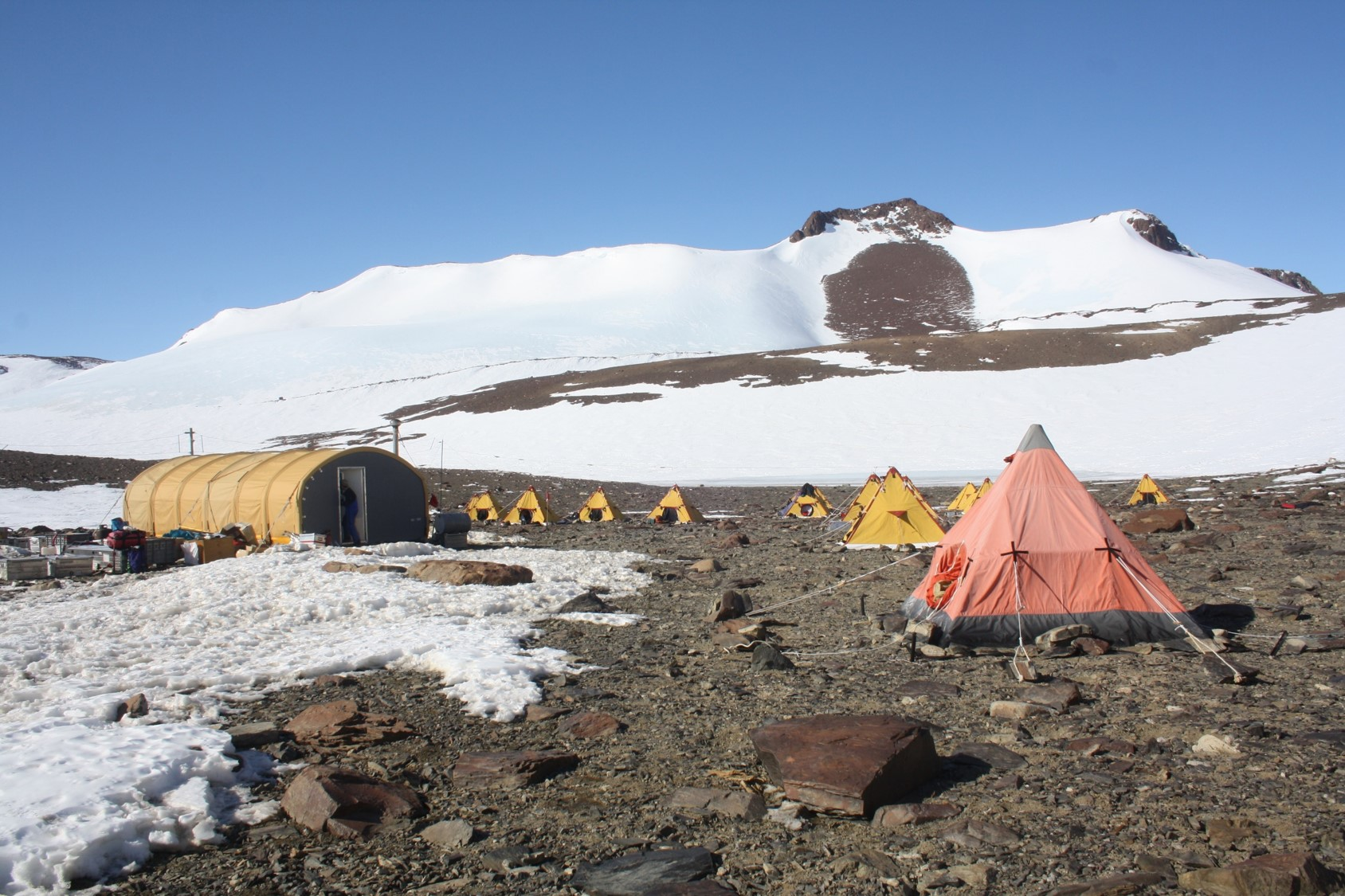
- Field camp in Helliwell Hills during GANOVEX 11 (2015/16)

Geography
- Location within Antarctica
- Location: Antarctica
- Region: North Victoria Land
- Range coordinates: 71°10′S 160°00′E

The Usarp Mountains are a major mountain range in North Victoria Land, Antarctica. They are west of the Rennick Glacier and trend north to south for about 190 kilometres (118 mi). The mountains are bounded to the north by Pryor Glacier and the Wilson Hills. They are west of the Bowers Mountains.

== Discovery and naming ==
These mountains were discovered and first photographed from aircraft of the U.S. Navy Operation Highjump in 1946. They were first sighted and entered by the U.S. Victoria Land Traverse 1959-1960 (VLT), and the first ascent of Mount Welcome was made by John G. Weihaupt, Alfred Stuart, Claude Lorius, and Arnold Heine of that traverse team. The mountains were completely mapped by the United States Geological Survey from VLT reports, U.S. Navy air photos from 1960–63, and subsequent surveys. The name is an acronym of the United States Antarctic Research Program (USARP), and was applied by Advisory Committee on Antarctic Names (US-ACAN) in recognition of the accomplishments of that program in Antarctica.

== Ranges ==
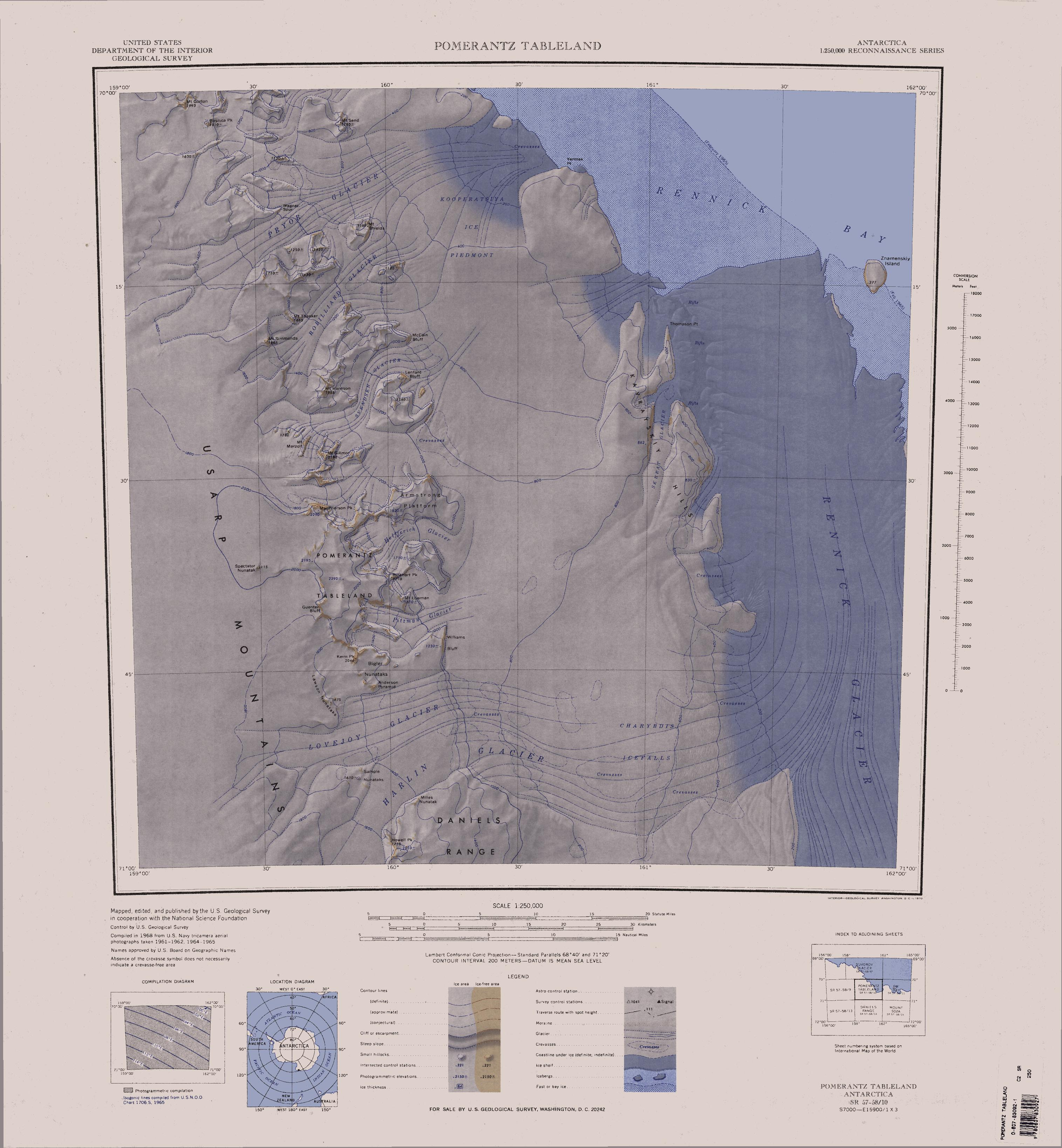
1:250,000 scale topographic map of the Pomerantz Tableland and the northern parts of the Usarp Mountains.

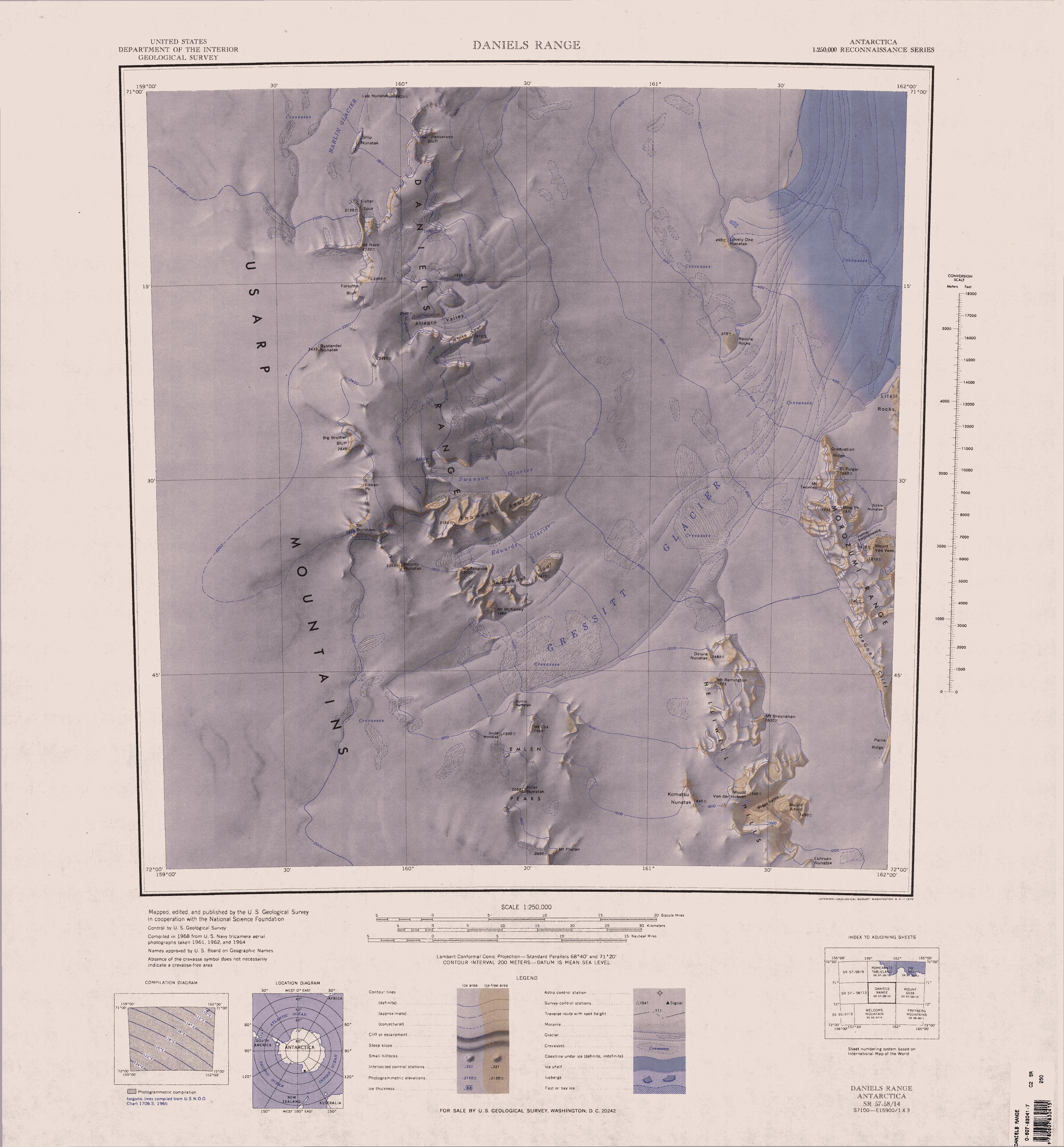
1:250,000 scale topographic map of the Daniels Range in the Usarp Mountains.

The important constituent parts of the Usarp Mountain include Pomerantz Tableland, Daniels Range, Emlen Peaks, Helliwell Hills and Morozumi Range.

=== Pomerantz Tableland ===
70°38′S 159°50′E. A high (2,290 m) ice-covered tableland about 10 mi long, standing 15 mi NW of Daniels Range. Mapped by USGS from surveys and U.S. Navy air photos, 1960-62. Named by US-ACAN for Martin A. Pomerantz, Director of the Barthol Research Foundation and Chairman of the U.S. Committee for the International Year of the Quiet Sun, who carried on cosmic ray studies in the McMurdo Sound area, 1959–60 and 1960-61. MacPherson Peak is on the northwest end of Pomerantz Tableland.

=== Daniels Range ===
71°15′S 160°00′E. The Daniels Range is a principal mountain range of the Usarp Mountains, about 80 km (50 mi) long and 16 km (10 mi) wide, bounded to the north by Harlin Glacier and to the south by Gressitt Glacier. The range was mapped by the United States Geological Survey (USGS) from surveys and United States Navy air photographs in 1960–63. It was named by the Advisory Committee on Antarctic Names (US-ACAN) after Ambassador Paul Clement Daniels (1903–86), a leading American figure in the formulation of the Antarctic Treaty in 1959.

=== Emlen Peaks ===
71°54′S 160°35′E. A group of scattered peaks and nunataks, 16 mi long and 7 mi wide, lying 6 mi south of Daniels Range in the south end of the Usarp Mountains. Mapped by USGS from surveys and U.S. Navy air photos, 1960-63. Named by US-ACAN after John T. Emlen, biologist, University of Wisconsin, program leader who made penguin navigational studies on the Ross Ice Shelf, the interior of Victoria Land, and elsewhere in Antarctica, 1962-63.

=== Helliwell Hills ===
71°50′S 161°25′E. A group of rocky hills and low mountains about 18 mi long and 9 mi wide. The hills lie south of Gressitt Glacier and midway between Emlen Peaks and the Morozumi Range. Mapped by USGS from surveys and U.S. Navy air photos, 1960-63. Named by US-ACAN for Robert A. Helliwell of Stanford University, Program Director for the USARP study of very low frequency (VLF) radio noise phenomena.

=== Morozumi Range ===
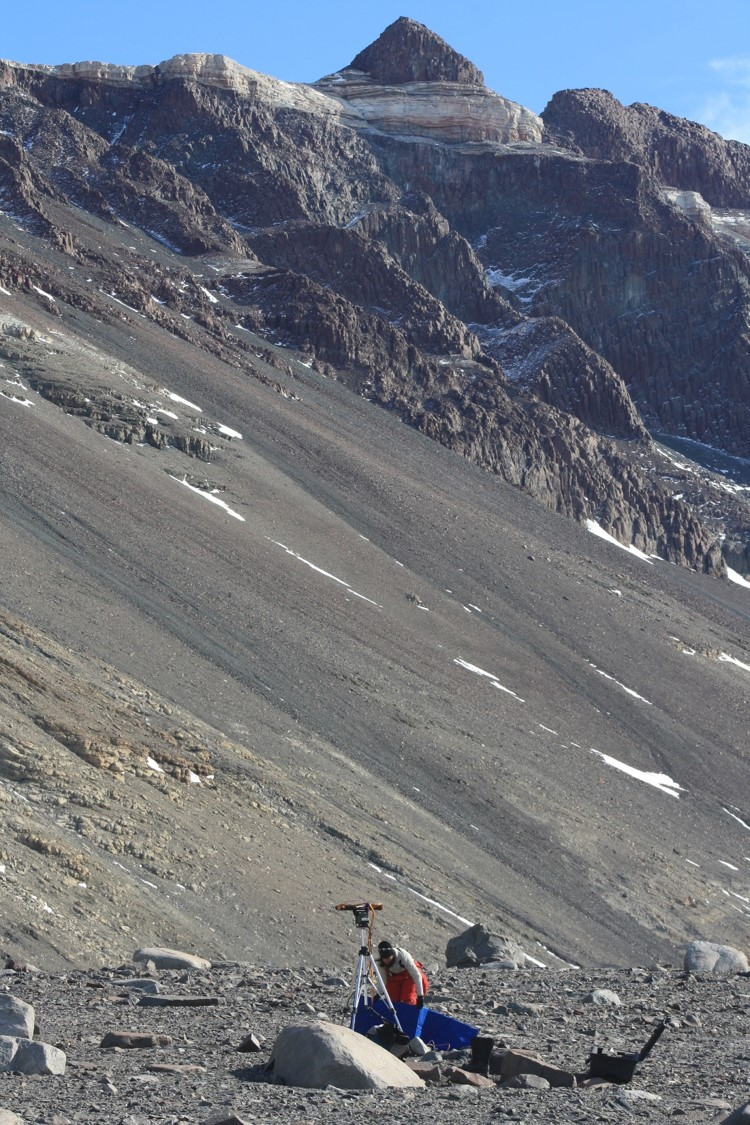
DeGoes in the Morozumi Range

71°39′S 161°55′E. A mountain range which extends northwest–southeast for 25 mils (0.64 mm). Its northern elevations overlook the convergence of the Gressitt and Rennick Glaciers. Mapped by USGS from surveys and U.S. Navy air photos, 1960-63. Named by US-ACAN for Henry M. Morozumi, aurora scientist at South Pole Station, 1960, and Station Scientific Leader at Byrd Station, 1963.

== Northern Peaks ==
Peaks to the north of Pomerantz Tableland and south of Pryor Glacier are:

=== Mount Gillmor ===
70°28′S 159°46′E. A largely ice-free mountain 2,185 metres (7,169 ft)} high at the south side of the head of Svendsen Glacier, in the Usarp Mountains. Mapped by USGS from surveys and U.S. Navy aerial photographs, 1960-62. Named by US-ACAN for C. Stewart Gillmor, U.S. Exchange Scientist (ionospheric physics) at the Soviet Mirnyy Station in 1961.

=== Mount Marzolf ===
70°28′S 159°41′E. An elongated partially ice-free mountain standing at the head of Svendsen Glacier, 2 miles (3.2 km) west of Mount Gillmor, in the Usarp Mountains. Mapped by USGS from surveys and U.S. Navy air photos, 1960-65. Named by US-ACAN for John E. Marzolf, USARP biologist at McMurdo Station, 1967-68.

=== Mount Harrison ===
70°23′S 159°46′E. A large mountain (1,955 m) which dominates the ridge separating the Robilliard and Svendsen Glaciers, in the Usarp Mountains. Named by US-ACAN for Louis J. Harrison, USA, helicopter mechanic in the field in support of the USGS surveys Topo North-South (1961–62) and Topo East-West (1962–63), the latter including the survey of this mountain.

=== McCain Bluff ===
70°19′S 160°5′E. A bold rock bluff at the north side of the mouth of Svendsen Glacier, in the Usarp Mountains of Antarctica. It was mapped by the United States Geological Survey from surveys and U.S. Navy air photos, 1960–62, and was named by the Advisory Committee on Antarctic Names for John C. McCain, a United States Antarctic Research Program biologist at McMurdo Station, 1967–68.

=== Mount Simmonds ===
1,885 metres (6,184 ft) 70°20′S 159°33′E
A mountain standing higher and next westward of Mount Theaker along the north side of #Robilliard Glacier. Surveyed in 1962-63 by USGS and in 1963-64 by New Zealand Geological Survey Antarctic Expedition (NZGSAE). Named by New Zealand Antarctic Place-Names Committee (NZ-APC) for G.A.E. Simmonds, New Zealand cartographer engaged in preparing final drawings of Antarctic maps, 1961-67.

=== Mount Theaker ===
1,685 metres (5,528 ft) 70°18′S 159°38′E. A mountain along the north wall of Robilliard Glacier, 3 mi NE of Mount Simmonds. Mapped by USGS from surveys and U.S. Navy aerial photographs, 1960-62. Named by US-ACAN for Paul R. Theaker, USARP biologist at McMurdo Station, 1967-68.

=== Mount Shields ===
1,170 metres (3,839 ft) 70°11′S 159°56′E
A mountain at the junction of the Pryor and Robilliard Glaciers, at the north end of the Usarp Mountains. Named by US-ACAN for Staff Sergeant James K. Shields, United States Marine Corps (USMC), assigned to U.S. Navy Squadron VX-6 in Antarctica, 1962–63 and 1963-64. During 1962, Shields served as navigator on aircraft in support of the USGS Topo West survey of this area.

== Sources ==
- Alberts, Fred G., ed. (1995), Geographic Names of the Antarctic (PDF) (2 ed.), United States Board on Geographic Names This article incorporates public domain material from websites or documents of the United States Board on Geographic Names.
- Daniels Range, USGS United States Geologic Survey
