= Crown Hills (Antarctica) =

Group of peaks and hills in Victoria Land, Antarctica

- Location within Antarctica

Geography
- Continent: Antarctica
- Region(s): Victoria Land, Antarctica
- Range coordinates: 71°48′S 163°57′E

The Crown Hills (71°48′S 163°57′E) are a group of peaks and hills forming the south-east part of the Lanterman Range in the Bowers Mountains of Victoria Land, Antarctica. Lying between Zenith Glacier and Gambone Peak, and including All Black Peak, they rise to a height of 2,000 metres (6,600 ft). The name was given by the New Zealand Antarctic Place-Names Committee (NZ-APC) in 1983, at the suggestion of geologist M.G. Laird, in association with nearby Coronet Peak.

== Location ==
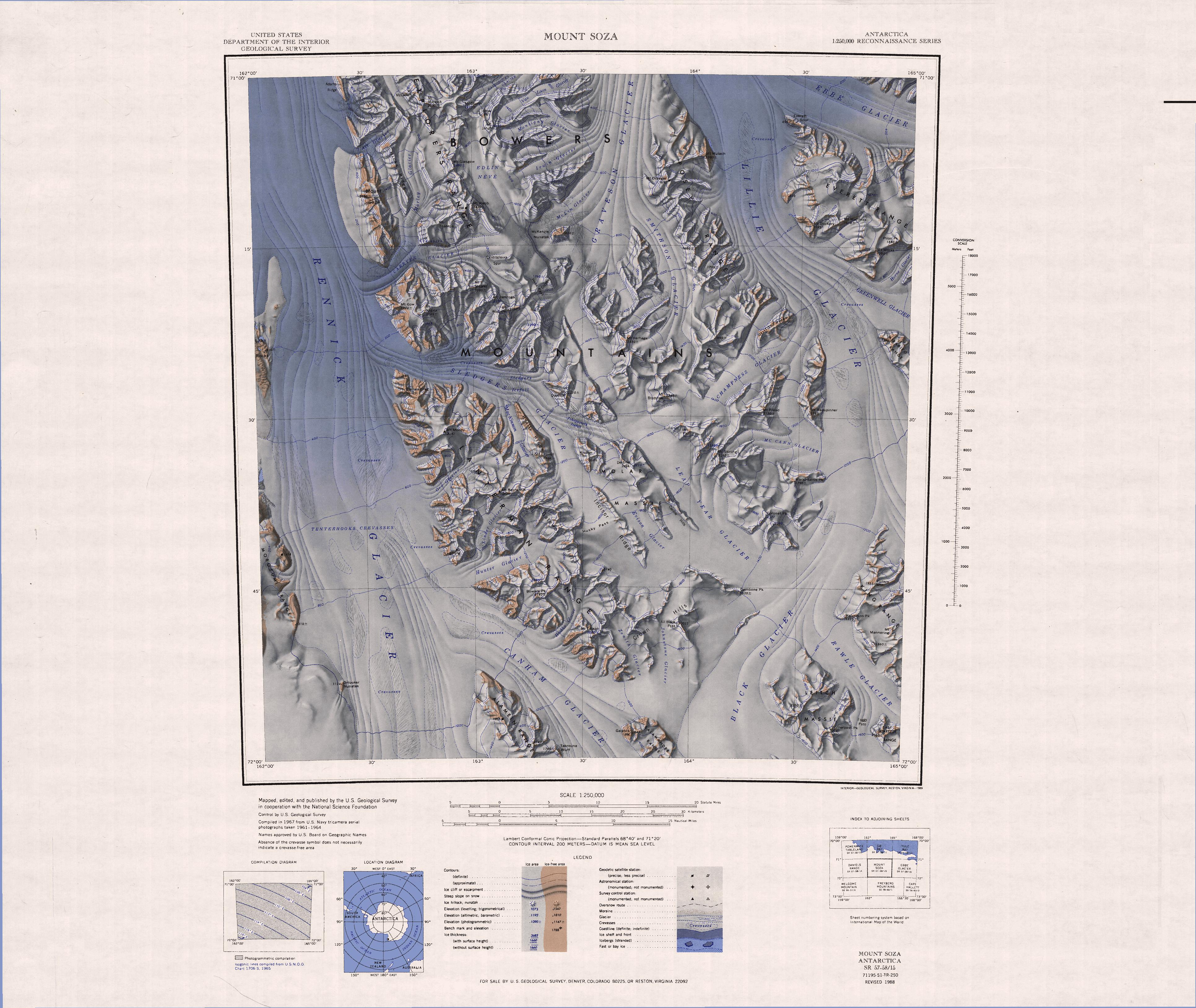
Mount Stirling towards the southeast of map

The Crown Hills are at the southeast end of the Lanterman Range. The Canham Glacier flows northwest along their southwest margin, and the Black Glacier flows northeast along their southeast margin. They are drained to the south by the Zenith Glacier and the Johnstone Glacier. The Molar Massif is to the north, the Alamein Range to the southwest and the Salamander Range to the south. The Leitch Massif and King Range are to the east.

== Features ==
=== Half Black Peak ===
71°47′S 163°40′E. A peak 2 nautical miles (3.7 km; 2.3 mi) ME of Mount Edixon, rising to over 2,000 metres (6,600 ft) high in the southeast part of Lanterman Range. Descriptively named in 1983 by the NZ-APC on the proposal of M.G. Laird, because of the proximity of All Black Peak and from the color of this peak, half black rock and half snow.

=== Mount Edixon ===
71°49′S 163°35′E. A mountain, 2,080 metres (6,820 ft) high, located 6 nautical miles (11 km; 6.9 mi) southeast of Bowers Peak in the Lanterman Range. Named by the northern party of New Zealand Geological Survey Antarctic Expedition (NZGSAE), 1963–64, for Lieutenant James R. Edixon, pilot with United States Navy Squadron VX-6, who, with considerable willingness and skill, was responsible for the expedition's air support.

=== Zenith Glacier ===
71°52′S 163°45′E. A glacier which lies 1 nautical mile (1.9 km; 1.2 mi) west of Johnstone Glacier and drains south from the south end of Lanterman Range, Bowers Mountains. So named by the NZGSAE to northern Victoria Land, 1967–68, because the glacier is an important geological outcrop area with an impressive view from the top (the head of the glacier) over much of the Bowers Mountains.

=== Johnstone Glacier ===
71°52′S 163°53′E. A small glacier located 1 nautical mile (1.9 km; 1.2 mi) east of Zenith Glacier, draining from the south extremity of Lanterman Range, Bowers Mountains. Named by the NZGSAE to northern Victoria Land, 1967–68, for lan Johnstone, chief scientific officer at Scott Base that season.

=== All Black Peak ===
71°48′S 163°57′E. The main peak in Crown Hills, rising to 2,025 metres (6,644 ft) high on the east side of the head of Johnstone Glacier. Descriptively named by the NZ-APC in 1983 on the suggestion of geologist M.G. Laird.

=== Gambone Peak ===
71°45′S 164°14′E. A peak, 1,620 metres (5,310 ft) high, located 7 nautical miles (13 km; 8.1 mi) southwest of Coronet Peak, at the junction of the Leap Year Glacier and Black Glacier. Mapped by United States Geological Survey (USGS) from surveys and United States Navy air photos, 1960-64. Named by United States Advisory Committee on Antarctic Names (US-ACAN) for Lieutenant (j.g) J.C. Gambone, Operations Administrative Assistant on the staff of the Commander, United States Naval Support Force. Antarctica, 1967 and 1968.

== Nearby features ==
Nearby features to the north in the Lanterman Range include:

=== Hoshko Glacier ===
71°49′S 163°24′E. A cirque-type glacier draining southwest from between Bowers Peak and Mount Edixon into the lower part of Canham Glacier. Mapped by USGS from surveys and United States Navy air photos, 1960-64. Named by US-ACAN for Lieutenant John Hoshko, Jr., United States Navy Reserve, public affairs officer on the staff of the Commander, United States Navy Support Force, Antarctica', 1966-68.

=== Bowers Peak ===
71°45′S 163°20′E. A peak, 2,140 metres (7,020 ft) high, forming a part of the divide between the Hunter Glacier and Hoshko Glacier. Named by the northern party of NZGSAE, 1963–64, for Lieutenant John M. Bowers, Jr., of United States Navy Squadron VX-6, who flew support flights for this New Zealand field party.

== Sources ==
- Alberts, Fred G., ed. (1995), Geographic Names of the Antarctic (PDF) (2 ed.), United States Board on Geographic Names This article incorporates public domain material from websites or documents of the United States Board on Geographic Names.
- Mount Soza, USGS: United States Geographic Board

This article incorporates public domain material from websites or documents of the United States Geological Survey.
