= Painted Peak (Russet Hills) =

Mountain in Antarctica

Coordinates: 72°27′S 163°45′E

Painted Peak is a peak rising from the north part of Russet Hills in the Gallipoli Heights, Freyberg Mountains. Descriptively named by the New Zealand Antarctic Place-Names Committee (NZ-APC) on the proposal of P.J. Oliver, New Zealand Antarctic Research Program (NZARP) geologist who studied the feature, 1981–82. Ignimbrite and dacite breccia cut by dikes of andesite and dacite give the peak many colors.
