= Reilly Ridge =

Reilly Ridge (71°32′S 163°18′E) is a prominent rock ridge about 7 nautical miles (13 km) long on the northeast side of Lanterman Range, Bowers Mountains, Antarctica. The ridge descends from the heights just east of Mount Bernstein and forms a part of the southwest wall of Sledgers Glacier. Mapped by United States Geological Survey (USGS) from ground surveys and U.S. Navy air photos, 1960–62. Named by Advisory Committee on Antarctic Names (US-ACAN) for Commander Joseph L. Reilly, U.S. Navy, officer in charge of the winter support party at McMurdo Station. 1964.

Reilly Ridge consists of pervasively folded, faulted, and otherwise deformed Cambrian sedimentary and metasedimentary rocks of the Glasgow, Molar, Spurs, and Reilly Formations. Despite the degree of tectonic deformation of these strata, identifiable Middle and Late Cambrian fossils, including numerous species of trilobites, have been found in exposures of Molar and Spurs Formation on Reilly Ridge. Given that early Paleozoic strata of Victoria Land are typically lacking in identifiable fossils, fossils from Reilly Ridge have been essential to the processes of reconstructing regional prehistoric paleoenvironments, correlating strata, and understanding ancient plate movements in Antarctica.

== See also ==
- Centropleura Spur
- Eureka Spurs
