= Centropleura Spur =

Mountain massif in Antarctica

Centropleura Spur (71°17′S 163°11′E) is the southwest spur of a small massif enclosing a cirque, located at the head of Carryer Glacier, 3 nautical miles (6 km) northeast of Mount Jamroga, in the Bowers Mountains, a major mountain range lying within Victoria Land, Antarctica. The geographical feature lies situated on the Pennell Coast, a portion of Antarctica lying between Cape Williams and Cape Adare. This spur was the first discovery of Cambrian fossils in this part of Antarctica.

== Paleontology ==
Centropleura Spur consists of the deeply eroded and steeply dipping strata of the Camp Ridge Quartzite and Spurs Formation. Scientific parties visiting this area in 1974–75 and 1981–82 found rare identifiable specimens of the eponymous Middle Cambrian trilobite, Centropleura, and other fossils in an outcrop of the Spurs Formation on Centropleura Spur.

== See also ==
- Eureka Spurs
- Reilly Ridge
