= Buttress Peak =

Buttress Peak may refer to:

- Buttress Peak (Gallipoli Heights), a peak in the Gallipoli Heights, Antarctica
- Buttress Peak (Queen Alexandra Range), a peak in the Queen Alexandra Range, Anrtarctica
