= Eureka Spurs =

The Eureka Spurs (72°42′S 166°0′E) are several rock spurs exposed along the east side of the head of Mariner Glacier, 8 nautical miles (15 km) southwest of Mount McCarthy, in Victoria Land. They were so named, after the ancient Greek word eureka, by the Victoria University of Wellington Antarctic Expedition field party to Evans Neve, 1971–72, on the occasion of fossil discoveries made in the area.

Thick sections of sedimentary strata of the Spurs Formation are exposed in Eureka Spurs. These outcrops exposed Cambrian submarine channel-fills in the Spurs Formation that exhibit unique meter-scale sedimentary cyclic layers of breccia and diamictite. In addition, these outcrops have yielded rare, identifiable fossils, including trilobites, that typically are absent in lower Paleozoic sedimentary strata in Victoria Land.

== See also ==
- Centropleura Spur
- Reilly Ridge
