= Gallipoli Heights =

Mountain range in Victoria Land, Antarctica

- Location within Antarctica

Geography
- Continent: Antarctica
- Region(s): Victoria Land, Antarctica
- Range coordinates: 72°26′S 163°48′E

The Gallipoli Heights (72°26′S 163°48′E) are a group of peaks and ridges centered 7.5 nautical miles (13.9 km; 8.6 mi) south-southeast of Monte Cassino, in the Freyberg Mountains of Victoria Land, Antarctica. They were named in association with Lord Freyberg and the nearby Freyberg Mountains by the Northern Party of the New Zealand Geological Survey Antarctic Expedition (NZGSAE), 1963–64.

== Location ==
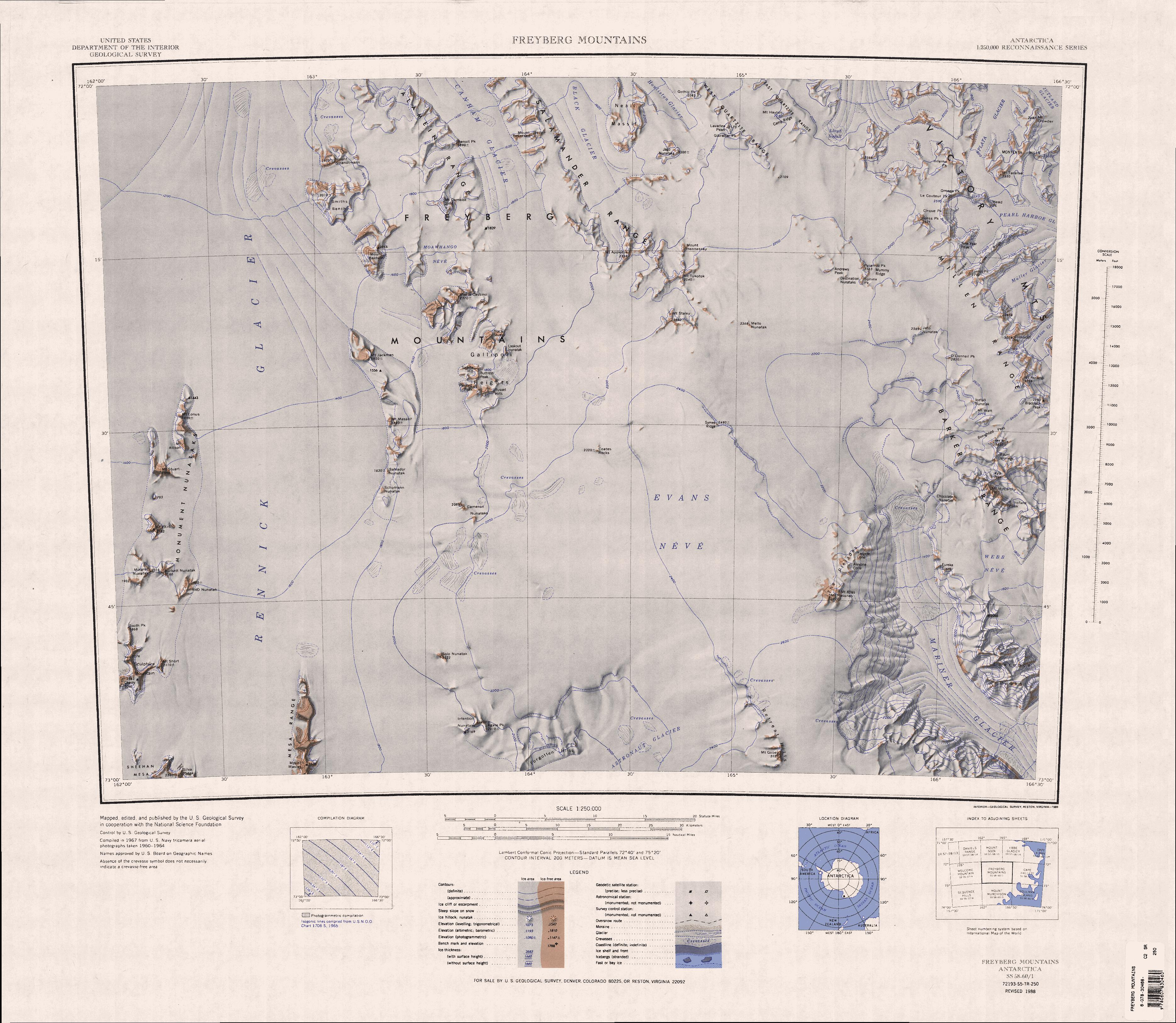
Gallipolli Heights west of center

The Gallipoli Heights are in the south of the Freyberg Mountains, to the south of Monte Cassino, the Moawhango Névé and the Alamein Range. The Salamander Range is to the northeast, Evans Névé is to the southeast and south, and the Rennick Glacier is to the west. There are various isolated peaks and nunataks rising from the ice around the Gallipoli Heights.

== Features ==
=== Saddle Hill ===
72°25′S 163°45′E. A small saddle-shaped table rising from the east end of the northern ridge of the Gallipoli Heights. The name is descriptive of the appearance of the hill when viewed from the north. Named by the New Zealand Antarctic Place-Names Committee (NZ-APC) on the proposal of P.J. Oliver, New Zealand Antarctic Research Programme (NZARP) geologist who studied the hill, 1981-82.

=== Buttress Peak ===
72°26′S 163°45′E. A peak at the east end of the central ridge of the Gallipoli Heights. The descriptive name was suggested by P.J. Oliver, NZARP geologist who studied the peak, 1981-82.

=== Painted Peak ===
72°27′S 163°45′E. A peak rising from the north part of Russet Hills in the Gallipoli Heights. Descriptively named by the NZ-APC on the proposal of P.J. Oliver, NZARP geologist who studied the feature, 1981-82. Ignimbrite and dacite breccia cut by dikes of andesite and dacite give the peak many colors.

=== Russet Hills ===
72°27′S 163°47′E. A line of hills trending east–west for 3.5 nautical miles (6.5 km; 4.0 mi) and forming the southern ridge of Gallipoli Heights. Named by the NZ-APC on the proposal of P.J. Oliver, NZARP geologist who studied the hills, 1981-82. Named descriptively from the red-colored ignimbrite rock of this feature.

== Nearby features ==
=== Monte Cassino ===
72°19′S 163°40′E. A peak, 2,270 metres (7,450 ft) high, at the southeast side of Moawhango Névé. Named by the Northern Party of NZGSAE, 1963-64, for the association with Lord Freyberg and the Second New Zealand Expeditionary Force.

=== Black Stump ===
72°22′S 163°48′E. A prominent but low mountain 4.5 nautical miles (8.3 km; 5.2 mi) southeast of Monte Cassino. The feature is a black peaked mass of andesite rock, possibly the stump of an old volcano. Descriptively named by NZARP geologist P.J. Oliver, who studied the mountain in the 1981-82 season.

=== Lookout Nunatak ===
72°23′S 163°54′E. A nunatak lying 6.5 nautical miles (12.0 km; 7.5 mi) southeast of Monte Cassino. The nunatak is in the middle of an icefall overlooking Gallipoli Heights to the southwest. So named by NZARP geologist P.J. Oliver because the nunatak served as a lookout on the initial visit to the area in the 1981-82 season.

=== Mount Jackman ===
72°24′S 163°15′E. A mountain, 1,920 metres (6,300 ft) high, standing 9 nautical miles (17 km; 10 mi) south of Mount Baldwin in the Freyberg Mountains. Named by the United States Advisory Committee on Antarctic Names (US-ACAN) for Warren A. Jackman, photographer, a member of the United States ArmyRP Victoria Land Traverse Party which surveyed this area in 1959-60.

=== Mount Massell ===
72°29′S 163°21′E. A mountain, 1,880 metres (6,170 ft) high, standing 6 nautical miles (11 km; 6.9 mi) southeast of Mount Jackman. Mapped by the United States Geological Survey (USGS) from surveys and United States Navy air photos, 1960-64. Named by the US-ACAN for Wulf Massell, Biolab Manager at McMurdo Station in 1967.

=== Salvador Nunatak ===
72°34′S 163°20′E. A nunatak 2 nautical miles (3.7 km; 2.3 mi) north of Schumann Nunatak, in the southwest part of Freyberg Mountains. Mapped by the USGS from surveys and United States Navy air photos, 1960-64. Named by the US-ACAN for Anthony Salvador, ionospheric physics researcher at McMurdo Station in 1967.

=== Schumann Nunatak ===
72°35′S 163°18′E. A nunatak 2 nautical miles (3.7 km; 2.3 mi) south of Salvador Nunatak, at the southwest end of Freyberg Mountains. Mapped by the USGS from surveys and United States Navy air photos, 1960-64. Named by the US-ACAN for Edward A. Schumann, cosmic ray researcher at McMurdo Station in 1967.

=== Cameron Nunataks ===
72°36′S 136°43′E. A small cluster of nunataks rising above the west margin of Evans Névé, at the south end of Freyberg Mountains. Mapped by the USGS from surveys and United States Navy air photos, 1960-64. Named by the US-ACAN for Roy E. Cameron, biologist at McMurdo Station, summers 1966-67 and 1967-68.

=== Coates Rocks ===
72°32′S 164°20′E. A small group of rocks in the northwest part of Evans Névé, at the south side of Freyberg Mountains. Mapped by the USGS from surveys and United States Navy air photos 1960-64. Named by the US-ACAN for Donald A. Coates, United States ArmyRP geologist at Hallett Station, summer 1964-65, and McMurdo Station, 1966-67.

== Sources ==
- Alberts, Fred G., ed. (1995), Geographic Names of the Antarctic (PDF) (2 ed.), United States Board on Geographic Names This article incorporates public domain material from websites or documents of the United States Board on Geographic Names.
- Freyberg Mountains, USGS: United States Geographic Board

This article incorporates public domain material from websites or documents of the United States Geological Survey.
