= Freyberg Mountains =

Mountains in Antarctica

- Location within Antarctica

Geography
- Continent: Antarctica
- Region(s): Victoria Land, Antarctica
- Range coordinates: 72°15′S 163°45′E

The Freyberg Mountains (72°15′S 163°45′E) are a group of mountains in Victoria Land, Antarctica, bounded by the Rennick Glacier, Bowers Mountains, Black Glacier, and Evans Névé. They are west of the Victory Mountains and south of the Bowers Mountains.

== Name ==
The Freyberg Mountains were named for New Zealand's most famous general, Bernard Freyberg, by the Northern Party of New Zealand Geological Survey Antarctic Expedition (NZGSAE), 1963–64.

== Location ==
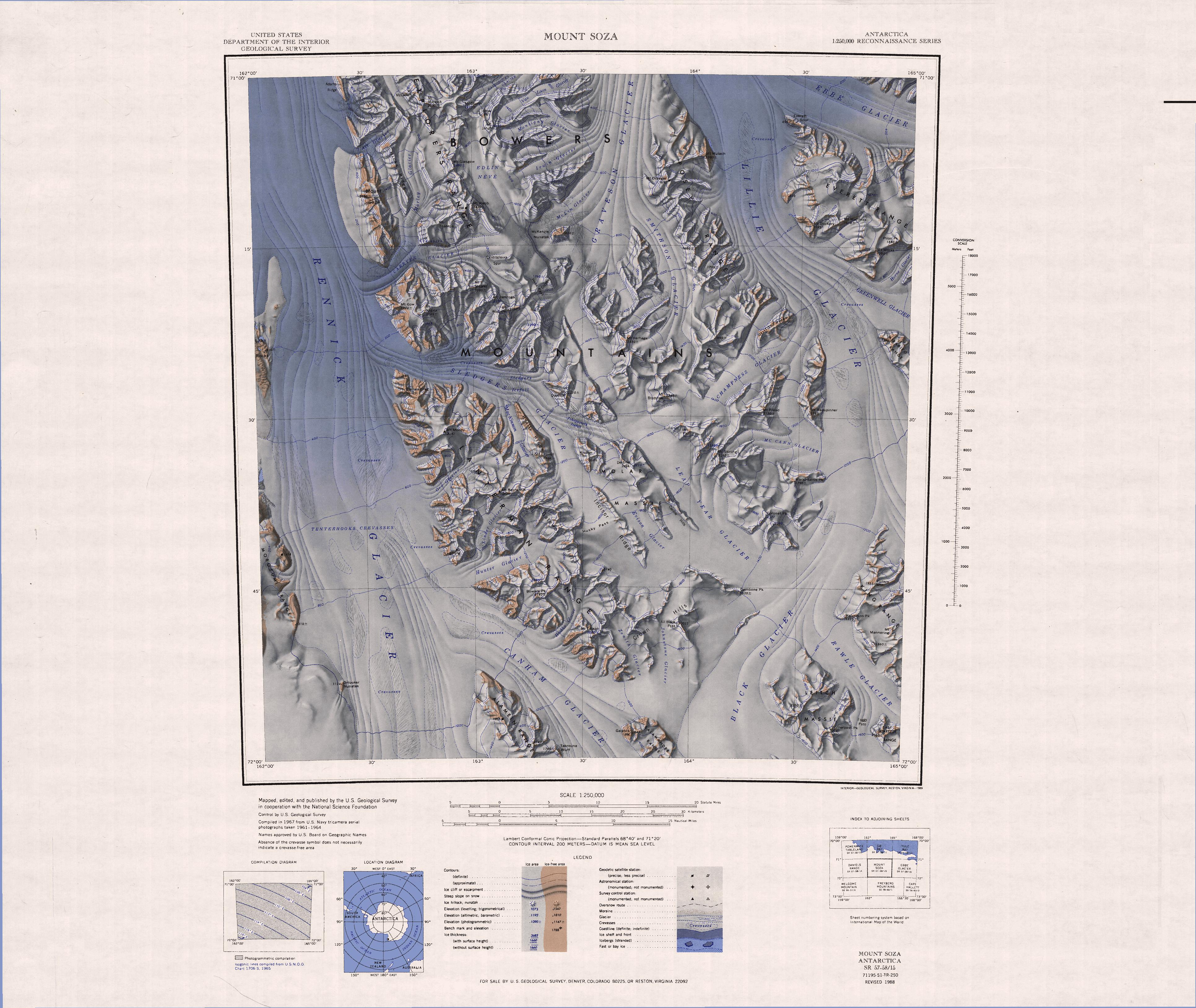
Northern tip of Alamein Range in west of center in south of map

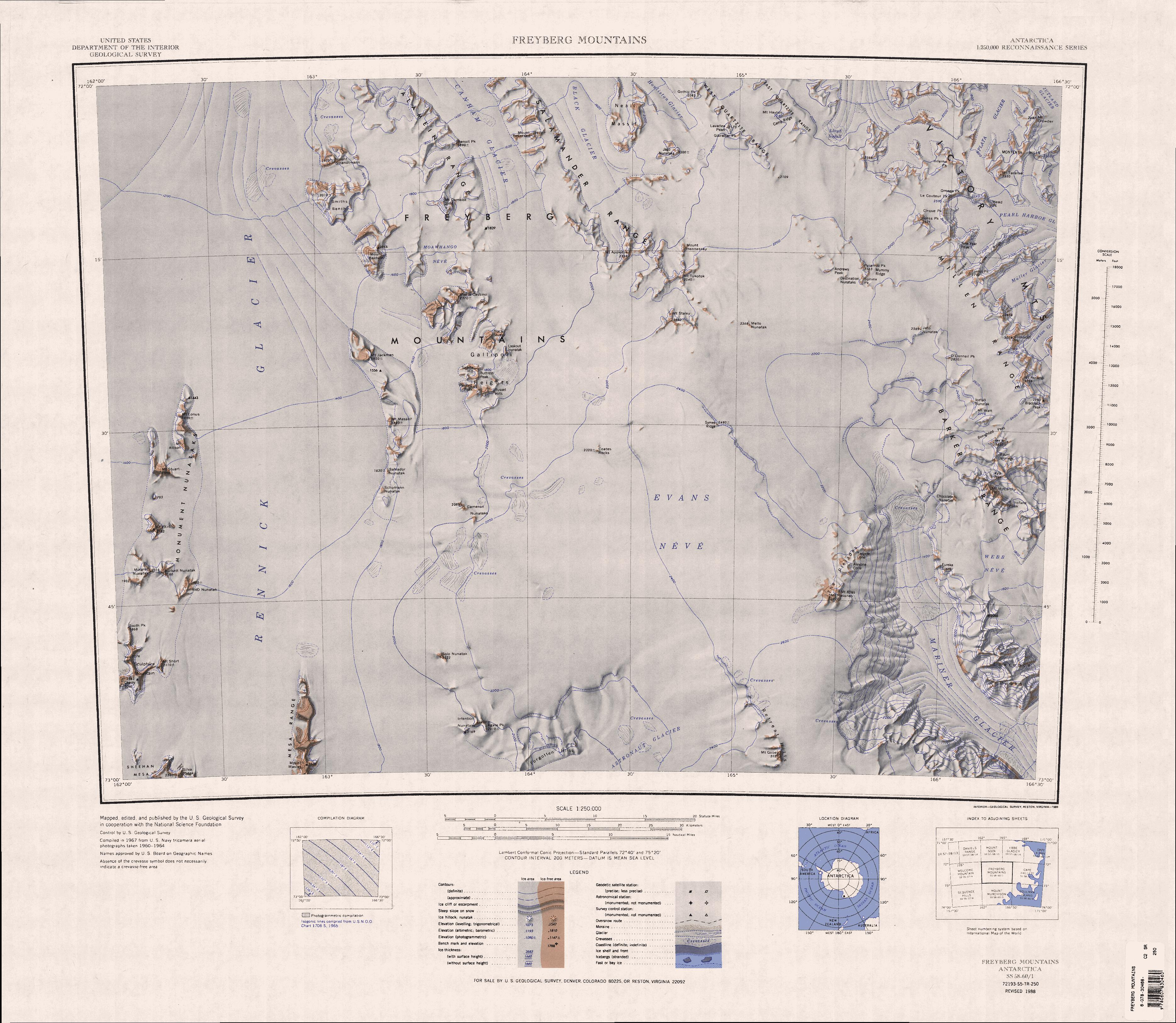
Alamein Range west of center in north of map

The Freyberg Mountains lie to the east of the Rennick Glacier and to the south of the Bowers Mountains. The Canham Glacier defines their northwest limit. The Black Glacier defines their eastern limit, separating them from the Leitch Massif, Neall Massif and West Quartzite Range further east. They extend south to the Evans Névé.

== Mountains ==
Name	Coordinates	Height
Mount Baldwin	72°15′S 163°18′E	
Buttress Peak	72°26′S 163°45′E	
Mount Jackman	72°24′S 163°15′E	1,920 metres (6,300 ft)
Mount Strandtmann	72°7′S 163°5′E	
Mount Massell	72°29′S 163°21′E	1,880 metres (6,170 ft)

== Ranges ==
Geographical divisions of Freyberg Mountains include:

- Alamein Range 72°5′S 163°30′E, a range lying west of Canham Glacier.
- Salamander Range 72°6′S 164°8′E, a distinctive linear range between Canham Glacier and Black Glacier.
- Gallipoli Heights 72°26′S 163°48′E, a group of peaks and ridges centered 7.5 nautical miles (13.9 km; 8.6 mi) south-southeast of Monte Cassino.

== Sources ==
- Alberts, Fred G., ed. (1995), Geographic Names of the Antarctic (PDF) (2 ed.), United States Board on Geographic Names This article incorporates public domain material from websites or documents of the United States Board on Geographic Names.
- Freyberg Mountains, USGS: United States Geographic Board
- Mount Soza, USGS: United States Geographic Board

This article incorporates public domain material from websites or documents of the United States Geological Survey.
