= Alamein Range =

Mountain range in Victoria Land, Antarctica

- Location within Antarctica

Geography
- Continent: Antarctica
- Region(s): Victoria Land, Antarctica
- Range coordinates: 72°5′S 163°30′E

Alamein Range (72°5′S 163°30′E) is a range lying west of Canham Glacier, in the Freyberg Mountains of Antarctica. It was named in association with Lord Bernard Freyberg and the Second New Zealand Expeditionary Force by the Northern Party of New Zealand Geological Survey Antarctic Expedition (NZGSAE), 1963–64.

== Location ==
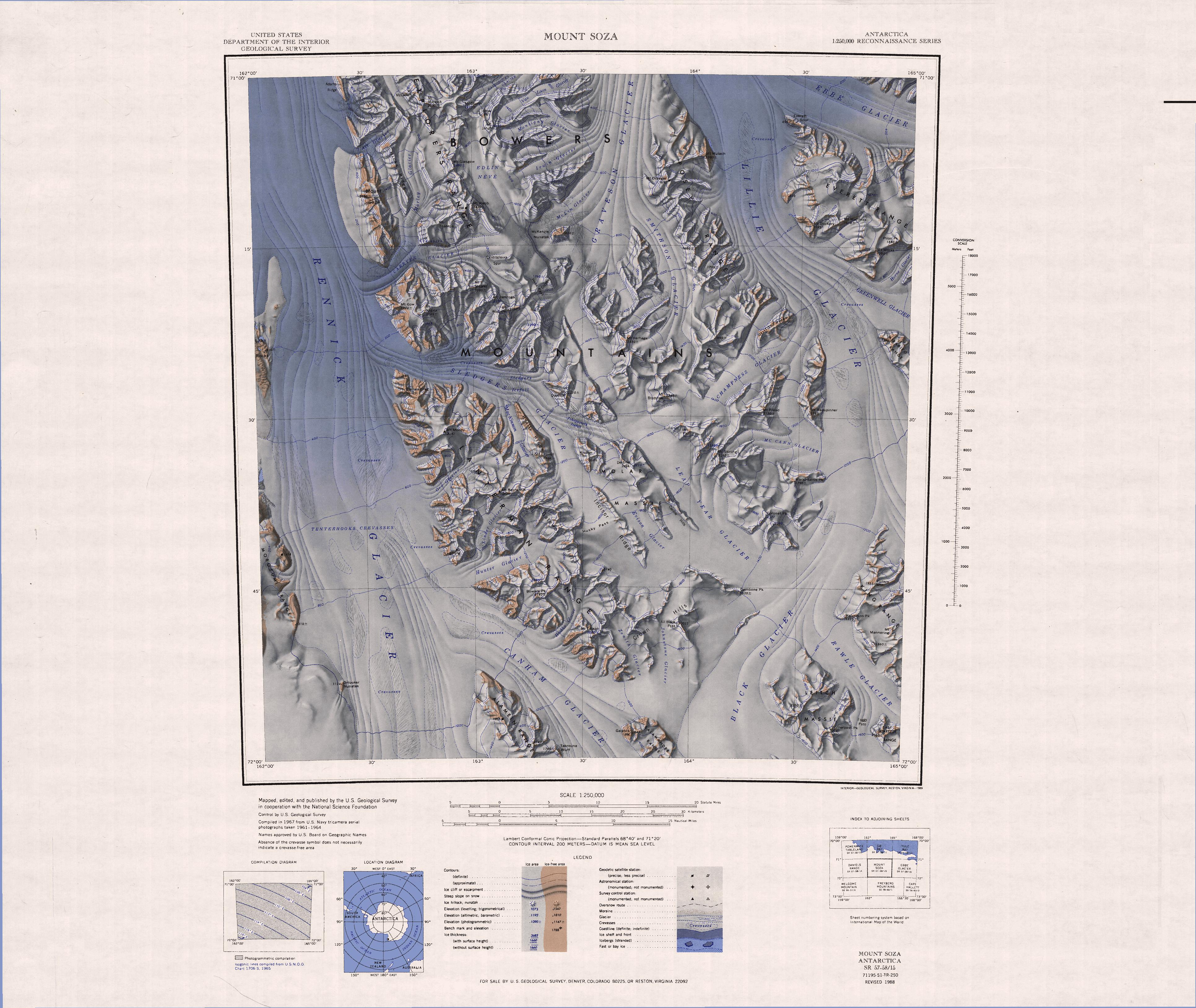
Northern tip of Alamein Range in west of center in south of map

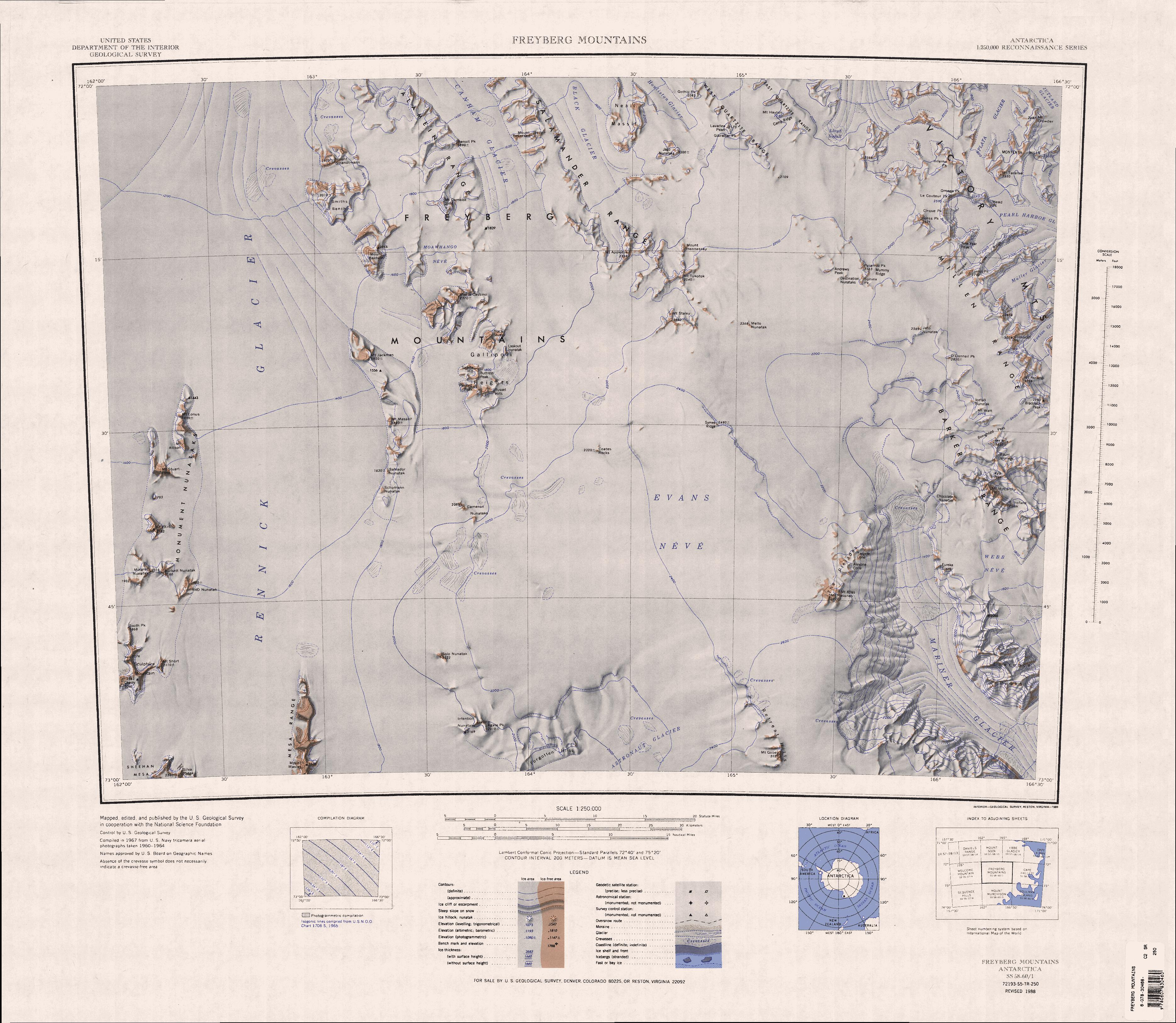
Alamein Range west of center in north of map

The Alamein Range runs from northwest to southeast. It lies to the east of the Rennick Glacier and west of the Canham Glacier. The Salamander Range is parallel to it on the east side of the Canham Glacier. In the north, the Canham Glacier joins the Rennick Glacier past the tip of the Alamein Range. Features, from north to south, include Takrouna Bluff, Benoit Peak and Mount Camelot. Features to the west, between the Alamein Range and Rennick Glacier, include Mount Strandmann, Smiths Bench, Mount Baldwin and the Moawhango Névé.

== Features ==
=== Takrouna Bluff ===
71°59′S 163°23′E. A small but prominent bluff on the east side of Alamein Range, overlooking Canham Glacier from a position 6 nautical miles (11 km; 6.9 mi) west-southwest of Galatos Peak. Named by the northern party of NZGSAE, 1963–64, after Takrouna, a similar feature in Tunisia associated with Lord Freyberg and the Second New Zealand Expeditionary Force during World War II.

=== Benoit Peak ===
72°06′S 163°40′E. A peak 5 nautical miles (9.3 km; 5.8 mi) north-northeast of Mount Camelot. Mapped by the United States Geological Survey (USGS) from surveys and United States Navy air photos, 1960-64. Named by the United States Advisory Committee on Antarctic Names (US-ACAN) for Robert E. Benoit, biologist at McMurdo Station, summers 1966-67 and 1967-68.

=== Mount Camelot ===
72°11′S 163°37′E. A mountain, 2,590 metres (8,500 ft) high, rising near the center of the Freyberg Mountains and being the highest summit of this group. Named by the New Zealand Antarctic Place-Names Committee (NZ-APC) in 1968. The mountain is of geological interest as one of the localities where the sub-beacon erosion surface is exposed.

== Nearby features ==
=== Mount Strandtmann ===
72°07′S 163°05′E. A mountain 3 nautical miles (5.6 km; 3.5 mi) north of Smiths Bench. Mapped by USGS from surveys and United States Navy air photos, 1960-64. Named by US-ACAN for Russell W. Strandtmann, biologist at McMurdo Station, summers 1966-67 and 1967-68.

=== Smiths Bench ===
72°10′S 163°08′E. A distinctive bench-like elevation 5 nautical miles (9.3 km; 5.8 mi) northwest of Mount Baldwin. Named by US-ACAN for William M. Smith, psychologist, a member of the United States ArmyRP Victoria Land Traverse Party which surveyed this area in 1959-60.

=== Mount Baldwin ===
72°15′S 163°18′E. A mountain 5 nautical miles (9.3 km; 5.8 mi) southeast of Smiths Bench. Named by US-ACAN for T.T. Baldwin, transport specialist, a member of the United States ArmyRP Victoria Land Traverse Party which surveyed this area in 1959-60.

=== Moawhango Névé ===
72°15′S 163°34′E. A small névé between Mount Camelot and Monte Cassino. Named by the NZGSAE, 1967–68, in association with a locality of the same name in New Zealand.

== Sources ==
- Alberts, Fred G., ed. (1995), Geographic Names of the Antarctic (PDF) (2 ed.), United States Board on Geographic Names This article incorporates public domain material from websites or documents of the United States Board on Geographic Names.
- Freyberg Mountains, USGS: United States Geographic Board
- Mount Soza, USGS: United States Geographic Board

This article incorporates public domain material from websites or documents of the United States Geological Survey.
