= Salamander Range =

Mountain range in Victoria Land, Antarctica

- Location within Antarctica

Geography
- Continent: Antarctica
- Region(s): Victoria Land, Antarctica
- Range coordinates: 72°6′S 164°8′E

Salamander Range (72°6′S 164°8′E) is a distinctive linear range between Canham Glacier and Black Glacier, in the Freyberg Mountains, Antarctica. The range was named by the Northern Party of New Zealand Geological Survey Antarctic Expedition (NZGSAE), 1963–64, from the nickname given to Lord Freyberg by Sir Winston Churchill, for the lizard that is untouched by fire.

== Location ==
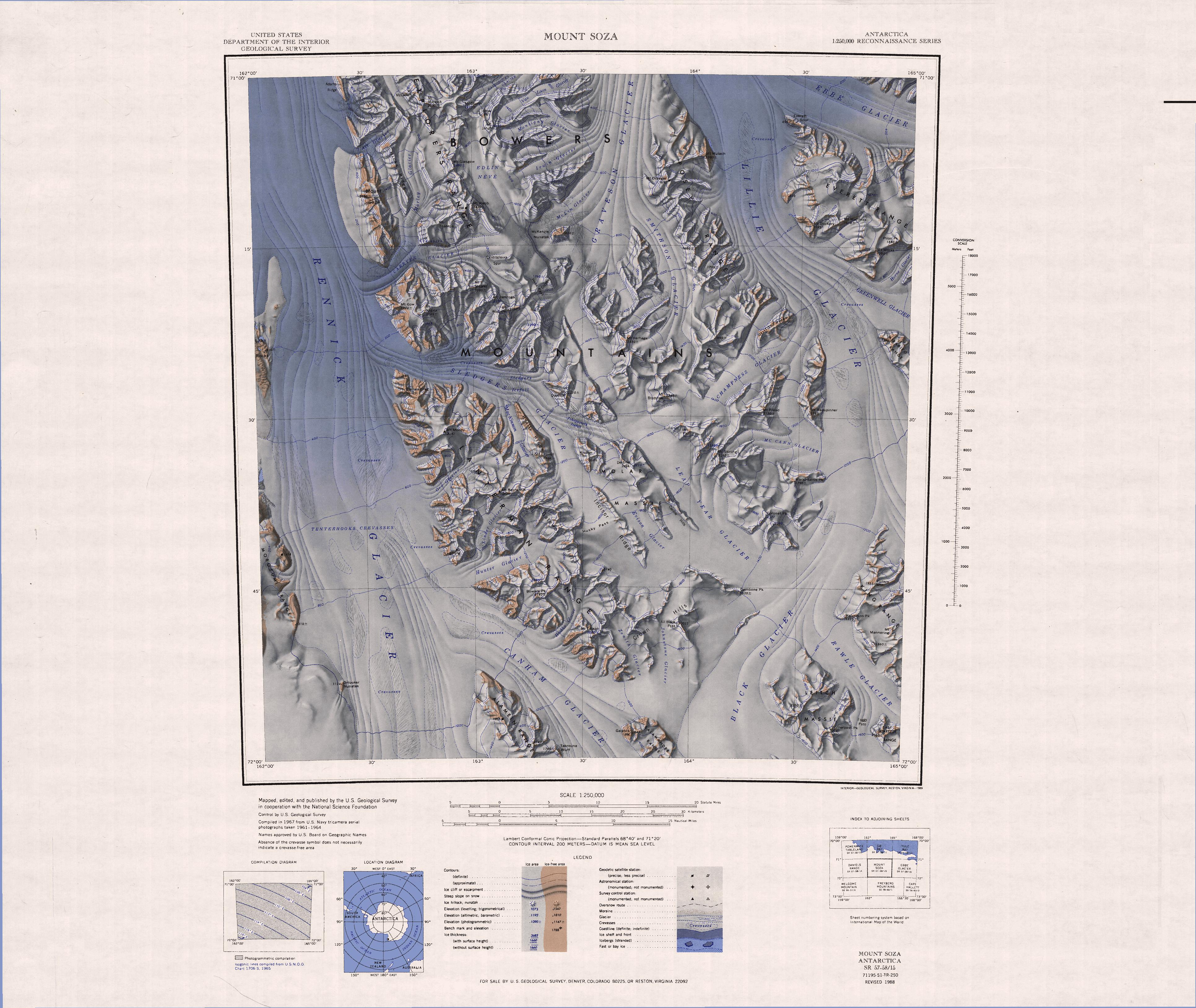
Northern tip of Salamander Range in center of south of map

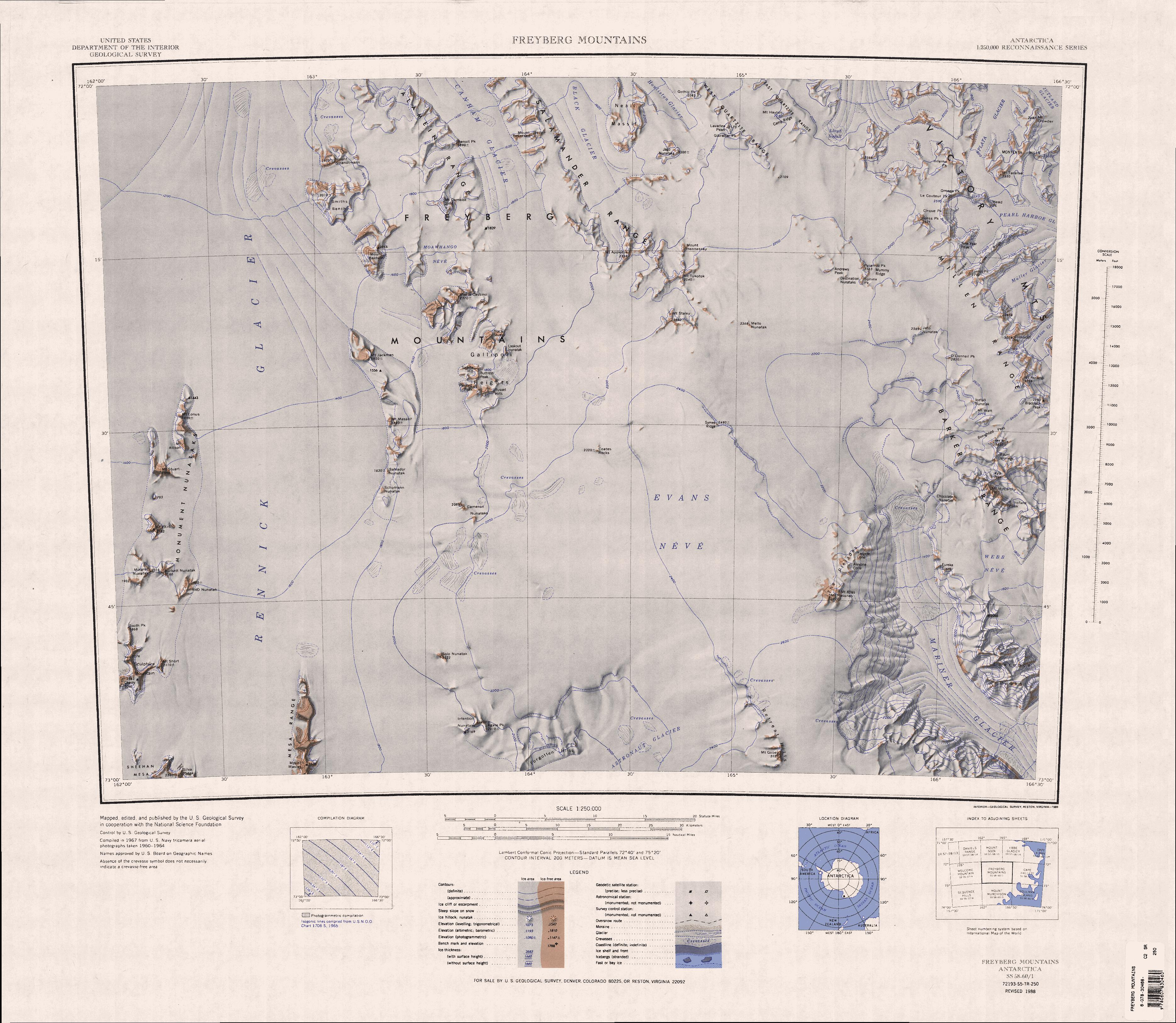
Salamander Range in center of north of map

The Salamander Range runs from northwest to southeast between the Canham Glacier to the west and the Black Glacier to the east. The Lanterman Range is to the north and the Leitch Massif to the northwest. The Alamein Range is west of the Canham Glacier and the Neall Massif and West Quartzite Range are east of the Black Glacier. The Evans Névé is to the south. Features of the range include, from north to south, Galatos Peak, Mount Pedersen, Mount Apolotok, Mount Hennessey, Mount Tukotok and Mount Staley. Mello Nunatak.and Symes Nunatak are to the south.

== Features ==
Geographical features of Salamander Range include, from north to south:

=== Galatos Peak ===
71°58′S 163°43′E. A peak, 2,045 metres (6,709 ft) high, that marks the northwest extremity of Salamander Range. Named by the northern party of the NZGSAE, 1963–64, after Galatos, a village in Crete associated with Lord Freyberg and the Second New Zealand Expeditionary Force during World War II.

=== Mount Pedersen ===
72°05′S 164°02′E. A mountain, 2,070 metres (6,790 ft) high, standing 9 nautical miles (17 km; 10 mi) southeast of Galatos Peak. Mapped by the United States Geological Survey (USGS) from surveys and United States Navy air photos, 1960–64. Named by the United States Advisory Committee on Antarctic Names (US-ACAN) for John M. Pedersen, biologist at McMurdo Station, summers 1965-66 and 1966–67.

=== Mount Apolotok ===
72°15′S 164°29′E. A prominent red granite peak, 2,555 metres (8,383 ft) high. The name is of Eskimo origin, meaning "the big red one," and was given by the Northern Party of NZGSAE, 1963–64.

=== Mount Hennessey ===
72°14′S 164°45′E. A mountain 2 nautical miles (3.7 km; 2.3 mi) north of Mount Tukotok. Mapped by USGS from surveys and United States Navy air photos, 1960–64. Named by US-ACAN for Raymond W. Hennessey, aerographer at Hallett Station in 1957.

=== Mount Tukotok ===
72°17′S 164°43′E. A red granite peak, 2,540 metres (8,330 ft) high, standing 5 nautical miles (9.3 km; 5.8 mi) east-southeast of Mount Apolotok. Named by the Northern Party of NZGSAE, 1963–64. The name is of Eskimo origin and means "the little red one."

=== Mount Staley ===
72°20′S 164°41′E. A mountain, 2,560 metres (8,400 ft) high, at the south end of the Salamander Range. Mapped by USGS from surveys and United States Navy air photos, 1960–64. Named by US-ACAN for James T. Staley, biologist at Hallett Station, summer 1962–63.

=== Mello Nunatak ===
72°21′S 165°03′E. An isolated nunatak standing 7 nautical miles (13 km; 8.1 mi) east of Mount Staley of the Freyberg Mountains, in the northeast part of Evans Névé. Mapped by USGS from surveys and United States Navy air photos, 1960–64. Named by US-ACAN for Gerald L. Mello, chief engineman, United States Navy, petty officer in charge of Hallett Station, summer 1966–67, and member of the McMurdo Station winter party of 1967.

=== Symes Nunatak ===
72°30′S 164°55′E. A nunatak near the middle of Evans Névé, situated 9 nautical miles (17 km; 10 mi) southeast of Mount Staley. Named by the New Zealand Antarctic Place-Names Committee (NZ-APC) in 1983 after J. Symes, geological assistant in R.A. Cooper's New Zealand Antarctic Research Programme (NZARP) geological field party to the area, 1974–75.

== Sources ==
- Alberts, Fred G., ed. (1995), Geographic Names of the Antarctic (PDF) (2 ed.), United States Board on Geographic Names This article incorporates public domain material from websites or documents of the United States Board on Geographic Names.
- Freyberg Mountains, USGS: United States Geographic Board
- Mount Soza, USGS: United States Geographic Board

This article incorporates public domain material from websites or documents of the United States Geological Survey.
