= Sample Nunataks =

Sample Nunataks (70°53′S 159°52′E) is a cluster of nunataks located at the convergence point of the Lovejoy and Harlin Glaciers, in the Usarp Mountains. Named by Advisory Committee on Antarctic Names (US-ACAN) for Gerald M. Sample, U.S. Navy, radio operator on R4D aircraft, 1961–62, and again in 1962–63 in support of the United States Geological Survey (USGS) Topo East-West party, including the survey of these nunataks.

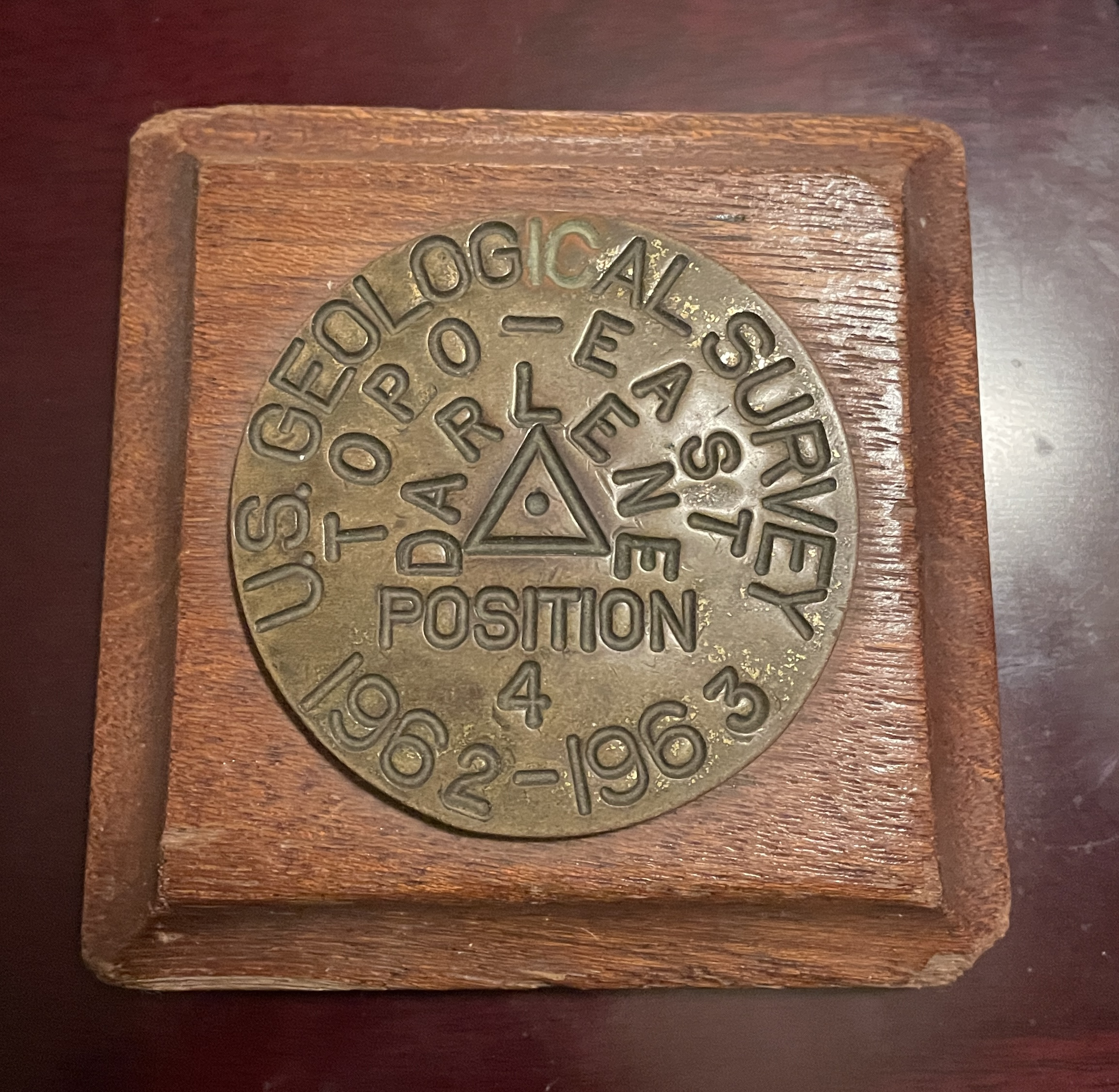
Brass Geologic position marker - highest peak "Darlene" - Position 4

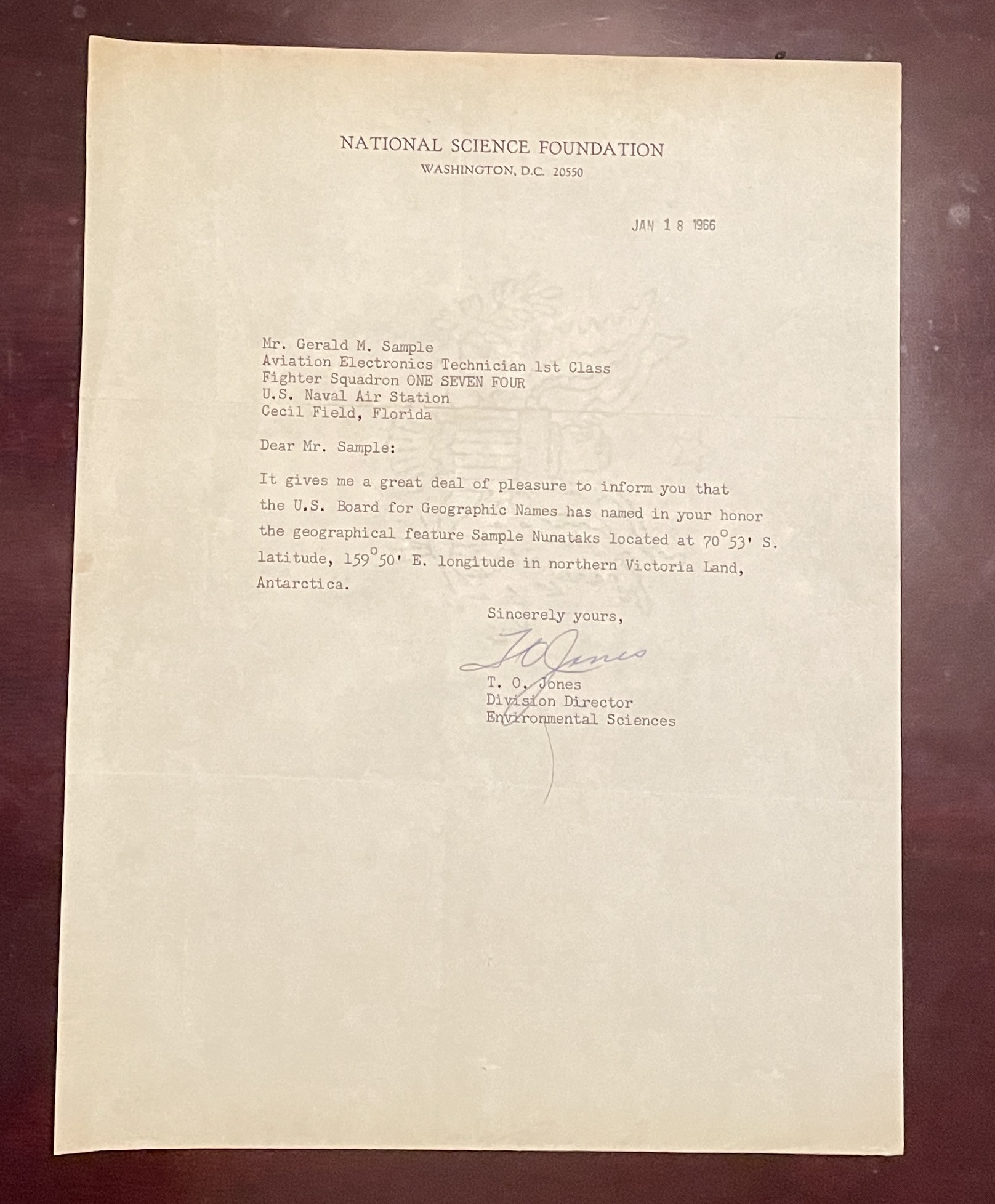
Letter from National Science Foundation

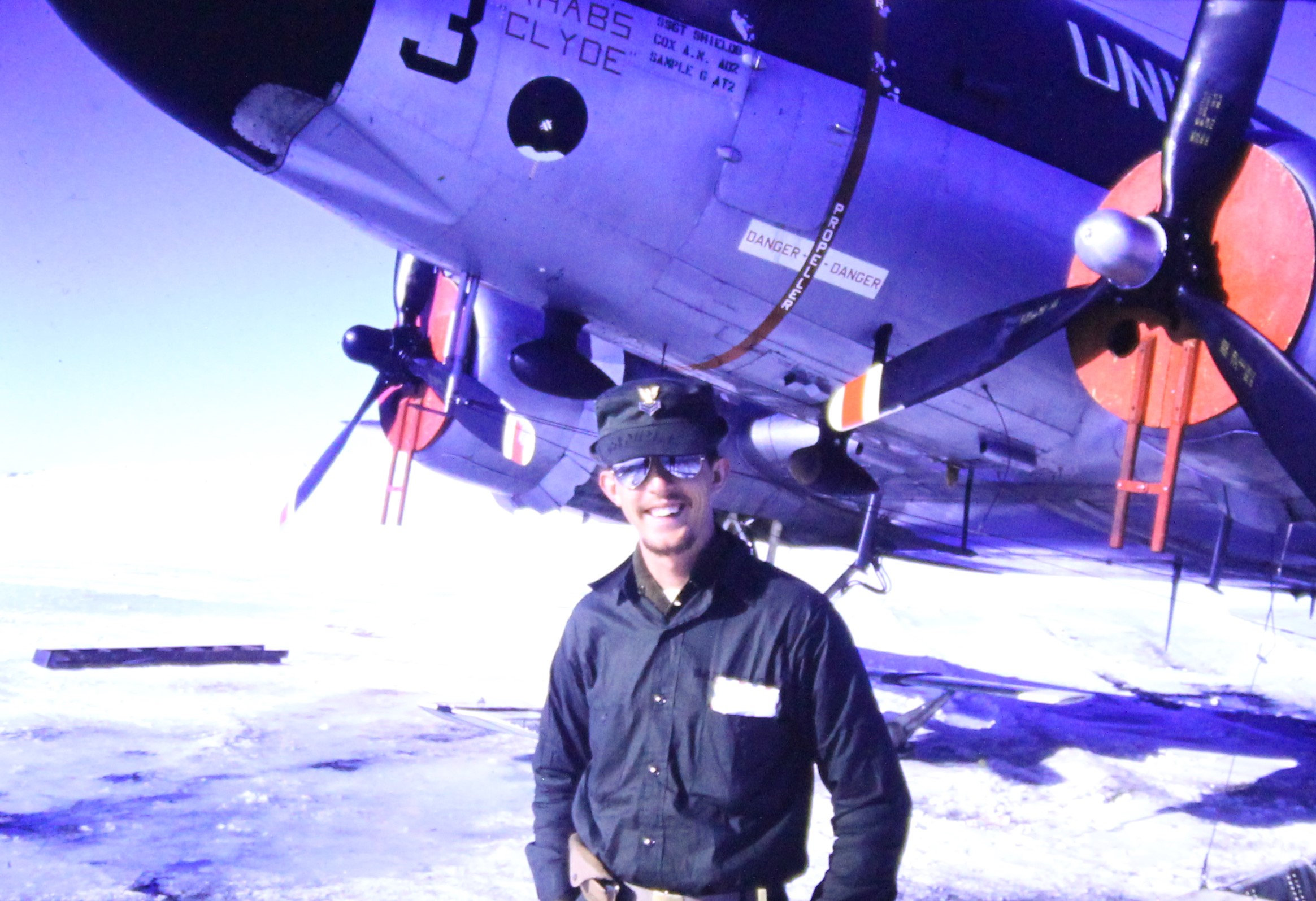
ATC Gerald Mc Sample

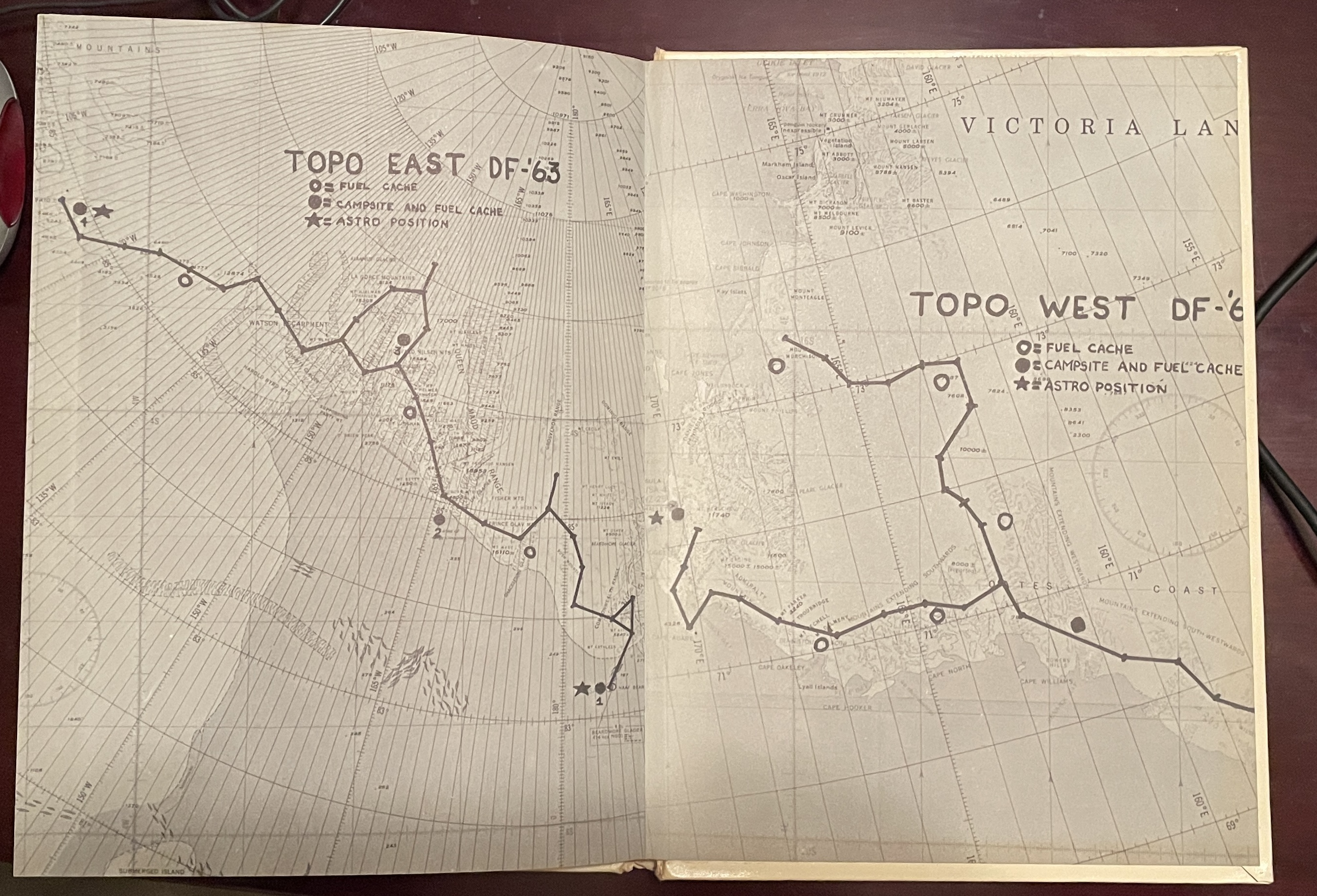
TOPO Flight Plan Maps
