= Rennick Glacier =

Glacier in Antarctica

- Location within Antarctica
- Type: Outlet glacier
- Location: East Antarctica
- Coordinates: 70°30′S 160°45′E
- Terminus: Southern Ocean

Rennick Glacier (70°30′S 160°45′E) is a broad glacier, nearly 200 nautical miles (370 km; 230 mi) long, which is one of the largest in Antarctica. It rises on the polar plateau westward of Mesa Range and is 20 to 30 nautical miles (37 to 56 km; 23 to 35 mi) wide, narrowing to 10 nautical miles (19 km; 12 mi) near the coast. It takes its name from Rennick Bay where the glacier reaches the sea.

== Early exploration ==
The seaward part of the glacier was photographed by United States Navy Operation Highjump, 1946–47. The upper reaches of the Rennick Glacier were discovered and explored by the U.S. Victoria Land Traverse (VLT) in February 1960, and the first ascent made of Welcome Mountain by John Weihaupt, Alfred Stuart, Claude Lorius and Arnold Heine of the VLT party. On February 10, 1960, Lieutenant Commander Robert L. Dale, pilot of U.S. Navy (USN) Squadron VX-6, evacuated the VLT from 72°38′S 161°32′E, on this glacier, and then conducted an aerial photographic reconnaissance to Rennick Bay on the coast before returning the VLT team to McMurdo Station.

== Course ==
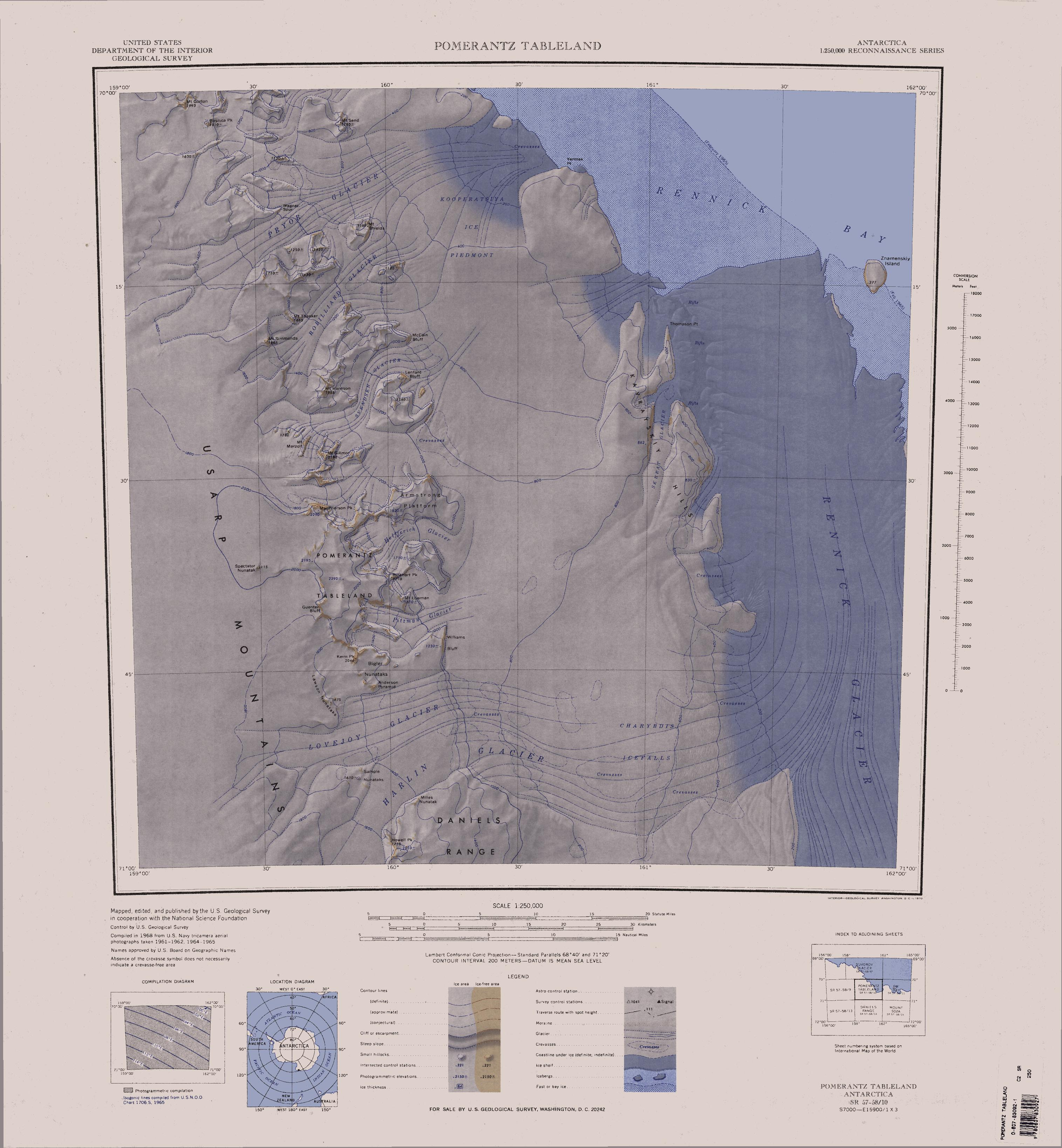
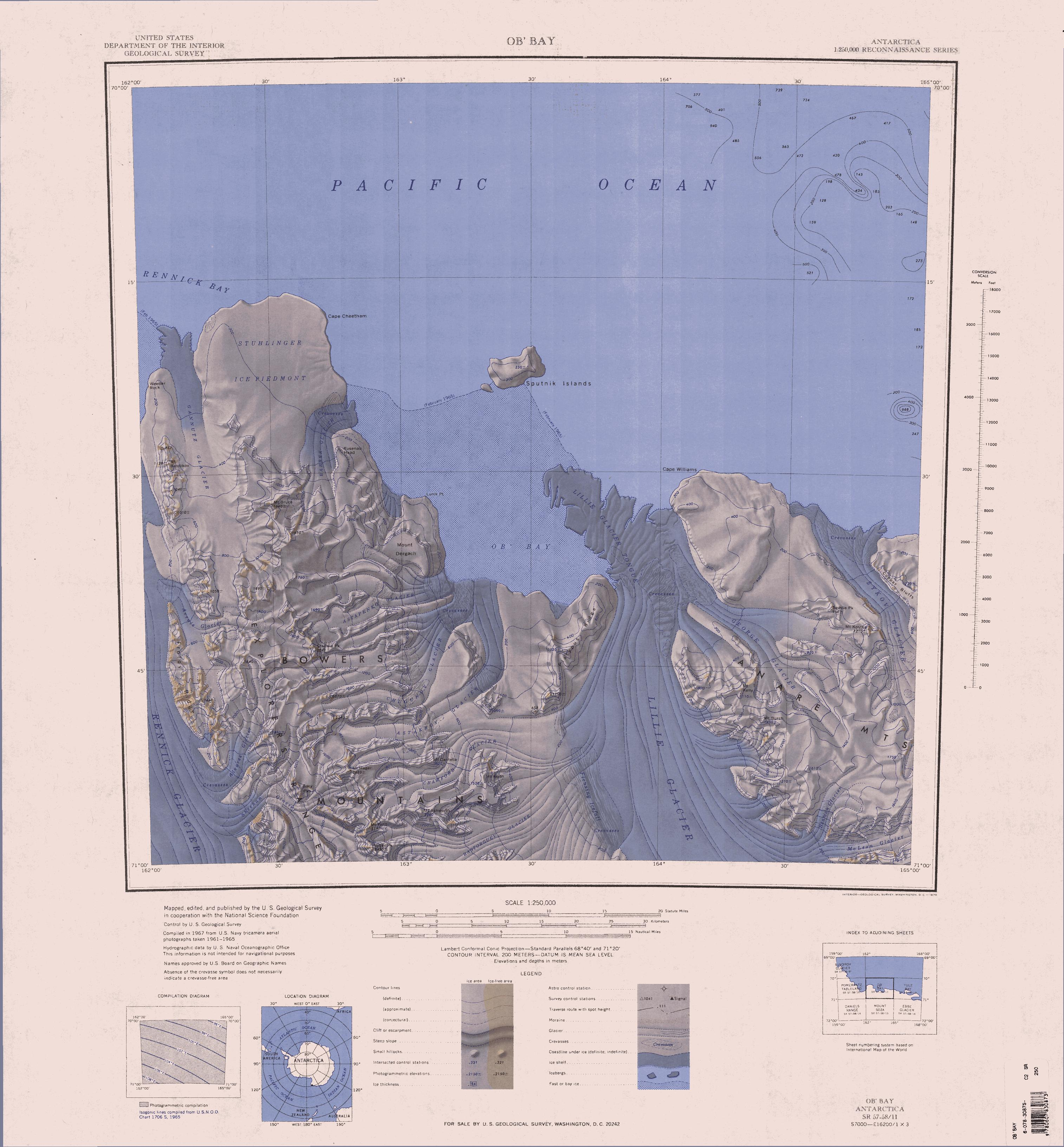
Mouth of glacier, west and east. Click image to enlarge.
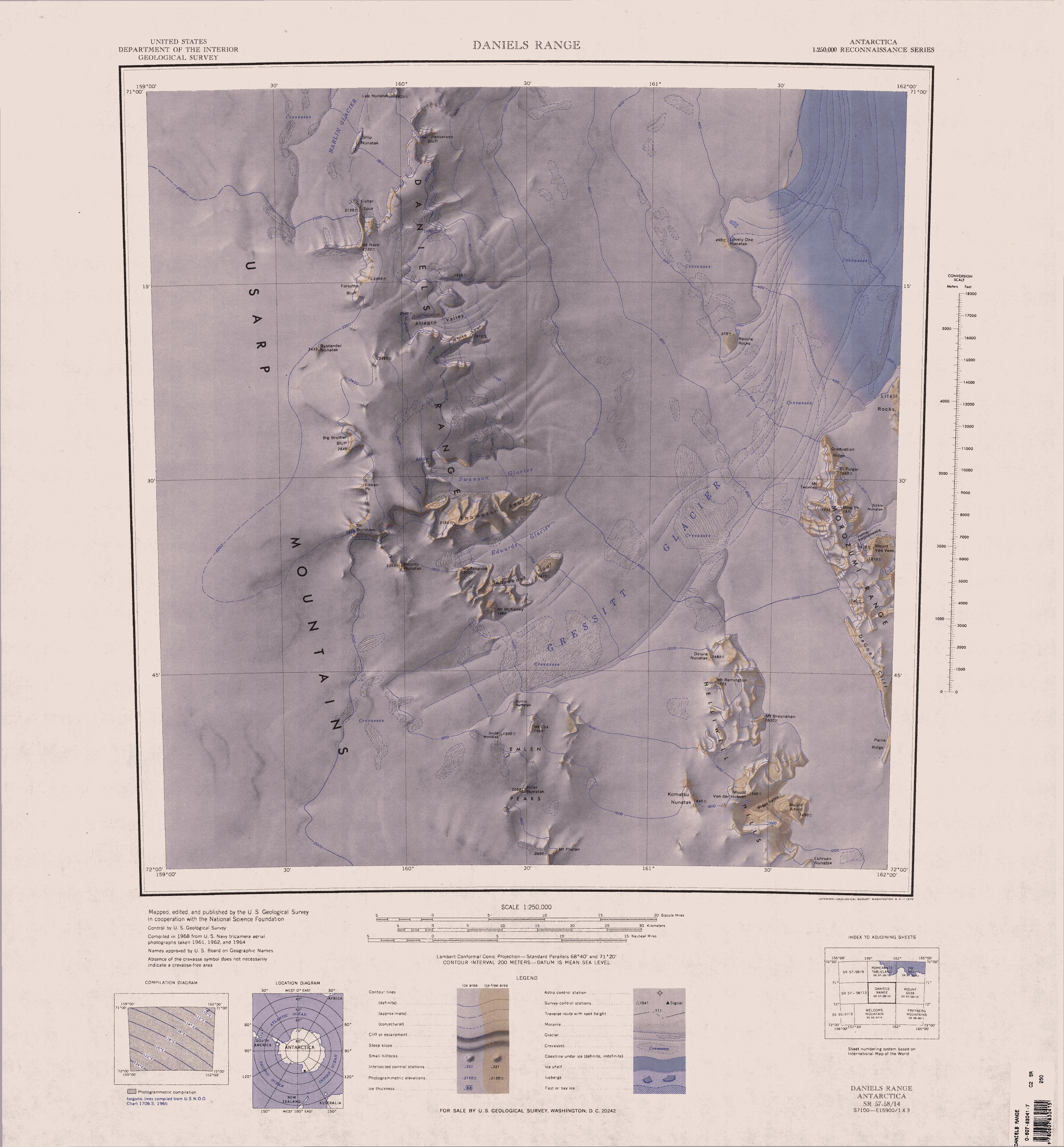
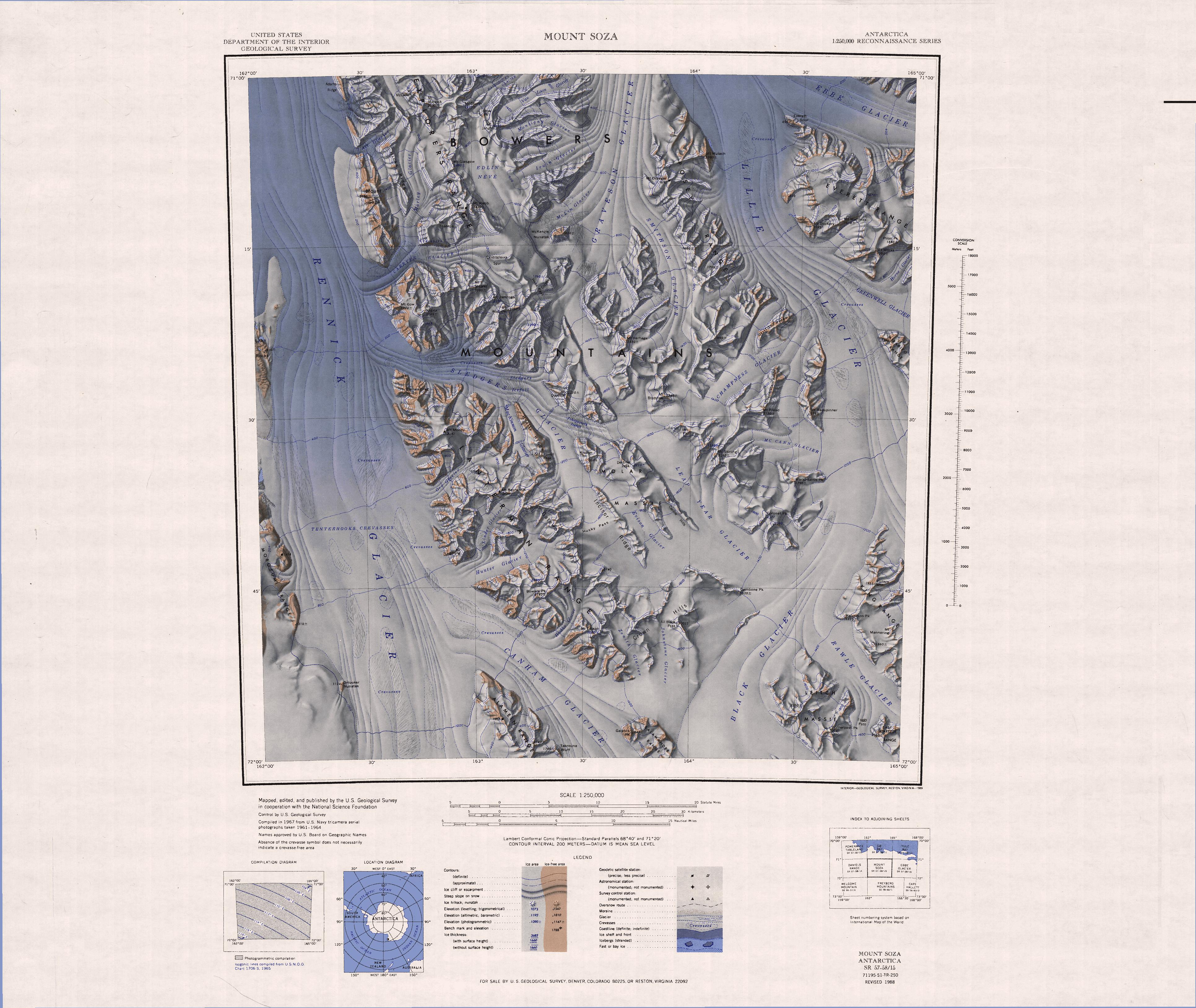
Lower section, west and east
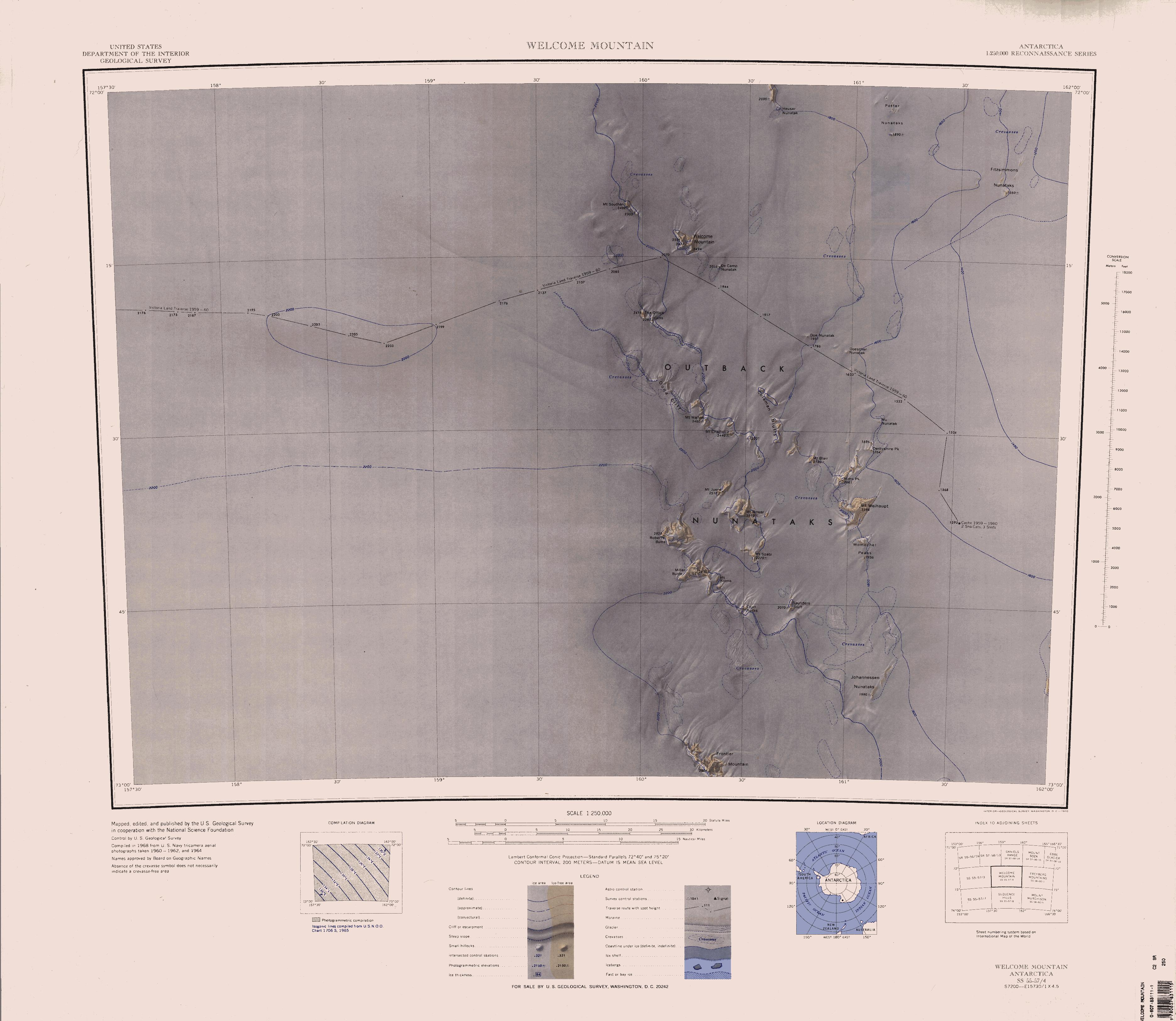
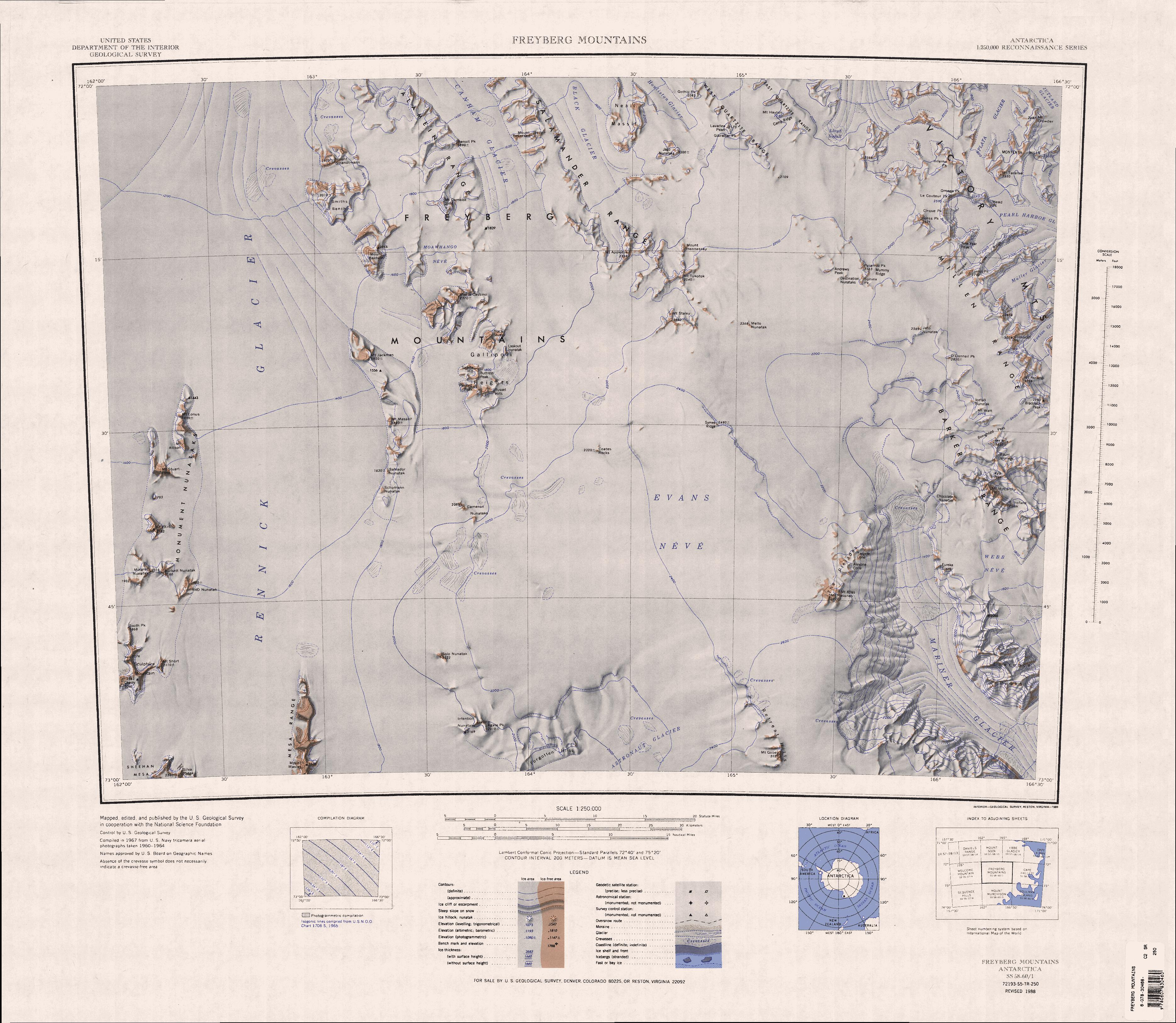
Upper section, west and east
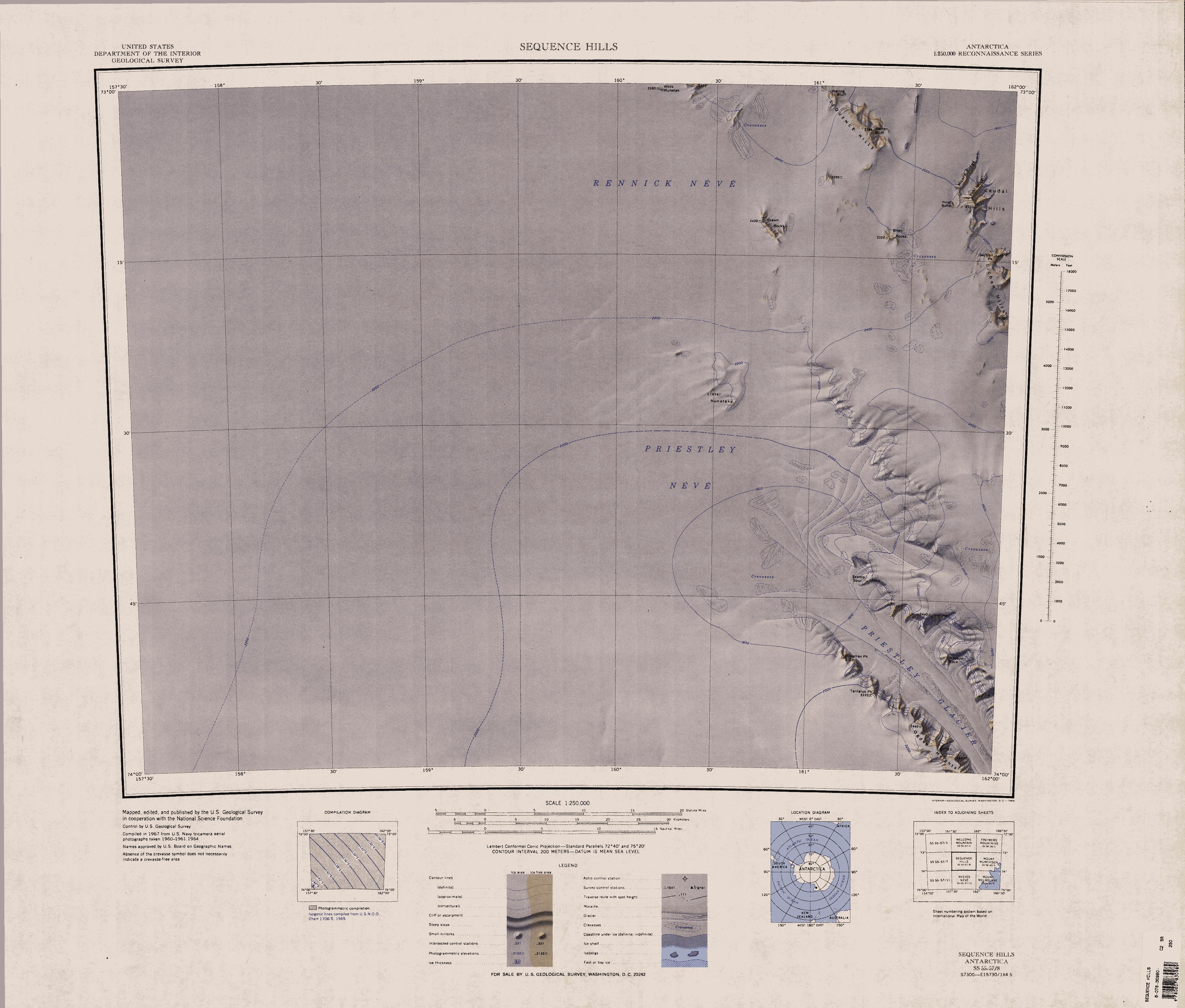
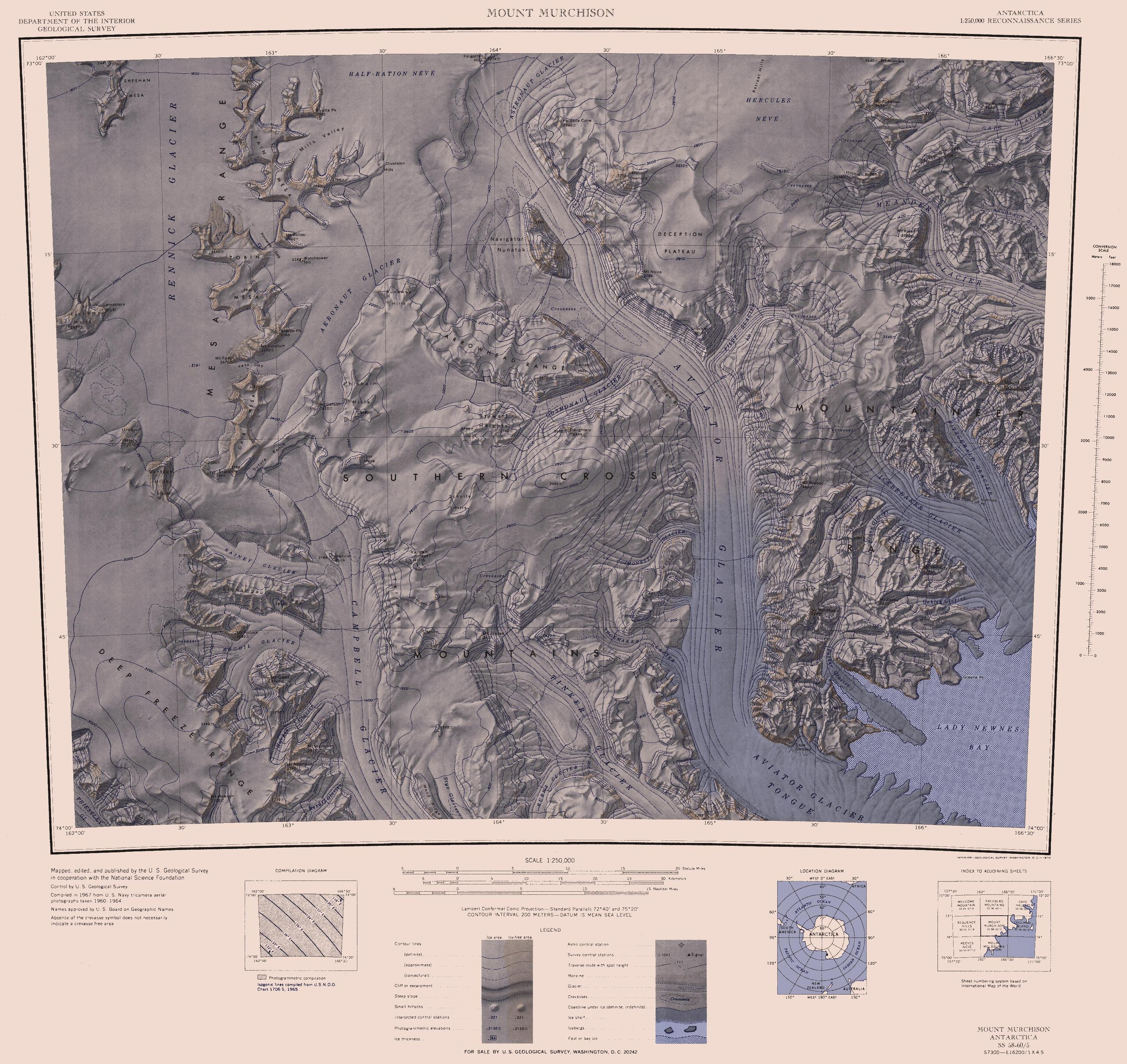
Head of glacier, west and east

The Rennick Glacier rises to the east of the Tobin Mesa in the Mesa Range, north of the Vantage Hills and Illusion Hills, and east of the Lichen Hills and Lemasters Bluff. It flows north past the Pain Mesa to its east and Sheehan Mesa to its west. The glacier continues north past the Monument Nunataks to its west and Freyberg Mountains to its east. The Outback Nunataks are to the west of its upper section.

The Rennick Glacier flows north past the Alamein Range to its east, where it is joined by the Canham Glacier. It passes the Onlooker Nunatak and Morozumi Range to its west, and is joined by the Hunter Glacier from the Lanterman Range to the east, just after Linder Glacier has joined Hunter Glacier. North of that it receives Orr Glacier from the east just north of the Tenterhooks Crevasses.

Further north the Rennick Glacier receives Sledgers Glacier, Carryer Glacier and Alt Glacier from the Explorers Range to the east. Sledgers Glacier tributaries include Tobogganers Icefall and MacKinnon Glacier, which enters at Sledgers Icefall. Carryer Glacier tributaries include Morley Glacier.

To the north of Morozumi Range the Rennick Glacier is joined from the west by the wide Gressit Glacier. At its mouth the Rennick Glacier receives ice from the Lovejoy Glacier and Harlin Glacier, which flow east through the Charybdis Icefalls. It is joined from the west by the small Serrat Glacier just before entering Rennick Bay. Tributaries from the Explorers Range to the east include Sheehan Glacier, Alvarez Glacier and Arruiz Glacier.

Many of the features and tributary glaciers were mapped by the United States Geological Survey (USGS) from surveys and United States Navy air photos, 1960-64.

== Features ==
Features, from south to north, include

=== Rennick Névé ===
73°10′S 160°20′E. The névé at the head of Rennick Glacier in Victoria Land. Named by the New Zealand Antarctic Place Names Committee (NZ-APC) in about 1966 in association with Rennick Glacier.

=== Vantage Hills ===
73°33′S 162°27′E. Small, escarpment-like hills located 5 nautical miles (9.3 km; 5.8 mi) west of the south end of Gair Mesa. The hills overlook the saddle of the Campbell Glacier with Rennick Glacier from the south. So named by the northern party of New Zealand Geological Survey Antarctic Expedition (NZGSAE), 1962-63, for their position of "vantage."

=== Illusion Hills ===
73°29′S 162°20′E. Small escarpment-like hills located between the Lichen Hills and Vantage Hills at the head of Rennick Glacier. Named by the northern party of NZGSAE, 1962-63, because they were found to be much more distant than anticipated.

=== Lichen Hills ===
73°18′S 162°00′E. Escarpment-like hills located 2 nautical miles (3.7 km; 2.3 mi) south of Caudal Hills on the west margin of upper Rennick Glacier. Lichens were collected there, hence the name given by the northern party of NZGSAE, 1962-63.

=== Lemasters Bluff ===
73°20′S 162°12′E. A rock bluff at the east extremity of the Lichen Hills. Named by the United States Advisory Committee on Antarctic Names (US-ACAN) for Lieutenant Max E. Lemasters, United States Navy, air operations officer at McMurdo Station, 1967.

=== Section Peak ===
73°14′S 161°55′E. A small, but prominent sandstone knob at the north end of the Lichen Hills. It provided for the geologist one of the few sections seen in sedimentary beds. Mapped and named by the northern party of NZGSAE, 1962-63.

=== Onlooker Nunatak ===
71°54′S 162°22′E. An isolated nunatak which protrudes prominently above the ice of the Rennick Glacier just southeast of Morozumi Range. Named by the northern party of NZGSAE, 1963-64. The name is suggestive of the aspect of the feature.

=== Tenterhooks Crevasses ===
71°40′S 162°30′E. A large system of crevasses in the Rennick Glacier between the Morozumi Range and Lanterman Range. The southern part of these crevasses (near Onlooker Nunatak) was traversed with great difficulty by members of the Northern Party of the NZGSAE, 1963-64, who gave the name.

=== Litell Rocks ===
71°24′S 162°00′E. An area of rock outcrops within the lower Rennick Glacier, located 5 nautical miles (9.3 km; 5.8 mi) east of the north end of Morozumi Range. Named by US-ACAN for Richard J. Litell, public information officer, National Science Foundation, who served in four summer seasons in Antarctica, 1960-64.

=== Renirie Rocks ===
71°20′S 161°20′E. An elliptical rock outcrop 1.5 miles (2.4 km) long at the west side of the terminus of Gressitt Glacier, 10 miles (16 km) northwest of Morozumi Range. Mapped by USGS from surveys and U.S. Navy air photos, 1960–63. Named by US-ACAN for Jack Renirie, USARP Public Information Officer at McMurdo Station in at least five austral summer seasons, 1962-63 through 1970-71.

=== Lonely One Nunatak ===
71°12′S 161°18′E. An eroded rock outcrop 16 nautical miles (30 km; 18 mi) northwest of the Morozumi Range. The low outcrop rises above the relatively featureless ice at the west side of the confluence of the Gressitt and Rennick Glaciers. The name applied by the northern party of NZGSAE, 1963-64, alludes to the relative isolation of the feature.

== Left tributaries ==
Tributaries from the left (west) include, from south to north,

=== Gressit Glacier ===
71°30′S 161°15′E. A broad glacier, about 45 nautical miles (83 km; 52 mi) long, draining the area between Daniels Range and Emlen Peaks in the Usarp Mountains and flowing northeast to enter the Rennick Glacier just north of Morozumi Range. Named by US-ACAN for biologist Judson Linsley Gressitt, Program Director who made biological studies, particularly in the Ross Sea area, in six austral summers, 1959-60 to 1965-66.

=== Lovejoy Glacier ===
70°48′S 160°10′E. A broad glacier descending eastward through the Usarp Mountains between Anderson Pyramid and Sample Nunataks. In its lower course, the glacier runs side by side with the larger Harlin Glacier to the south without a ridge separating the two. Named by US-ACAN for Lieutenant Owen B. Lovejoy of United States Navy Squadron VX-6, pilot of R4D aircraft in Antarctica, 1962-63 and 1963-64.

=== Harlin Glacier ===
70°53′S 160°50′E. A broad sweeping glacier that descends from the polar plateau in the vicinity of Mount Nero on the northwest side of Daniels Range. It flows northeast between Sample Nunataks and the north end of Daniels Range and then eastward to join the lower part of Rennick Glacier. Lovejoy Glacier merges with the north side of this feature east of Sample Nunataks but eventually loses its individual characteristics. Named by US-ACAN for Ben W. Harlin, meteoroloist-in-charge at Little America V, 1957, and Scientific Leader at South Pole Station, 1961.

=== Charybdis Icefalls ===
70°51′S 161°10′E. A large crevassed icefalls in the lower Harlin Glacier, where it descends notably to join Rennick Glacier. The feature is nourished in part by Lovejoy Glacier which flows eastward parallel to the Harlin (north side) and coalesces with it before reaching the icefalls. Mapped by the USGS (1962-63) and NZGSAE (1963-64). Named by NZGSAE after the fearsome whirlpool of Greek mythology.

== Right tributaries ==
Tributaries from the right (east) include, from south to north,

=== Evans Névé ===
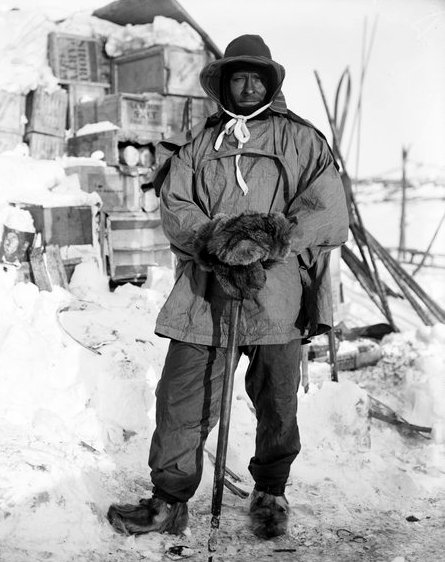
Edgar Evans in 1911

72°45′S 164°30′E. A large névé which nourishes the Tucker Glacier, Mariner Glacier, Aviator Glacier, Rennick Glacier and Lillie Glacier. Named for Edgar Evans of the British Antarctic Expedition, 1910-13, by the Northern Party of NZGSAE, 1963-64. Evans, Wilson, Gates and Bowers accompanied Captain Robert F. Scott to the South Pole, Jan. 17, 1912. All five perished on the return journey.

=== Canham Glacier ===
71°49′S 163°00′E. A tributary glacier about 30 nautical miles (56 km; 35 mi) long which drains the northwest part of Evans Névé. The glacier drains northwest between the Alamein Range and Salamander Range and enters the Rennick Glacier westward of Bowers Peak. Mapped by USGS from surveys and United States Navy air photos, 1960-62. Named by US-ACAN for Lieutenant Commander David W. Canham, Jr., officer in charge of the winter party at the United States Naval Air Facility, McMurdo Sound, 1956.

=== Hunter Glacier ===
71°44′S 163°00′E. A tributary glacier, 7 nautical miles (13 km; 8.1 mi) long, draining westward from central Lanterman Range and entering Rennick Glacier at Mount Lugering. Named by US-ACAN for Lieutenant Commander William G. Hunter, executive and operations officer with the McMurdo Station winter party in 1964.

=== Linder Glacier ===
71°41′S 163°03′E. A steep tributary glacier that drains the south slopes of Mount Bernstein and moves south to enter Hunter Glacier, in the Lanterman Range. Named by US-ACAN for Lieutenant (j.g.) Michael A. Linder, United States Navy Reserve, communications and administrative officer with the McMurdo Station winter party, 1967.

=== Orr Glacier ===
71°36′S 162°52′E. A tributary glacier which drains the large cirque between Mount Moody and Mount Bernstein in the Lanterman Range, and flows west into Rennick Glacier. Named by US-ACAN for Major Thomas L. Orr, USA, Assistant Logistics Officer on the staff of the Commander, United States Naval Support Force, Antarctica, 1968 and 1969.

=== Sledgers Glacier ===
71°26′S 162°48′E. A long tributary glacier in the Bowers Mountains, draining northwest from Husky Pass and along the north flank of Lanterman Range to enter Rennick Glacier between Carnes Crag and Mount Gow. Named by the northern party of NZGSAE, 1963-64, in appreciation of all Antarctic sledging men and the difficult areas they have covered on foot. This glacier was traveled in arduous conditions by the NZGSAE party.

=== Tobogganers Icefall ===
71°31′S 163°30′E. A prominent icefall in the west-flowing tributary to Sledgers Glacier, located at the north side of Molar Massif in the Bowers Mountains. Named by the NZ-APC in 1983 in association with nearby Sledgers Icefall from a proposal by geologist M.G. Laird.

=== MacKinnon Glacier ===
71°32′S 163°13′E. A glacier flowing northward along the west side of Reilly Ridge into Sledgers Glacier. Named in 1983 by the NZ-APC after D.I. MacKinnon, geologist, a member of R.A. Cooper's NZARP geological party in the area, 1974-75.

=== Sledgers Icefall ===
71°28′S 163°12′E. A heavily crevassed icefall midway up the Sledgers Glacier. Its location is just north of the tip of Reilly Ridge. Named by the NZGSAE, 1967-68, in conjunction with Sledgers Glacier and as a locality worth distinguishing in connection with the use of sledges.

=== Carryer Glacier ===
71°17′S 162°38′E. A heavily crevassed tributary glacier, 12 nautical miles (22 km; 14 mi) long, which drains westward from the central part of the Bowers Mountains and enters Rennick Glacier between Mount Soza and Mount Gow. Named by the northern party of NZGSAE, 1963-64, for S.J. Carryer, geologist with this party.

=== Morley Glacier ===
71°12′S 162°45′E. A steep tributary to the Carryer Glacier, flowing south between Hicks Ridge and Mount Tokoroa in the Explorers Range. Named by US-ACAN after Keith T. Morley, Australian IGY observer, Weather Central Meteorologist at Little America V in 1958.

=== Alt Glacier ===
71°06′S 162°31′E. A glacier, 4 nautical miles (7.4 km; 4.6 mi) long, flowing west-southwest from the Explorers Range to enter Rennick Glacier just north of Mount Soza. Named by US-ACAN for Jean Alt, French observer, a weather central meteorologist at Little America V, winter party 1958.

=== Sheehan Glacier ===
70°56′S 162°24′E. A steep and extremely broken glacier draining from the vicinity of Miller Peak in the Explorers Range, and entering the Rennick Glacier just south of Alvarez Glacier. Named by the northern party of NZGSAE, 1963-64, for Maurice Sheehan, mountaineer who wintered at Scott Base, 1963, and was a field party assistant with the expedition.

=== Alvarez Glacier ===
70°53′S 162°20′E. A tributary glacier in the Explorers Range, Bowers Mountains, flowing from the southwest side of Stanwix Peak into Rennick Glacier, to the north of Sheehan Glacier. Named by US-ACAN for Lieutenant Commander José A. Alvarez, Argentine Navy, an IGY Weather Central meteorologist at Little America V in 1957.

=== Arruiz Glacier ===
70°39′S 162°09′E. A tributary glacier in the Explorers Range. It flows west-northwest from Stanwix Peak and enters Rennick Glacier north of Frolov Ridge. Named by US-ACAN for Lieutenant Alberto J. Arruiz, Argentine IGY observer, a Weather Central meteorologist at Little America V in 1958.

== Sources ==
- Alberts, Fred G., ed. (1995), Geographic Names of the Antarctic (PDF) (2 ed.), United States Board on Geographic Names This article incorporates public domain material from websites or documents of the United States Board on Geographic Names.
- Daniels Range, USGS: United States Geological Survey
- Freyberg Mountains, USGS: United States Geological Survey
- Mount Murchison, USGS: United States Geological Survey
- Mount Soza, USGS: United States Geological Survey
- Ob' Bay, USGS: United States Geological Survey
- Pomerantz Tableland, USGS: United States Geological Survey
- Welcome Mountain, USGS: United States Geological Survey

This article incorporates public domain material from websites or documents of the United States Geological Survey.
