= Lanterman Range =

Mountain range in Victoria Land, Antarctica

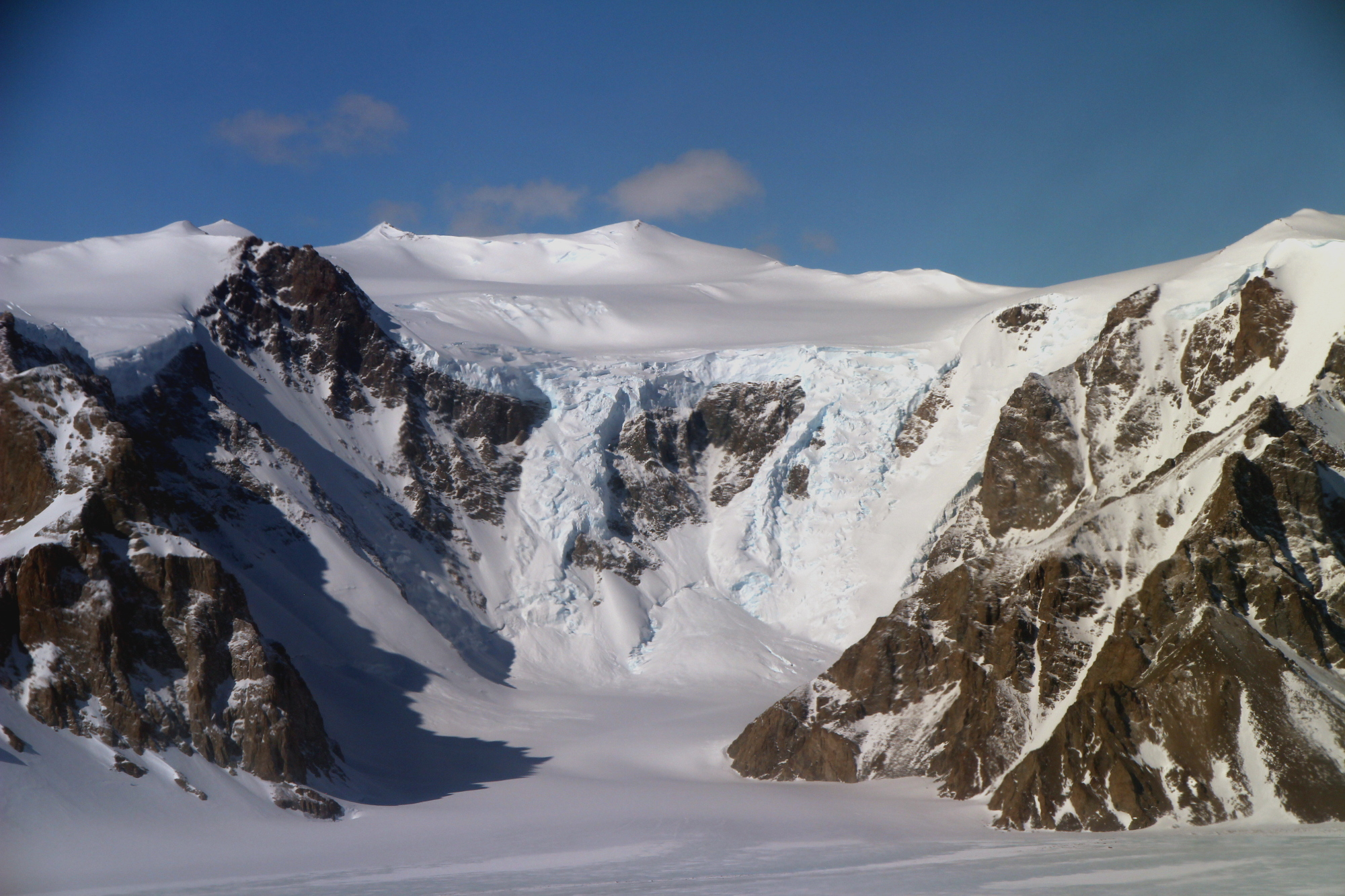
- An icefall in the Lanterman Range

Geography
- Location within Antarctica
- Continent: Antarctica
- Region(s): Victoria Land, Antarctica
- Range coordinates: 71°40′S 163°10′E

The Lanterman Range (71°40′S 163°10′E) is a mountain range about 35 nautical miles (65 km; 40 mi) long and 12 nautical miles (22 km; 14 mi) wide, forming the southwest part of the Bowers Mountains in Antarctica. It is bounded by the Rennick Glacier, Sledgers Glacier, Black Glacier and Canham Glacier.

== Exploration and naming ==
The range was mapped by United States Geological Survey (USGS) from surveys and United States Navy air photos, 1960–62. It was named by the United States Advisory Committee on Antarctic Names (US-ACAN) for Commander William Lanterman, an aerological officer for U.S. Navy Operation Deep Freeze, 1959–62.

== Location ==
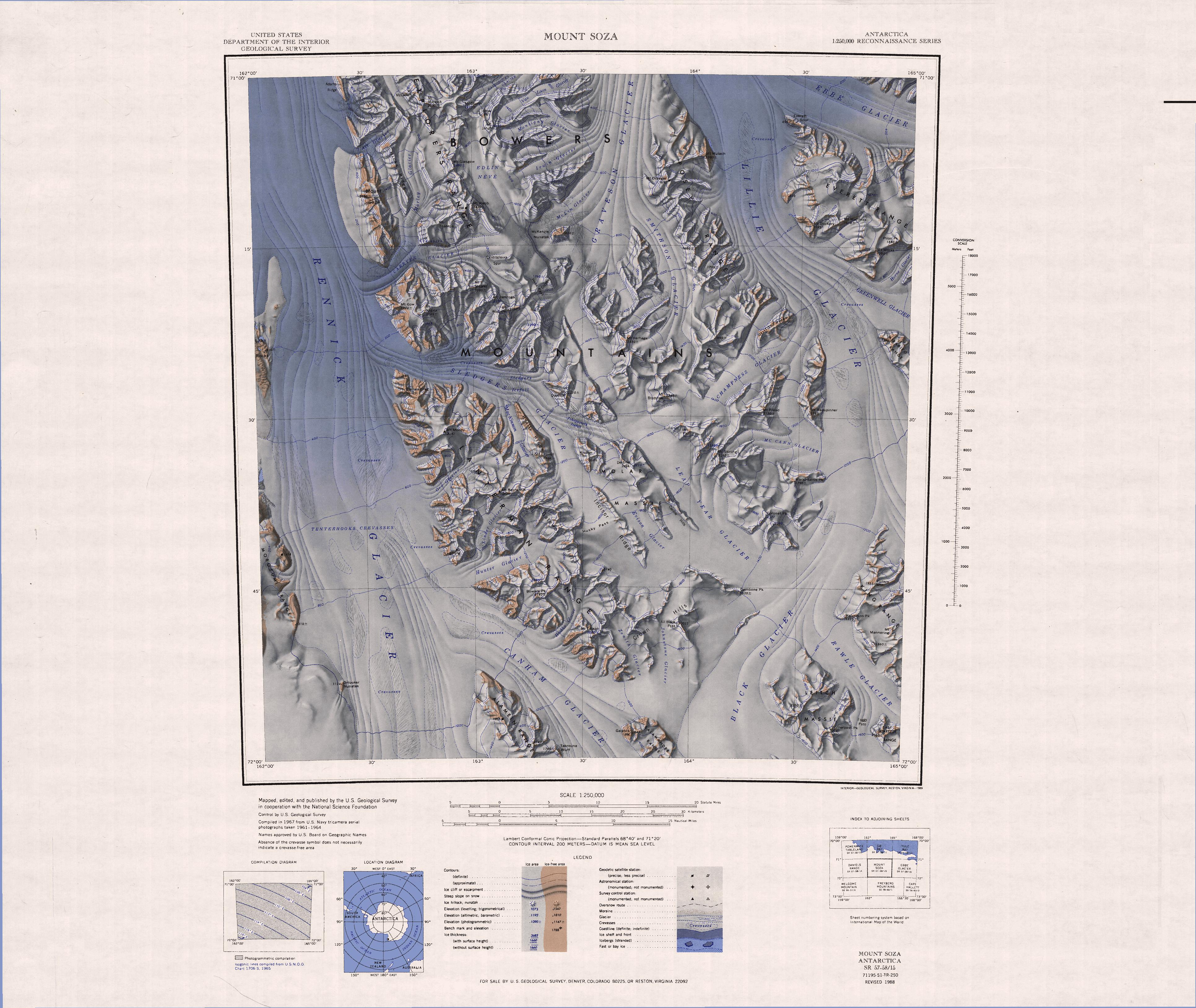
Lanterman Range towards the southwest of map

The Lanterman Range lies to the east of the Rennick Glacier and its tributary Canham Glacier. The Sledgers Glacier flows past its northeast end. The MacKinnon Glacier drains the range to the north into Sledgers Glacier. Glaciers draining to the west include Orr Glacier, Linder Glacier, Hunter Glacier, Hoshko Glacier, Zenith Glacier and Johnstone Glacier. The Molar Massif lies to the east. The Crown Hills form the southeastern end of the range, standing above the Black Glacier to the east.

== Features ==
Features, from north to south, include:

=== Carnes Crag ===
71°28′S 162°41′E. A rock crag, 1,310 metres (4,300 ft) high, in the northwest extremity of Lanterman Range, overlooking the junction of Sledgers Glacier and the Rennick Glacier. Mapped by USGS from surveys and United States Navy air photos, 1960-62. Named by US-ACAN for James J. Carnes United States Navy, chief electrician's mate with the McMurdo Station winter party, 1967.

=== Mount Moody ===
71°31′S 162°52′E. A peak 2,040 metres (6,690 ft) high located 5 nautical miles (9.3 km; 5.8 mi) southeast of Carnes Crag in northwestern Lanterman Range, Bowers Mountains. Named by the northern party of New Zealand Geological Survey Antarctic Expedition (NZGSAE), 1963-64, for Lieutenant Daniel M. Moody, United States Navy, of Squadron VX-6, who flew support flights for this New Zealand expedition.

=== Reilly Ridge ===
71°32′S 163°18′E. Prominent rock ridge about 7 nautical miles (13 km; 8.1 mi) long on the northeast side of Lanterman Range, Bowers Mountains. The ridge descends from the heights just east of Mount Bernstein and forms a part of the southwest wall of Sledgers Glacier. Mapped by USGS from ground surveys and United States Navy air photos, 1960-62. Named by US-ACAN for Commander Joseph L. Reilly, United States Navy, officer in charge of the winter support party at McMurdo Station. 1964.

=== Rowell Peak ===
71°33′S 163°19′E. The highest peak 1,725 metres (5,659 ft) high on Reilly Ridge. Named by the New Zealand Antarctic Place-Names Committee (NZ-APC) in 1983 after A.J. Rowell, geologist, a member of R.A. Cooper's NZARP geological party to the area, 1981-82.

=== Mount Bernstein ===
71°37′S 163°07′E. A prominent mountain, 2,420 metres (7,940 ft) high, which forms a part of the northern wall of Linder Glacier. Mapped by the USGS from surveys and United States Navy air photos, 1960-64. Named by US-ACAN for the late Captain Fred J. Bernstein, Assistant Chief of Staff for Operations and Plans, United States Navy Support Force, Antarctica, 1967 and 1968.

=== Gateway Hills ===
71°40′S 163°28′E. A prominent pair of hills 2,000 metres (6,600 ft) high immediately west of Husky Pass at the head of Sledgers Glacier. So named by the NZ-APC in 1983 on a proposal by geologist M.G. Laird because the hills bound the southern entrance to Sledgers Glacier.

=== Mount Lugering ===
71°42′S 162°57′E. Mountain nearly 2,000 metres (6,600 ft) high on the west side of Lanterman Range. It marks the north side of the terminus of Hunter Glacier where it joins Rennick Glacier. Mapped by USGS from ground surveys and United States Navy air photos, 1960-62. Named by US-ACAN for utilitiesman Donald R. Lugering, United States Navy, of the South Pole Station winter party, 1965.

== Sources ==
- Alberts, Fred G., ed. (1995), Geographic Names of the Antarctic (PDF) (2 ed.), United States Board on Geographic Names This article incorporates public domain material from websites or documents of the United States Board on Geographic Names.
- Mount Soza, USGS: United States Geographic Board, 1967

This article incorporates public domain material from websites or documents of the United States Geological Survey.
